= 1916 in film =

The year 1916 in film involved some significant events.

== Events ==
- Charlie Chaplin signs for Mutual Film for a salary of $10,000 a week and a signing on fee of $150,000, making him one of the highest-paid people in the United States.
- June 24 – Mary Pickford signs a contract for $10,000 a week plus profit participation, guaranteeing her over $1 million per year.
- July 19 – Famous Players–Lasky is formed through a merger of Adolph Zukor's Famous Players Film Company and Jesse L. Lasky's Feature Play Company. Later in the year, they acquire distributor Paramount Pictures.
- August 10 – The official British documentary propaganda film The Battle of the Somme is premièred in London. In the first six weeks of general release (from 20 August) 20 million people view it.
- September 5 – Release of D. W. Griffith's epic film Intolerance: Love's Struggle Through the Ages, starring Lillian Gish (as "The Eternal Motherhood") and Constance Talmadge (in two roles), in the United States. It is estimated to have cost around $2.5 million to make but is initially a commercial failure.
- October 17 – Release of A Daughter of the Gods, the first US production with a million dollar budget, with the first nude scene by a major star (Annette Kellerman).
- November 19 – Samuel Goldfish (later renamed Samuel Goldwyn) and Edgar Selwyn establish Goldwyn Pictures, later to become one of the most successful independent filmmakers.
- The Society of Motion Picture and Television Engineers is founded in the United States as the Society of Motion Picture Engineers.
- 11 mm, an amateur film gauge, appears on the market.

== Top-grossing films (U.S.) ==
The top six 1916 released films by box office gross in North America are as follows:

Highest-grossing films of 1916
Rank	Title	Studio	Gross
1	Intolerance	Triangle	$1,750,000
2	Joan the Woman	Paramount	$605,731
3	Maria Rosa	Paramount	$102,767
4	The Heart of Nora Flynn	Paramount	$87,738
5	The Trail of the Lonesome Pine	Paramount	$77,944
6	The Dream Girl	Paramount	$66,725

== Notable films ==
Films produced in the United States unless stated otherwise

=== # ===
- 20,000 Leagues Under the Sea, directed by Stuart Paton, based on the 1870 novel by Jules Verne

=== A ===
- The Americano, directed by John Emerson, starring Douglas Fairbanks
- The Aryan, directed by and starring William S. Hart, with Bessie Love

=== B ===
- The Battle of the Somme, propaganda film directed by Geoffrey Malins and J. B. McDowell – (GB)
- Behind the Screen, directed by and starring Charlie Chaplin, with Edna Purviance

=== C ===
- Cenere, directed by Febo Mari, starring Eleonora Duse – (Italy)
- Civilization, directed by Reginald Barker, Thomas H. Ince and Raymond B. West, starring Howard C. Hickman and Enid Markey
- The Count, directed by and starring Charlie Chaplin, with Edna Purviance

=== D ===
- A Daughter of the Gods (lost), directed by Herbert Brenon, starring Annette Kellerman

=== E ===
- East Is East, directed by Henry Edwards, starring Florence Turner – (GB)
- East Lynne, directed by Bertram Bracken, starring Theda Bara, based on the 1861 novel by Mrs. Henry Wood
- The End of the World (Verdens Undergang), directed by August Blom, starring Olaf Fønss – (Denmark)
- The Eternal Grind, directed by John B. O'Brien, starring Mary Pickford

=== F ===
- Fatty and Mabel Adrift, directed by and starring Fatty Arbuckle, with Mabel Normand
- Fifty-Fifty, directed by Allan Dwan, starring Norma Talmadge
- The Fireman, directed by and starring Charlie Chaplin, with Edna Purviance
- The Floorwalker, directed by and starring Charlie Chaplin
- The Foundling, directed by John B. O'Brien, starring Mary Pickford

=== G ===
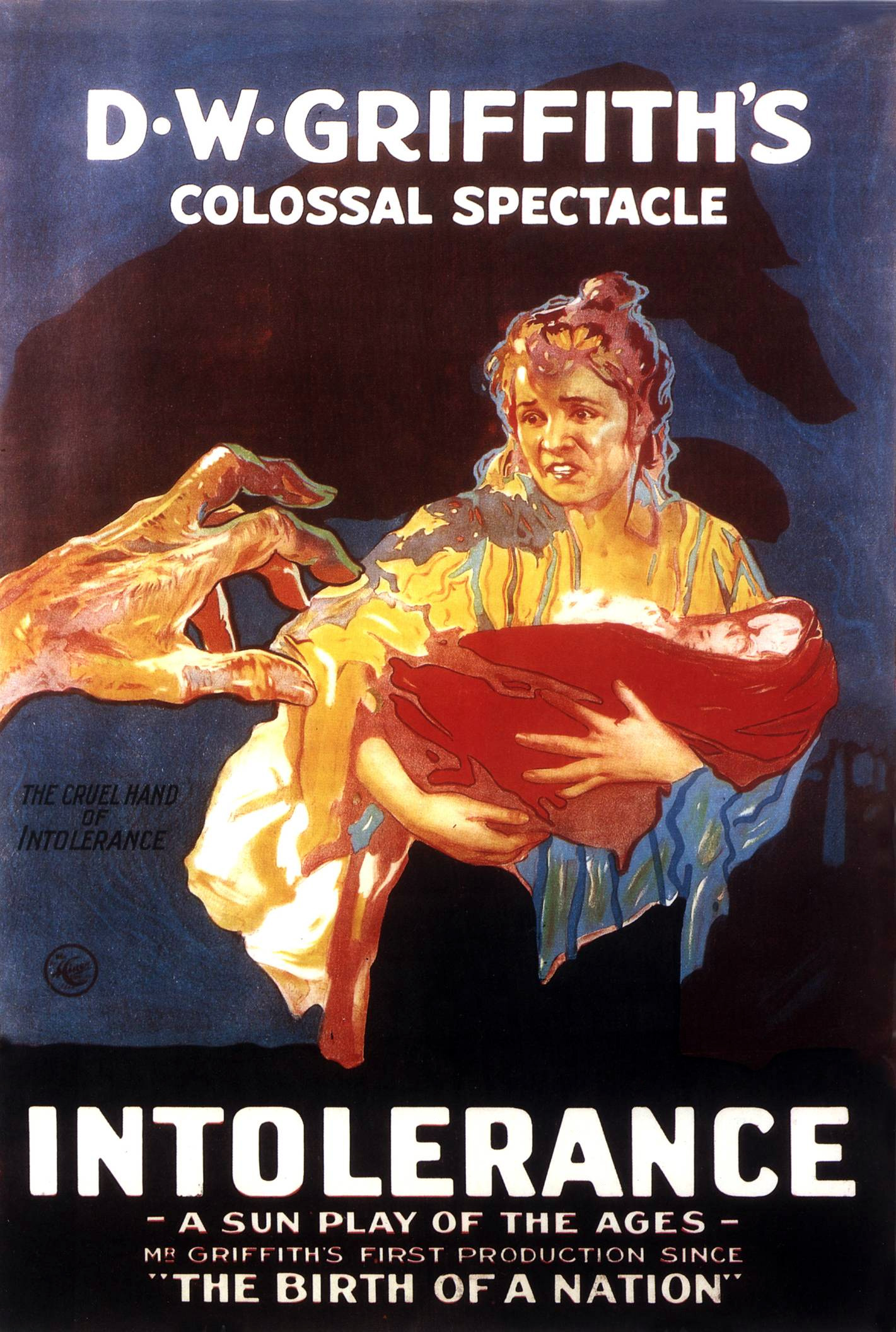
Poster of Intolerancce

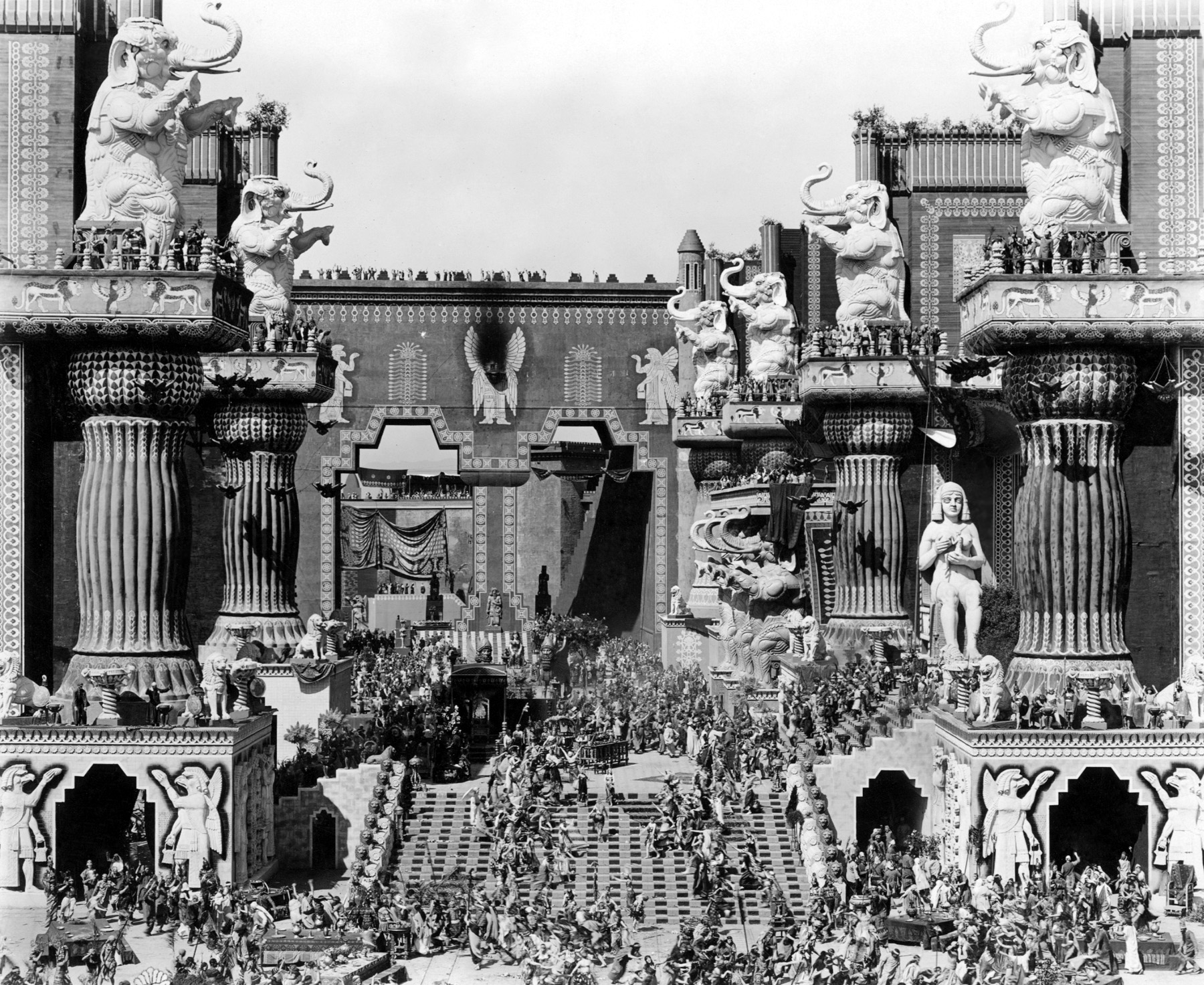
Belshazzar's feast scene from Intolerance

- Going Straight, directed by C. M. Franklin and S. A. Franklin, starring Norma Talmadge
- The Good Bad-Man, directed by Allan Dwan, starring Douglas Fairbanks and Bessie Love

=== H ===
- The Habit of Happiness, directed by Allan Dwan, starring Douglas Fairbanks
- Hell's Hinges, directed by Charles Swickard, starring William S. Hart and Clara Williams
- His Picture in the Papers, directed by John Emerson, starring Douglas Fairbanks
- Homunculus, film serial directed by Otto Rippert, starring Olaf Fønss – (Germany)
- Hoodoo Ann, directed by Lloyd Ingraham, starring Mae Marsh and Robert Harron
- Hulda from Holland, directed by John B. O'Brien, starring Mary Pickford

=== I ===
- Intolerance, directed by D. W. Griffith, starring Lillian Gish, Mae Marsh and Constance Talmadge

=== J ===
- Joan the Woman, directed by Cecil B. DeMille, starring Geraldine Farrar
- Judex, film serial directed by Louis Feuillade, starring René Cresté and Musidora – (France)

=== K ===
- King Lear, directed by Ernest C. Warde, starring Frederick Warde, based on the 17th-century play by William Shakespeare

=== L ===
- Less Than the Dust, directed by John Emerson, starring Mary Pickford

=== M ===
- The Mutiny of the Bounty (lost), directed by Raymond Longford – (New Zealand)
- The Mystery of the Leaping Fish, directed by John Emerson, starring Douglas Fairbanks and Bessie Love

=== O ===
- One A.M., directed by and starring Charlie Chaplin

=== P ===
- The Pawnshop, directed by and starring Charles Chaplin, with Edna Purviance
- Paying the Price, directed by Frank Hall Crane, starring Gail Kane
- Police, directed by and starring Charles Chaplin, with Edna Purviance
- Poor Little Peppina, directed by Sidney Olcott, starring Mary Pickford

=== Q ===
- The Queen of Spades (Pikovaya dama), directed by Yakov Protazanov, starring Ivan Mosjoukine, based on the 1834 novella by Alexander Pushkin – (Russia)

=== R ===
- Reggie Mixes In, directed by Christy Cabanne, starring Douglas Fairbanks and Bessie Love
- The Return of Draw Egan, directed by and starring William S. Hart, with Louise Glaum
- The Rink, directed by and starring Charles Chaplin, with Edna Purviance

=== S ===
- Sherlock Holmes, directed by Arthur Berthelet, starring William Gillette, based on the 1899 play by William Gillette and Arthur Conan Doyle
- Shoes, directed by Lois Weber, starring Mary MacLaren
- Snow White, directed by J. Searle Dawley, starring Marguerite Clark, based on the 1812 fairy tale by the Brothers Grimm

=== V ===
- The Vagabond, directed by and starring Charlie Chaplin, with Edna Purviance

=== W ===
- Where Are My Children?, directed by Phillips Smalley and Lois Weber, starring Tyrone Power Sr.

== Short film series ==
- Broncho Billy Anderson (1910–1916)
- Harold Lloyd (1913–1921)
- Charlie Chaplin (1914–1923)

== Births ==
- January 4 – Robert Parrish, American director editor and former child actor (died 1995)
- January 5 – Alfred Ryder, American actor and director (died 1995)
- February 8 – Betty Field, American film and stage actress (died 1973)
- February 11 – Walter Newman, American radio, writer and screenwriter (died 1993)
- February 13 – James Griffith, American character actor, musician and screenwriter (died 1993)
- February 14
  - Masaki Kobayashi, Japanese film director and screenwriter (died 1996)
  - Edward Platt, American actor (died 1974)
- February 16 – Alberto Sorrentino, Italian film actor (died 1994)
- February 17 – Raf Vallone, Italian actor and footballer (died 2002)
- February 21 – Jan Wiley, American film actress (died 1993)
- February 26 – Jackie Gleason, American comedian, actor, writer, and composer (died 1987)
- February 29 – Dinah Shore, American singer, actress, television personality (died 1994)
- March 6 – Virginia Gregg, American actress (died 1986)
- March 11 – Ferdy Mayne, German-British actor (died 1998)
- March 19 – Eric Christmas, English actor (died 2000)
- March 26 – Sterling Hayden, American actor, author, sailor, and Marine (died 1986)
- April 4 – David White, American actor (died 1990)
- April 5 – Gregory Peck, American actor (died 2003)
- April 6 – Phil Leeds, American character actor (died 1998)
- April 7 – Anthony Caruso, American character actor (died 2003)
- April 10
  - John Alderson, English actor (died 2006)
  - Alfie Bass, English actor (died 1987)
- April 26 – Vic Perrin, American radio, film and television actor (died 1989)
- April 30 – Phil Brown, American actor (died 2006)
- May 1 – Glenn Ford, Canadian-American actor (died 2006)
- May 6 – Adriana Caselotti, American actress and singer (died 1997)
- May 24 – Peter Whitney, American actor (died 1972)
- May 27 – Willie Best, American television and film actor (died 1962)
- May 29 – Sidney Glazier, American film producer (died 2002)
- June 6 – Dorothea Kent, American film actress (died 1990)
- June 12 – Irwin Allen, American film and television producer and director (died 1991)
- June 14 – Dorothy McGuire, American actress (died 2001)
- June 19 – Karin Booth, American film and television actress (died 2003)
- June 23 – Irene Worth, American stage and screen actress (died 2002)
- June 29 – Ruth Warrick, American singer, actress and political activist (died 2005)
- July 1 – Olivia de Havilland, British-American actress (died 2020)
- July 2 – Ken Curtis, American actor and singer (died 1991)
- July 23 – Sandra Gould, American actress (died 1999)
- July 27 – Keenan Wynn, American character actor (died 1986)
- July 31 – Sydney Tafler, English actor (died 1979)
- August 3 – Hertha Feiler, Austrian actress (died 1970)
- August 18 – Don Keefer, American actor (died 2014)
- August 21 – Geoffrey Keen, English actor (died 2005)
- August 24 – Hal Smith, American actor (died 1994)
- August 25 – Van Johnson, American actor and dancer (died 2008)
- August 27
  - George Montgomery, American actor (died 2000)
  - Martha Raye, American comic actress and singer (died 1994)
- September 12 – Edward Binns, American actor (died 1990)
- September 15 – Margaret Lockwood, British actress (died 1990)
- September 18 – Rossano Brazzi, Italian actor, director and screenwriter (died 1994)
- September 28 – Peter Finch, English-Australian actor (died 1977)
- October 4 – George Sidney, American film director and producer (died 2002)
- October 10 – Benson Fong, American character actor (died 1987)
- October 20 – Anton Diffring, German actor (died 1989)
- November 5 – Willoughby Gray, English actor (died 1993)
- November 12 – Liam Dunn, American character actor (died 1976)
- November 16 – Daws Butler, American voice actor (died 1988)
- November 17 – Frank Maxwell, American actor (died 2004)
- November 20 – Evelyn Keyes, American film actress (died 2008)
- November 23 – Michael Gough, British actor (died 2011)
- November 29 – Fran Ryan, American character actress (died 2000)
- December 5 – Margaret Hayes, American film, stage, and television actress (died 1977)
- December 8 – Richard Fleischer, American film director (died 2006)
- December 9 – Kirk Douglas, American actor and filmmaker (died 2020)
- December 13 – Mark Stevens, American actor (died 1994)
- December 18 – Betty Grable, American actress, pin-up girl, dancer, model, and singer (died 1973)

== Deaths ==
- January 17, Arthur V. Johnson, 39, American screen actor and director, The Sealed Room, The Unchanging Sea, The Adventures of Dollie, The Voice of the Violin, tuberculosis
- June 22
  - Page Peters, 26, American screen actor, The Warrens of Virginia, The Purple Scar, An International Marriage, Davy Crockett, Pasquale, drowned swimming
  - Maurice Vinot, 27, French screen actor, airplane crash
- September 9 – Sydney Ayres, 37, American stage & screen actor and director, The Sting of Conscience, The Avenger, As in a Dream, multiple sclerosis
- September 17 – Arthur Hoops, 45, American stage & screen actor, The Secret of Eve, Bridges Burned, Extravagance, The Eternal Question, The Scarlet Woman, heart attack
- September 27 – Camille D'Arcy, 37, American actress, The Prince Chap, Captain Jinks of the Horse Marines, A Daughter of the City, The White Sister, The Pacifist, infection from bathing
- October 6 – Henry Woodruff, 47, American stage & screen actor, A Beckoning Flame, A Man and His Mate, Bright's disease
- November 30 – Dorrit Weixler, 23, German comic actress, Maria, Kammermusik, Heimgekehrt, Todesrauchen, suicide by hanging
- unknown – Jean, the Vitagraph Dog (born 1902), American Border Collie, Jean and the Calico Doll, Fraid Cat

== Debuts ==
- Warner Anderson – The Sunbeam
- Edward Arnold – The Misleading Lady
- Richard Barthelmess – Gloria's Romance
- Lina Basquette – The Dumb Girl of Portici
- Constance Bennett – The Valley of Decision
- Joan Bennett – The Valley of Decision
- Betty Blythe – Slander
- Billie Burke – Peggy
- Helene Chadwick – The Challenge
- Mady Christians – Audrey
- Ruth Clifford – Behind the Lines
- William Collier Jr. – The Bugle Call
- Ann Dvorak – Ramona
- Barbara Everest – The Hypocrites
- Elinor Fair – The End of the Trail
- Douglas Fairbanks Jr. – American Aristocracy
- John Halliday – The Devil's Toy
- Virginia Hammond – Vultures of Society
- Grayce Hampton – The Pursuing Vengeance
- Dary Holm – Des Nächsten Weib
- Hedda Hopper – The Battle of Hearts
- Wanda Jarszewska – Tyrannical Overlords – From Poland's Dark Time
- Mary Jerrold – Disraeli
- Clarence Kolb – A Million for Mary
- Kate Lester – Molly Make-Believe
- Cläre Lotto – Leichtsinn und Pflicht
- Mary MacLaren – Where Are My Children?
- Dorcas Matthews – The Captive God
- Grant Mitchell – The Misleading Lady
- Colleen Moore – The Prince of Graustark
- Frank Morgan – The Suspect
- Mae Murray – To Have and to Hold
- Ramon Novarro – Joan the Woman
- Reginald Owen – A Place in the Sun
- Tina Pica – Carmela, la sartina di Montesanto
- Marie Prevost – Unto Those Who Sin
- Cyril Raymond – The Hypocrites
- Edward G. Robinson – Arms and the Woman
- Eve Southern – Intolerance
- Lewis Stone – Honor's Altar
- Eddie Sturgis – The Lost Bridegroom
- Hermann Thimig – The Countess Heyers
- Edward Van Sloan – Slander
- Elsa Wagner – The Wandering Light
- Lucile Watson – The Girl with the Green Eyes
