= What Happened to Jones =

What Happened to Jones may refer to:

- What Happened to Jones (play), an 1897 play by George Broadhurst
- What Happened to Jones (1915 film), a lost silent film
- What Happened to Jones (1920 film), a lost silent film
- What Happened to Jones (1926 film), a silent film comedy
