= Law of the Land =

Law of the Land may refer to:

- Law of the land, a legal term referring to all the laws in force within a country or region
- Law of the Land (album), a 1973 album by the Undisputed Truth
  - "Law of the Land" (song), the title song
- Law of the Land (TV series), a 1993–1999 Australian drama series
- The Law of the Land, a 1914 play by George Broadhurst
- The Law of the Land (film), a 1917 silent film based on the play
