= The Soul Market =

1916 film

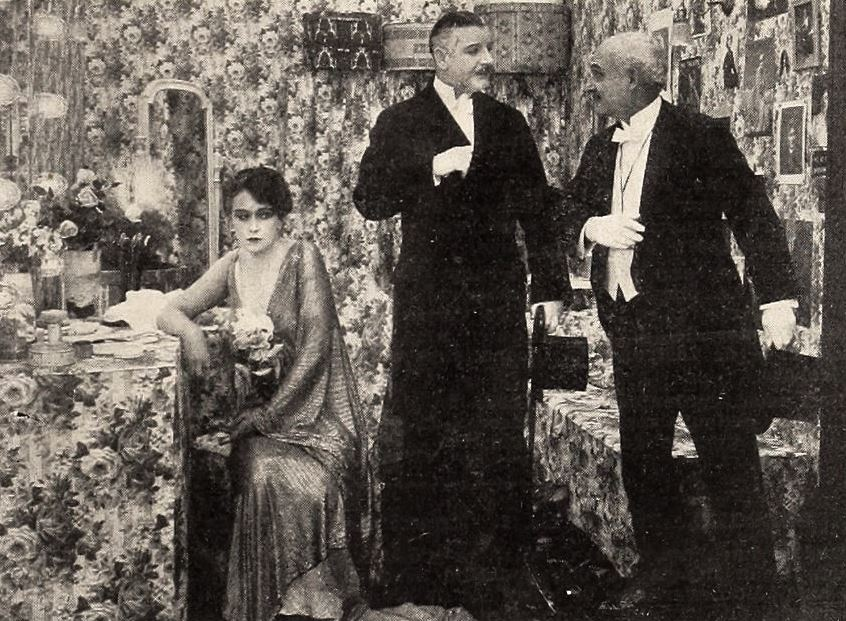
- Film still
- Directed by: Francis J. Grandon
- Written by: Aaron Hoffman
- Starring: Olga Petrova
- Cinematography: George Peters
- Production companies: Popular Plays and Players Inc
- Distributed by: Metro Pictures
- Release date: March 12, 1916
- Running time: 50 minutes
- Country: United States
- Language: Silent (English intertitles)

The Soul Market is a 1916 American silent drama film directed by Francis J. Grandon. The film is considered to be lost.

== Plot ==
Olga Petrova plays Elaine Elton, a famous actress who is engaged to a powerful producer. She meets a millionaire, who poses as a chauffeur to conquer her because he knows she dislikes rich men. She falls in love with him but cannot accept his proposal of marriage because of her engagement to the producer.

== Cast ==
- Olga Petrova as Elaine Elton (credited as Olya Petrova)
- Arthur Hoops as Oscar Billings
- John Merkyl as Jack Dexter (credited as Wilmuth Merkyl)
- Fritz De Lint as Dick Gordon
- Evelyn Brent as Vivian Austin
- Fraunie Fraunholz as Griggs
- Charles Brandt as Sam Franklin
- Charles Mack as Harvey Theugh
- Bert Tuey as Joe Burrows
- Grace Florence as Mrs. Wilson
- Cora Milholland as Susan
- Al Thomas as James Austin
- Gypsy O'Brien as Billie Simpson
- Claire Lillian Barry
