= Lillian Bradley =

Lillian Bradley may refer to:

- Lillian K. Bradley (1921–1995), American mathematician and mathematics educator
- Lillian Trimble Bradley (1875–1959), American theatrical director and playwright
