= The Lure of Heart's Desire =

1916 film by Francis J. Grandon

- Directed by: Francis J. Grandon
- Written by: Robert W. Service; Aaron Hoffman
- Starring: Edmund Breese
- Distributed by: Metro Pictures
- Release date: January 17, 1916
- Running time: Five reels
- Country: United States
- Language: Silent

The Lure of Heart's Desire is a 1916 silent American drama film directed by Francis J. Grandon. The film is considered to be lost.

== Cast ==
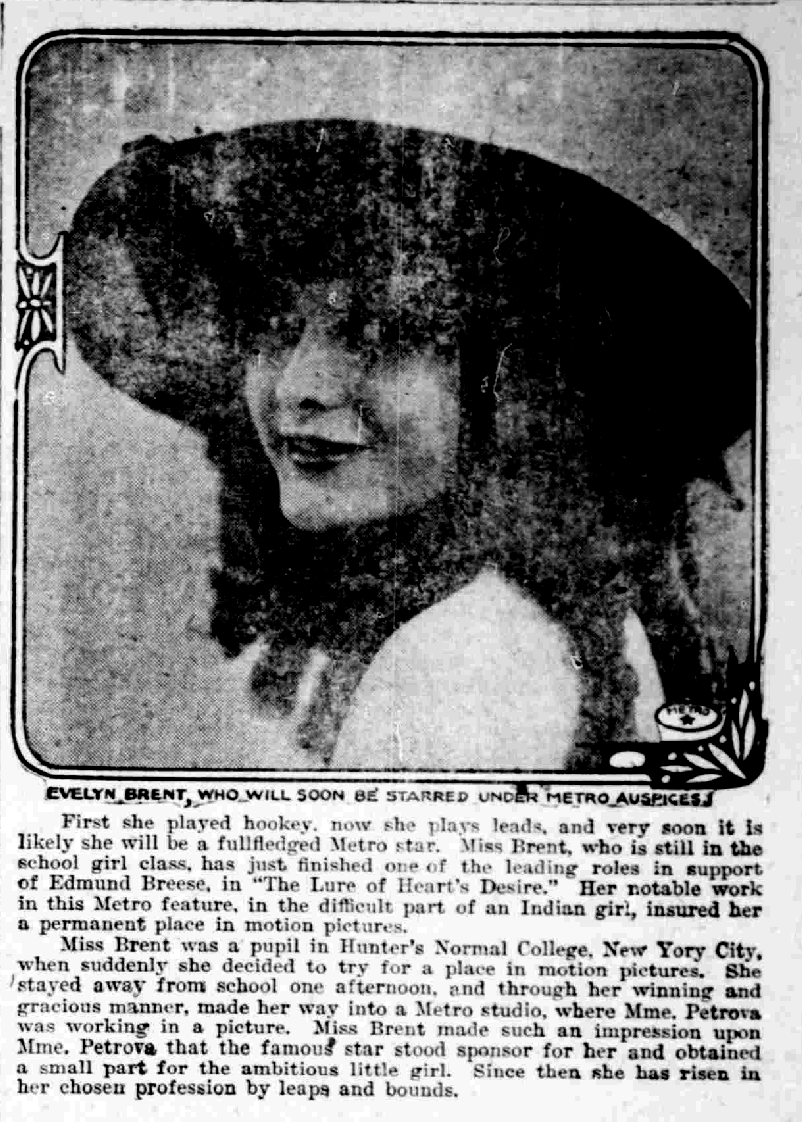
Evelyn Brent interview for the film

- Edmund Breese as Jim Carew
- Arthur Hoops as Thomas Martin
- John Mahon as Crazy Jake
- Jeanette Horton as Ethel Wynndham
- Evelyn Brent as Little Snowbird
