= My Madonna =

1915 film by Alice Guy-Blaché

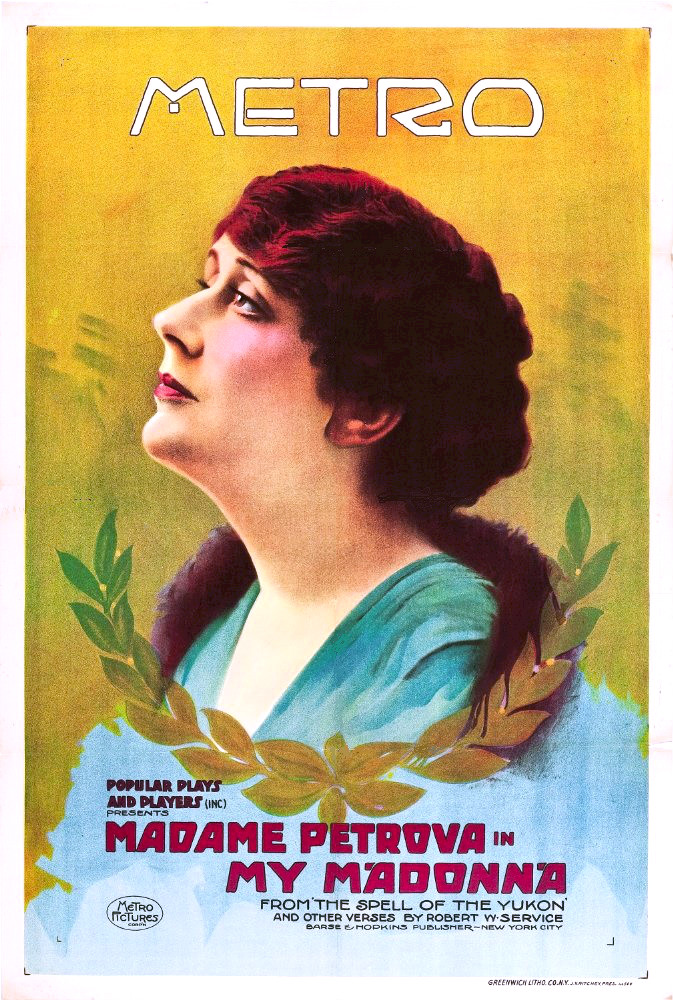
- Film poster
- Directed by: Alice Guy
- Written by: Alice Guy; Aaron Hoffman
- Based on: The Spell of the Yukon and Other Verses by Robert W. Service
- Produced by: Herbert Blaché; Alice Guy
- Starring: Olga Petrova
- Cinematography: John W. Boyle
- Distributed by: Metro Pictures
- Release date: October 25, 1915
- Country: United States
- Language: Silent (English intertitles)

My Madonna is a lost 1915 American silent drama film directed by Alice Guy and starring Olga Petrova.

== Cast ==
- Olga Petrova - Lucille (as Madame Petrova)
- Guy Coombs - Robert
- Evelyn Dumo - The Baroness
- Albert Howson - The Baron
- James O'Neill - The Art Merchant
- Albert Derbil
- Yahne Fleury -
