= Extravagance (1916 film) =

1916 film by Burton L. King

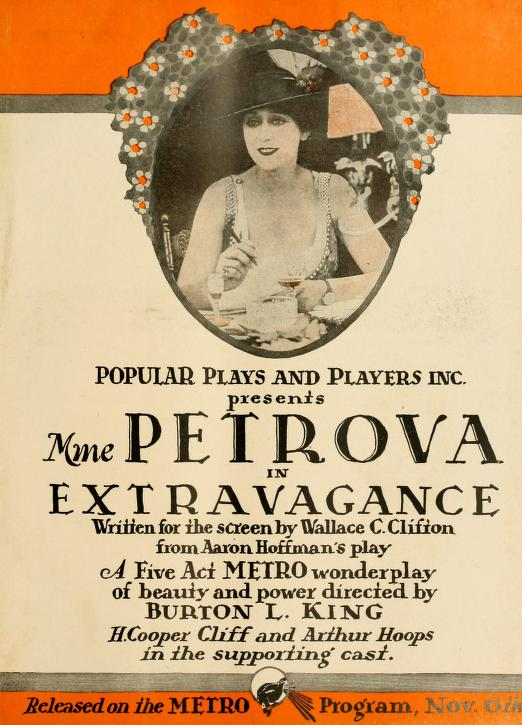
- lobby poster
- Directed by: Burton L. King
- Written by: Wallace C. Clifton(scenario)
- Based on: story or play by Aaron Hoffman
- Starring: Madame Olga Petrova
- Cinematography: Andre Barlatier
- Production companies: Popular Plays and Players
- Distributed by: Metro Pictures
- Release date: November 6, 1916
- Running time: 5 reels
- Country: USA
- Language: Silent...English intertitles

Extravagance is a 1916 silent film comedy drama directed by Burton L. King and based on a play by Aaron Hoffman. It stars Olga Petrova sometimes billed as Madame Olga Petrova. Produced by Popular Plays and Players, it was distributed through Metro Pictures.

== Cast ==
- Madame Olga Petrova as Norma Russell
- H. Cooper Cliffe as Courtland Russell
- Mahlon Hamilton as Franklin Hall
- Arthur Hoops as Howard Dundore
- J. W. Hartman as Horace Short
- Edward Martindel as Robert Mackay
- Tom Cameron as Butler

== Preservation status ==
A print survives at Cinémathèque Québécoise, Montreal.
