= List of Italian films of 1916 =

A list of films produced in Italy in 1916 (see 1916 in film):

Title	Director	Cast	Genre	Notes
1916
...e i rettili furono vinti!				
...E l'altare crollò				
A guardia di Sua Maestà				
Addio amore!				
The Blind Woman of Sorrento	Gustavo Serena	Gustavo Serena, Alfredo De Antoni	Drama	
Cenere	Febo Mari	Eleonora Duse, Febo Mari	Drama	
The Courier of Moncenisio	Leopoldo Carlucci	Achille Majeroni, Lina Millefleurs	Historical	
La falena	Carmine Gallone	Lyda Borelli	Drama	
Jacobo Ortis	Giuseppe Sterni	Paola Borboni		
