= Florence Moore =

American actress

Florence E. Moore
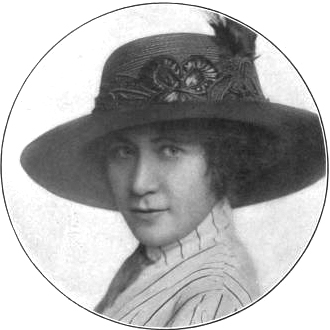
- Born: November 13, 1886; Philadelphia, Pennsylvania, United States
- Died: March 23, 1935 (aged 48); Darby, Pennsylvania, United States
- Occupation: Actress
- Spouses: William J. Montgomery; John O. Kerner; Jules I. Schwob
- Relatives: Frank Moore (brother)

Florence E. Moore (November 13, 1886 – March 23, 1935) was an American vaudeville and Broadway performer, and an actress in silent films.

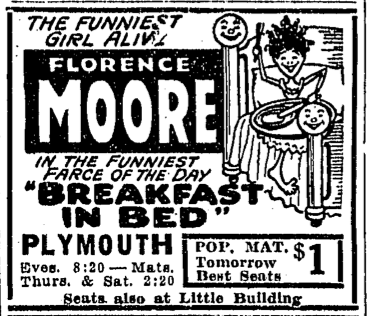
Advertisement for Moore's appearance at Plymouth Theatre (Boston), 1919

== Biography ==
Born in Philadelphia, Pennsylvania, Moore began singing in the choir of Saint Clement's Church, Philadelphia at the age of thirteen. She began touring with the stock company of her brother, Frank. Florence got her first opportunity in Moscow, Idaho, when a male member of the cast failed to appear. Thereafter she was a regular with the company, playing the role of a Chinese without pay.

Her first Broadway appearance came in 1912, as Clorinda Scribblem in Hanky Panky. During the next twenty years she participated in numerous productions. As a comedian she performed in musical comedies, revues on Broadway, and headlined as a vaudeville actress while touring America. While working in The Champagne Girls, Florence met and married William J. Montgomery and they became part of a popular vaudeville team. She divorced Montgomery and married John O. Kerner. Later she was separated from Kerner. Records show that she was also married to Jules I. Schwob.

To theatregoers in New York, New York Florence is perhaps best known for being the first female emcee at the Palace Theatre. as well as her performance in Parlor, Bedroom and Bath. The production debuted in New York and played for two years on the road. Her final appearance on the New York stage came in 1932, in a revival of Cradle Snatchers. She starred in the role of Mary Boland which had been created seven years earlier.

As a motion picture actress Moore had a brief career. Films in which she appeared are The Old Melody (1913) opposite King Baggot, The Weakness of Strength (1916), and The Secret of Eve (1917) opposite Olga Petrova. She belonged to the Actors' Equity Association and the Twelfth Night Club.

Florence Moore died in the Fitzgerald Mercy Hospital in Darby, Pennsylvania in 1935, aged forty eight. Death followed an operation for cancer.

== Filmography ==
Year	Title	Role	Notes
1913	The Old Melody	Dora	Short
1916	The Weakness of Strength	Little Bessie	
1917	The Secret of Eve	Rosa	
1924	Broadway After Dark	Herself, Cameo Appearance	
