= Playing with Fire (1916 film) =

1916 film

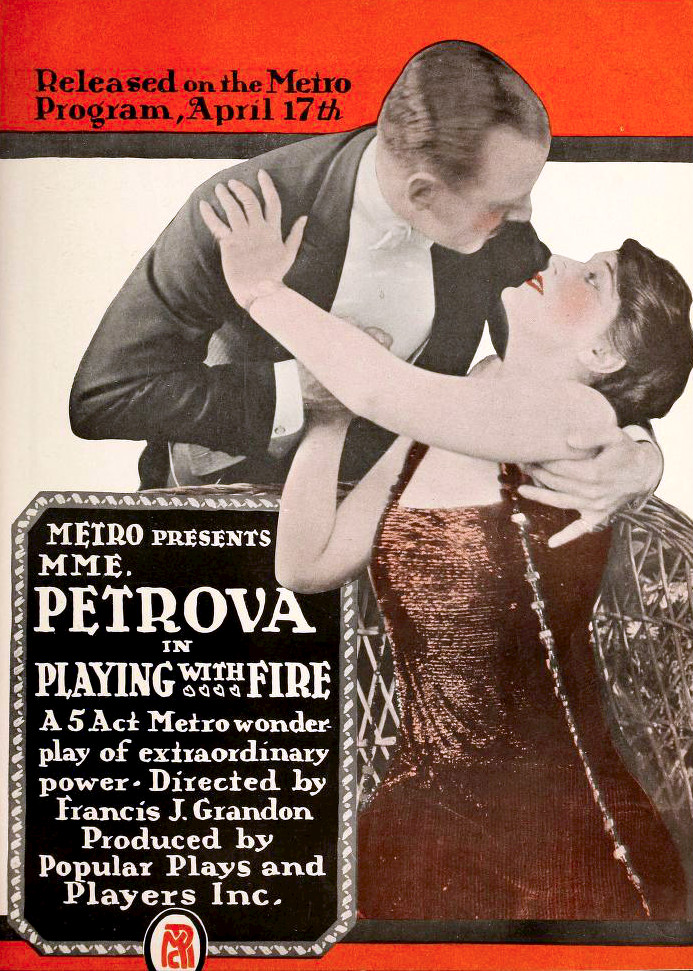
- Advert for film
- Directed by: Francis J. Grandon
- Written by: Aaron Hoffman
- Starring: Olga Petrova
- Cinematography: Robert Smith
- Production companies: Popular Plays and Players
- Distributed by: Metro Pictures
- Release date: April 17, 1916
- Running time: Five reels
- Country: United States
- Language: Silent (English intertitles)

Playing with Fire is a 1916 American silent drama film directed by Francis J. Grandon, starring Olga Petrova, and released by Metro Pictures. It is now considered to be a lost film.

== Cast ==
- Olga Petrova as Jean Serian (as Mme. Petrova)
- Arthur Hoops as Geoffrey Vane
- Evelyn Brent as Lucille Vane
- Pierre LeMay as Philip Derblay
- Catherine Doucet as Rosa Derblay (credited as Catherine Calhoun)
- Philip Hahn as Jacques Gobert
