= What Happened to Jones (1915 film) =

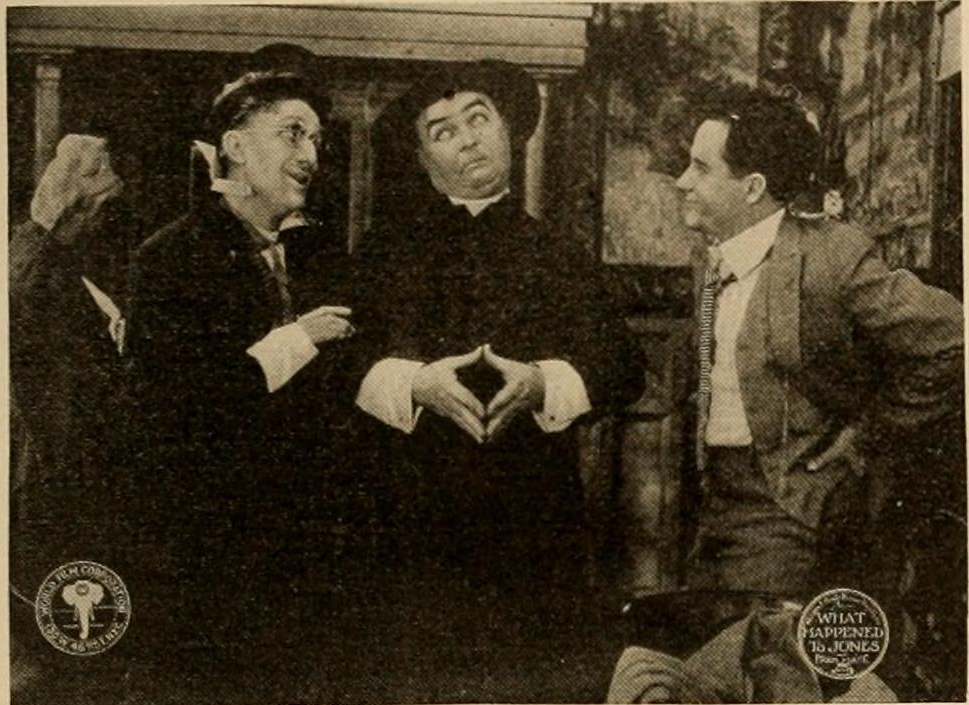
- Scene from film
- Directed by: Fred Mace
- Based on: a play, What Happened to Jones, by George Broadhurst (1897)
- Produced by: William A. Brady
- Starring: Fred Mace
- Distributed by: World Film
- Release date: March 22, 1915
- Running time: 5 reels
- Country: USA
- Language: Silent..English

What Happened to Jones is a lost 1915 silent film directed by and starring Fred Mace. It is based on George Broadhurst's 1897 play What Happened to Jones. William A. Brady was the producer.

The film's exterior scenes were filmed in the Jacksonville, Florida area.

== Cast ==
- Bradley Barker - Col. Filbert
- Chester Barnett - Richard Heatherly
- Marjorie Blossom - Minerve
- Mary Charleson - Marjorie
- Joseph Daly - Bishop of Timbuctoo (*as Joe Daly)
- Fred Mace - Jones
- William Mandeville - Professor Ebeneezer Goodly
- Leonora Organ - Cissy (*as Leonia Morgan)
- Caroline Rankin - Alvina Starlight (*as Carolyn Rankin
- Josie Sadler - Helma
