= The Eternal Question =

1916 film by Burton L. King

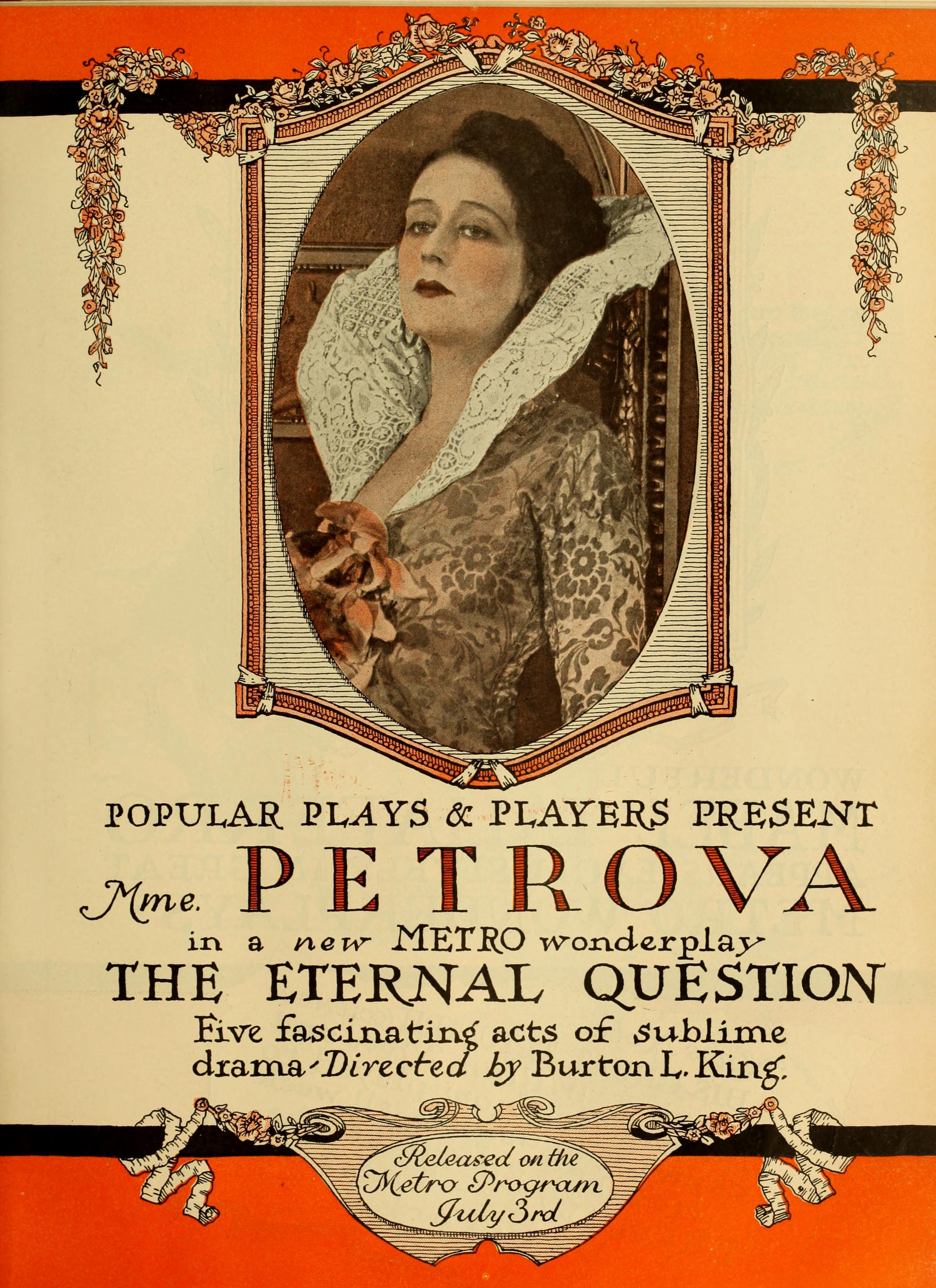
- Directed by: Burton L. King
- Written by: Wallace O. Clifton (scenario); Aaron Hoffman (story)
- Starring: Olga Petrova
- Cinematography: Joseph Seiden
- Production companies: Popular Plays and Players
- Distributed by: Metro Pictures
- Release date: July 3, 1916
- Running time: 5 reels
- Country: United States
- Language: Silent (English intertitles)

The Eternal Question is a lost 1916 American silent drama film starring Olga Petrova and directed by Burton L. King. It was produced by the production company known as Popular Plays and Players and released through the newly formed Metro Pictures.

== Cast ==
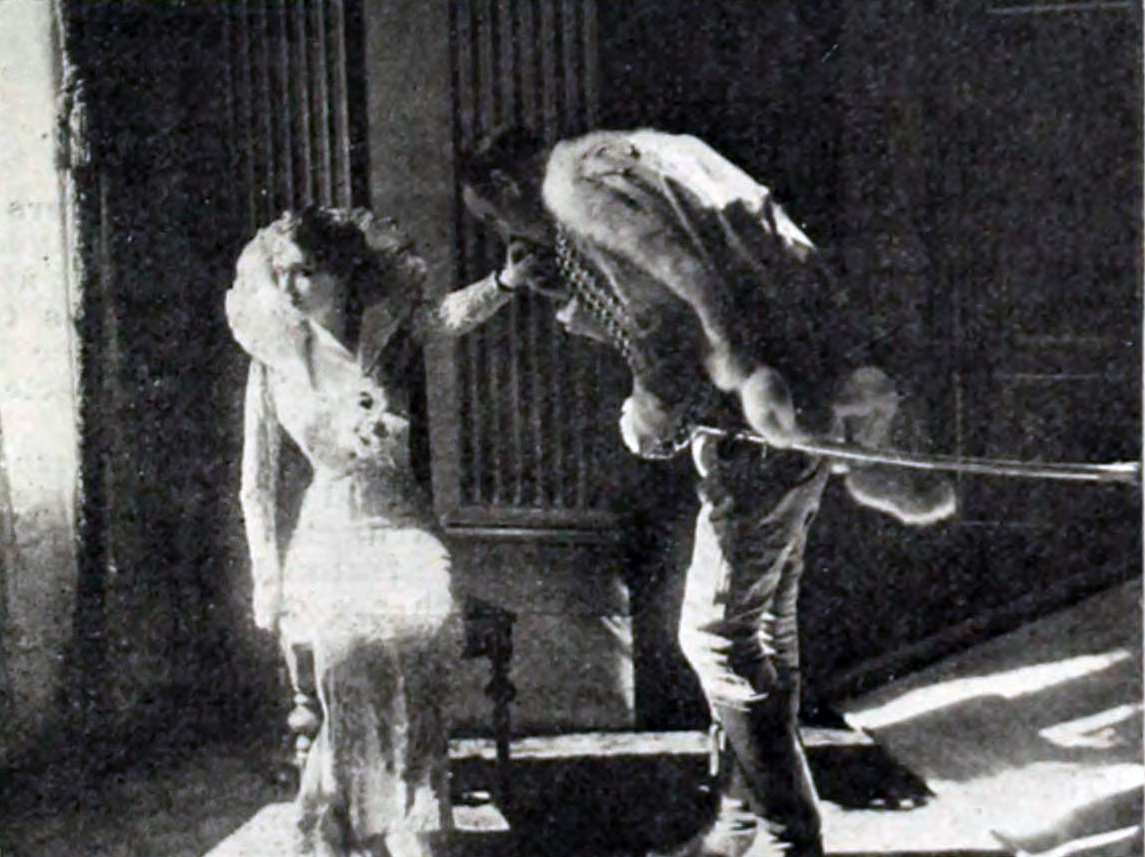
Olga Petrova (left) in a film still.

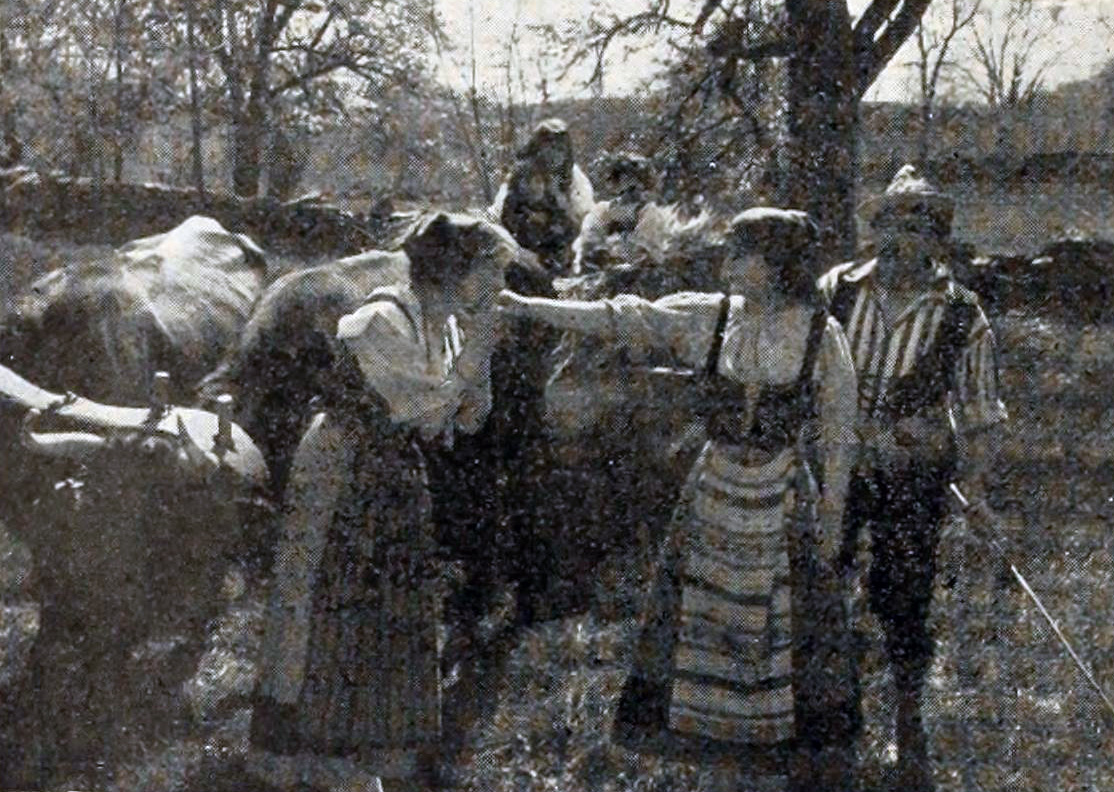
Another still of the film.

- Olga Petrova - Bianca
- Mahlon Hamilton - Ralph Courtland
- Arthur Hoops - Grand Duke of Serdian
- Warner Oland - Pierre Felix
- Edward Martindel - Allen Tait
- Henry Leone - Carlo
- Howard Messimer - King of Montenaro
- Evelyn Dumo - Carlotta

== Production ==
An exterior scene for The Eternal Question was taken outside of the National Democratic Club, at the intersection of 50th Street and 5th Ave.
