= The Scarlet Woman =

1916 film by Edmund Lawrence

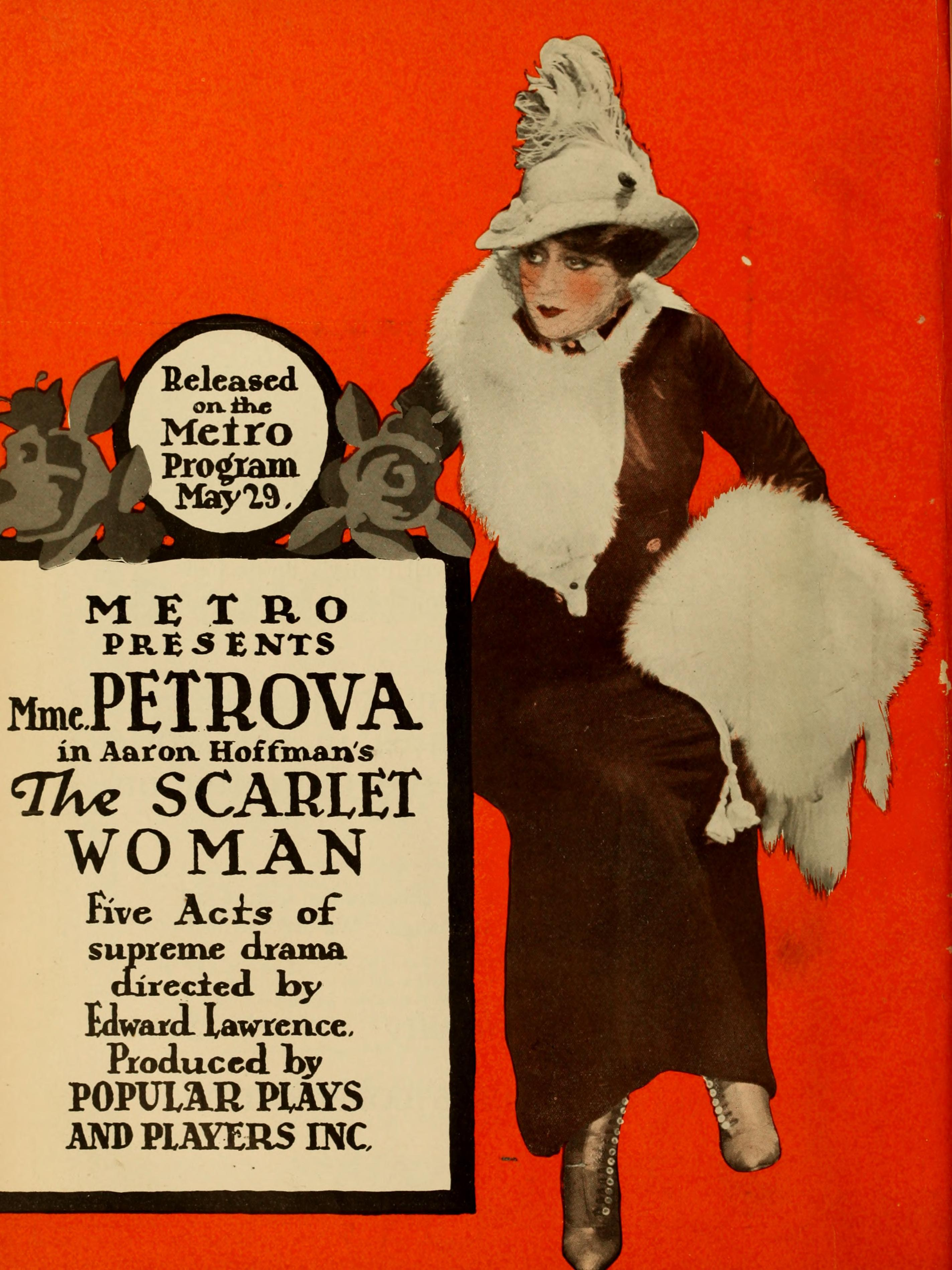
- Lobby poster
- Directed by: Edmund Lawrence
- Written by: Aaron Hoffman
- Starring: Olga Petrova
- Cinematography: Robert C. Smith
- Production companies: Popular Plays and Players
- Distributed by: Metro Pictures
- Release date: May 29, 1916
- Running time: 5 reels
- Country: United States
- Language: Silent (English intertitles)

The Scarlet Woman is a 1916 American silent melodrama film directed by Edmund Lawrence and starring Madame Olga Petrova. It was distributed by Metro Pictures, then a newly formed organization.

== Cast ==
- Olga Petrova as Thora Davis
- Edward Martindel as Hanlin Davis
- Arthur Hoops as Clinton Hastings
- Eugene O'Brien as Robert Blake
- Frances Gordon as Paula Gordon
- Frank Hanna

== Preservation ==
With no prints of The Scarlet Woman located in any film archives, it is a lost film.
