= The Law of the Land =

The Law of the Land is a play in four acts by George Broadhurst. It premiered on Broadway at the 48th Street Theatre on September 30, 1914 with Broadhurst also serving as the producer and director of the production. Successful, it ran there for 221 performances before closing in April 1915. The cast was led by Julia Dean as Margaret Harding, Charles Lane as Robert Harding, Milton Sills as Geoffrey Morton, and George Fawcett as Inspector Cochrane. Others in the cast included George Graham as Arthur Brockland, Harry Lillford as Chetwood, James Seeley as Doctor Whittridge, Walter Craven as Police Captain Prichard, Harry Oldridge as Policeman Taylor, Thomas Gunn as Policeman Burns, Ethel Wright as Hurlburt, and Master Macomber as Bennie.

== Plot ==
The play tells the story of Margaret, a woman whose poor financial circumstances force her to marry Robert Harding in order to save her family from ruin. Harding is physically and verbally abusive towards her. She endures, but finds escape through an extramarital affair with the young man Geoffrey who is kind to her. Margaret becomes pregnant, but it is Geoffrey who is the father and not Robert. Initially, Robert believes Bennie is his son but five years after his birth he learns the truth. Robert attacks Bennie with a whip and Margaret intervenes to protect her son, killing her husband with a revolver.

The Harding household rallies around Margaret to conceal the crime, with Chetwood the Butler and Arthur Brockland, Robert Harding's secretary, devising a scheme to make the death look like a suicide. Inspector Cochrane, Doctor Whittridge, and three policemen investigate the death and uncover truth that Margaret killed her husband and the suicide was faked. She is initially charged with murder with Geoffrey also accused as her accomplice. Ultimately Margaret is successful in convincing the police that she killed her husband in an act of self defense and the charges are dropped.

== Film adaption ==
The play was adapted into a 1917 silent film starring Olga Petrova as Margaret.
