= Max Dill =

American vaudeville comedian (1876–1949)

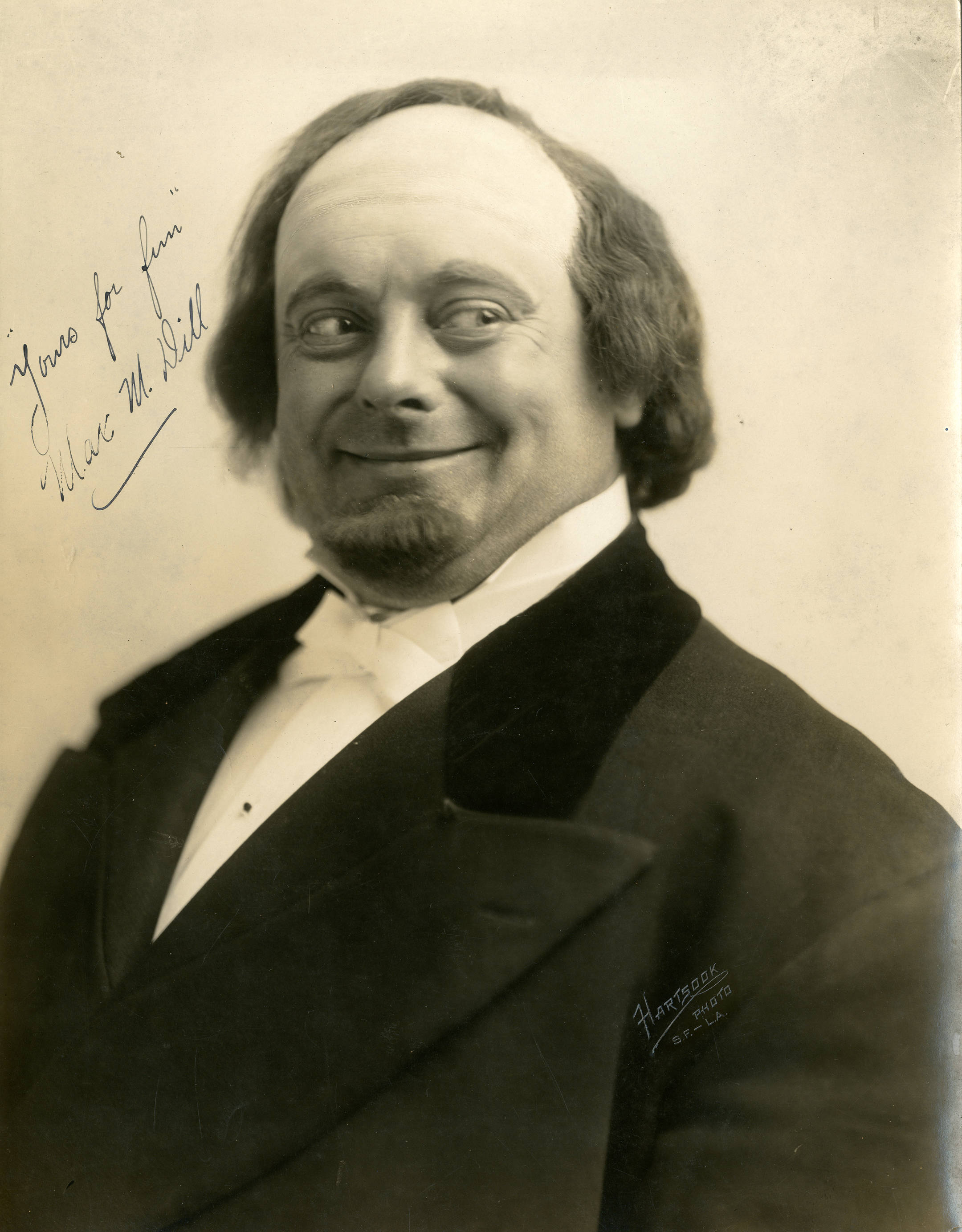
- Dill in 1917
- Born: Max M. Dill; September 15, 1876; Cleveland, Ohio, U.S.
- Died: November 21, 1949 (aged 73); San Francisco, California, U.S.
- Resting place: Forest Lawn Memorial Park Cemetery, Glendale, California, U.S.
- Years active: 1916–1927

Max M. Dill (September 15, 1876 – November 21, 1949) was an American vaudeville comedian who starred briefly in film between 1916 and 1917.

Dill was part of the vaudeville team Kolb and Dill, partnering with Clarence Kolb. Dill's short career in film began when he was 39 years old. Kolb co-starred in some of his films. Dill worked in Beloved Rogues with actor Harry von Meter in 1917, and it was Dill's last film, though he lived for decades more. (Kolb later returned to films and was a busy Hollywood character actor from the 1930s to the 1950s.)

== Filmography ==
- Beloved Rogues (1917; as Max M. Dill) .... Mike Amsterdammer
- Glory (1917) .... Mike Plotts
- Lonesome Town (1916; as Max M. Dill) .... Mike
- Peck o' Pickles (1916; as Max M. Dill) .... Adolph Busch
- Bluff (1916; as Max M. Dill) .... Mike
- The Three Pals (1916; as Max M. Dill) .... Mike
- A Million for Mary (1916) .... Mike
- Two Flaming Youths (1927) .... Dill
