= Beloved Rogues =

1917 film by Alfred Santell

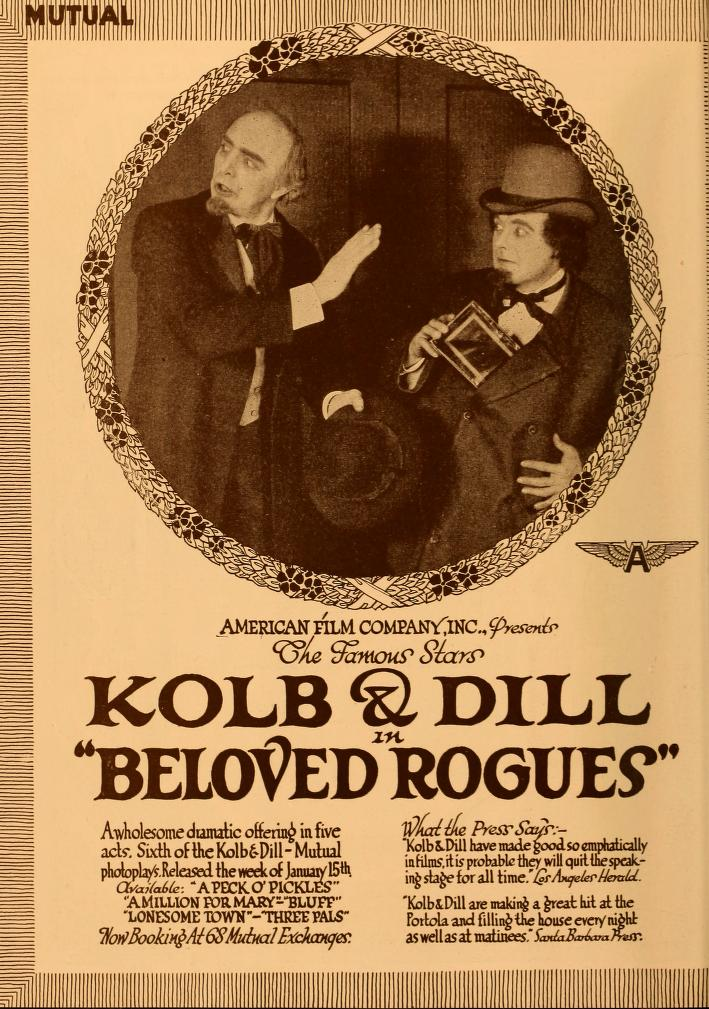
- Directed by: Al Santel
- Written by: Aaron Hoffman (Story); Al Santel (Scenario)
- Starring: C. William Kolb
- Distributed by: Mutual Film
- Release date: January 15, 1917
- Running time: 5 reels
- Country: United States
- Languages: Silent film English intertitles

Beloved Rogues is a 1917 American silent comedy-drama film directed and written by Alfred Santell with the storyline by Aaron Hoffman. It starred C. William Kolb.

A surviving fragment, 1 reel, exists at the Library of Congress.

== Plot ==
The film is about a business deal involving a personal endowment.

== Cast ==
- C. William Kolb .... Louie Vanderiff
- Max M. Dill .... Mike Amsterdammer
- May Cloy .... Madge
- Clarence Burton .... Jack Kennedy
- Harry von Meter .... Andrews
- Tom Chatterton
