= What Happened to Jones (1920 film) =

1920 film by James Cruze

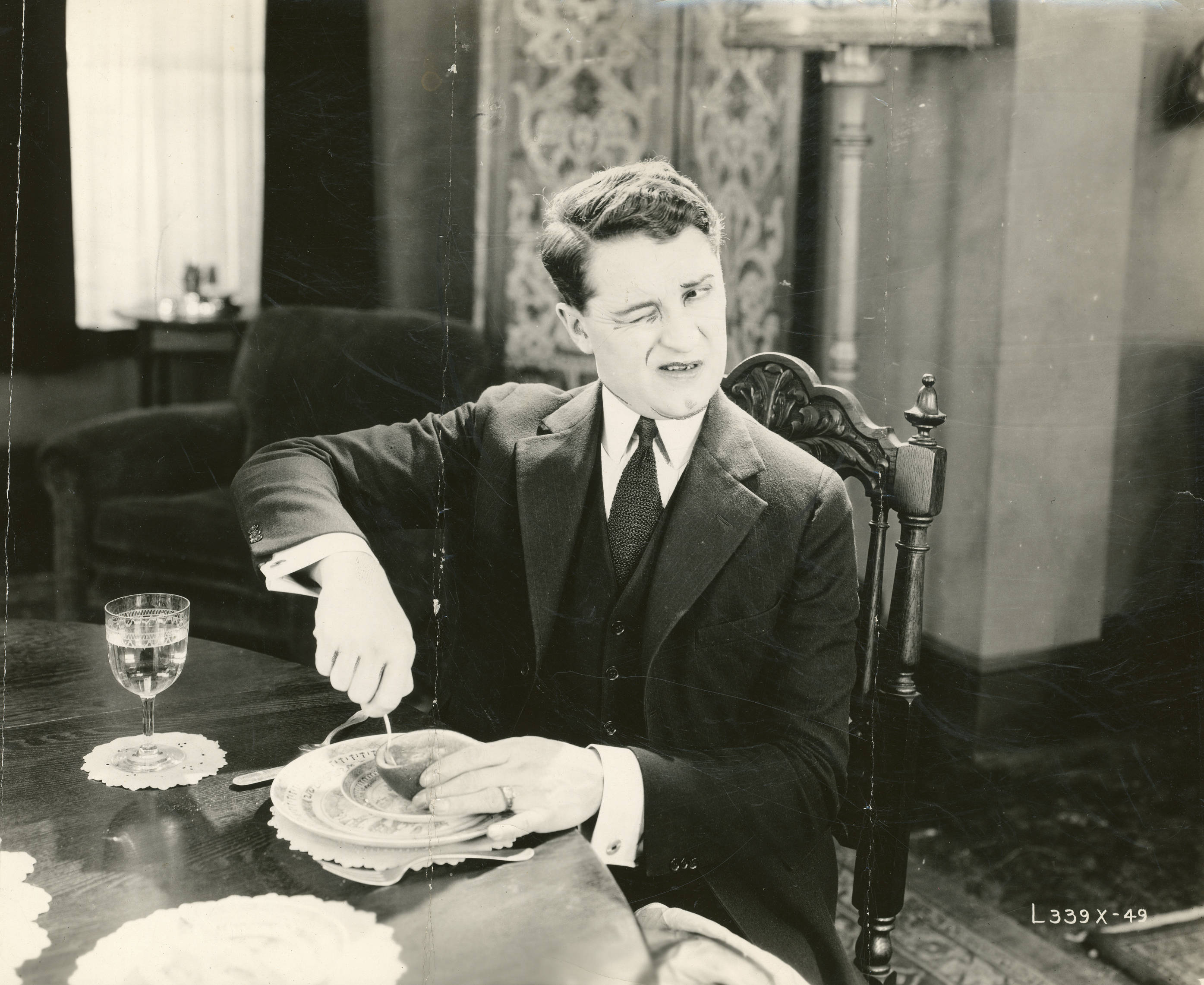
- Still with Bryant Washburn
- Directed by: James Cruze
- Written by: Elmer Harris (scenario)
- Based on: What Happened to Jones by George Broadhurst
- Produced by: Adolph Zukor; Jesse Lasky
- Starring: Bryant Washburn
- Cinematography: H. Kinley Martin
- Distributed by: Paramount Pictures/Artcraft
- Release date: August 15, 1920
- Running time: 5 reels
- Country: United States
- Language: Silent (English intertitles)

What Happened to Jones is a lost 1920 American silent comedy film directed by James Cruze and starring Bryant Washburn. It was based on the 1897 play What Happened to Jones by George Broadhurst. It was produced by Famous Players–Lasky and distributed by Paramount/Artcraft.

== Cast ==
- Bryant Washburn as Jimmie Jones
- Margaret Loomis as Cissy Smith
- J. Maurice Foster as Bobbie Brown
- Frank Jonasson as Anthony Goodley
- Lillian Leighton as Matilda Brown
- Caroline Rankin as Alvina Smith
- Richard Cummings as Green

== Production ==
Some interiors were filmed at the Morosco studios, now Occidental Studios. Filming began in early March and finished later the same month.
