= What Happened to Jones (1926 film) =

1926 film directed by William A. Seiter

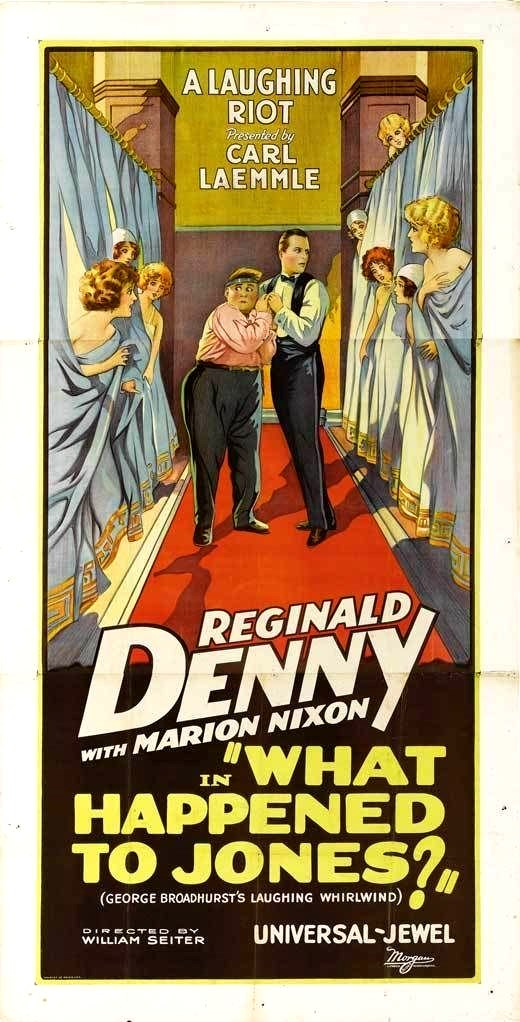
- Theatrical release three-sheet poster
- Directed by: William A. Seiter
- Written by: Melville W. Brown (adaptation, screenplay)
- Based on: What Happened to Jones by George Broadhurst
- Produced by: Carl Laemmle
- Starring: Reginald Denny; Marian Nixon; Otis Harlan
- Cinematography: Arthur L. Todd
- Edited by: John Rawlins
- Distributed by: Universal Pictures
- Release date: February 8, 1926
- Running time: 70 min.
- Country: United States
- Language: Silent (English intertitles)

What Happened to Jones (1926) by William A. Seiter

What Happened to Jones is a 1926 American silent comedy film directed by William A. Seiter and starring Reginald Denny. It was produced and distributed by Universal Pictures. The film is based on the 1897 Broadway play What Happened to Jones by George Broadhurst.

== Plot ==
As described in a review in a film magazine, Tom Jones, who is to be married the next day to Lucille Bigbee, goes home but is inveigled into a poker game. The place is raided and Tom and a fat elderly friend, Ebenezer Goodly, escaping down a fire escape land in a ladies' Turkish bath establishment, where they naturally create a hullabaloo and finally make a getaway in women's clothes, reaching Goodly's home in a milk wagon the next morning. When Tom dons the clothes of Goodly's brother, a bishop, who is expected that morning, he is seen by Mrs. Goodly and has to pose as the bishop.

Complications follow thick and fast including the jealousy of a chap because Tom kisses his sweetheart, and the forcing of Tom as the bishop to officiate at the wedding of his fiancé to another chap. It all turns out right, for she recognizes Tom, says "I Don't" instead of "I Do."

Tom escapes from the waiting cops by grabbing her and the real bishop and getting married in a speeding automobile.

== Cast ==
- Reginald Denny as Tom Jones
- Marian Nixon as Lucille Bigbee
- Melbourne MacDowell as Mr. Bigbee
- Frances Raymond as Mrs. Bigbee
- Otis Harlan as Ebenezer Goodly
- Emily Fitzroy as Mrs. Goodly
- Margaret Quimby as Marjorie Goodly
- Ben Hendricks Jr. as Richard
- William Austin as Henry Fuller
- Nina Romano as Minerva Starlight
- Zasu Pitts as Hilda
- John Elliott as The Bishop
- Edward Cecil as Smith
- Broderick O'Farrell as Rector
- Billy Engle as Milkman (uncredited)

== Preservation ==
Prints of What Happened to Jones are preserved at the Cinematheque Royale de Belgique in Brussels, Filmmuseum in Amsterdam, and UCLA Film and Television Archives.
