= The Law of the Land (film) =

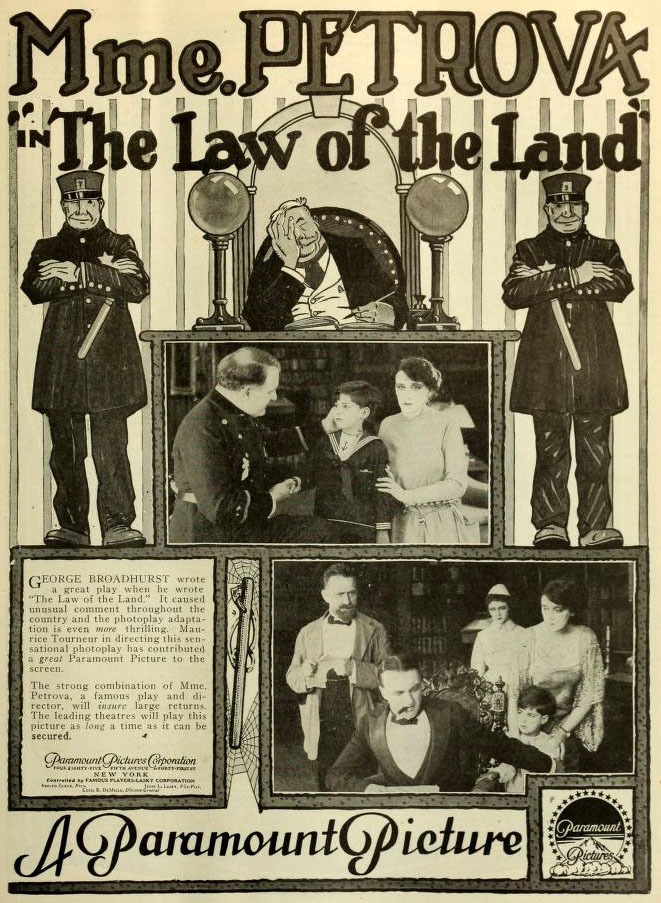
- Directed by: Maurice Tourneur; Charles E. Whittaker (ass't director); Clarence Brown (ass't director)
- Written by: Charles E. Whittaker (scenario)
- Based on: The Law of the Land by George Broadhurst
- Produced by: Jesse L. Lasky
- Starring: Olga Petrova
- Cinematography: John van den Broek
- Edited by: Clarence Brown (uncredited)
- Distributed by: Paramount Pictures
- Release date: August 12, 1917
- Running time: 5 reels
- Country: United States
- Language: Silent (English intertitles)

The Law of the Land (or Law of the Land) is a 1917 silent film starring stage actress turned screen vamp Olga Petrova. The film was directed by Maurice Tourneur and produced by Jesse Lasky.

The story is based on the 1914 play The Law of the Land by George Broadhurst and starred Julia Dean in Petrova's role. Some scenes of this film were shot in Florida. This film is now lost.

== Plot ==
As described in a film magazine, Margaret Harding becomes the wife of Richard Harding to save her mother from ruin. The only happiness in her life is her young son, and one night when Harding threatens to whip the boy to death Margaret shoots him. Geoffrey Morton, who loves Margaret, and Margaret are charged with the crime. However, when Margaret explains to the police inspector the true state of affairs, and when her son shows marks where his father had hit him, Margaret and Geoffrey are exonerated and reunited.

== Cast ==
- Olga Petrova - Margaret Harding
- Wyndham Standing - Richard Harding
- Mahlon Hamilton - Geoffrey Morton
- J.D. Haragan - Brockland
- Robert Vivian - Chetwood
- Riley Hatch - Inspector Cochrane (billed as William Riley Hatch)
- William Conklin
