= Broadway After Dark =

1924 film by Monta Bell

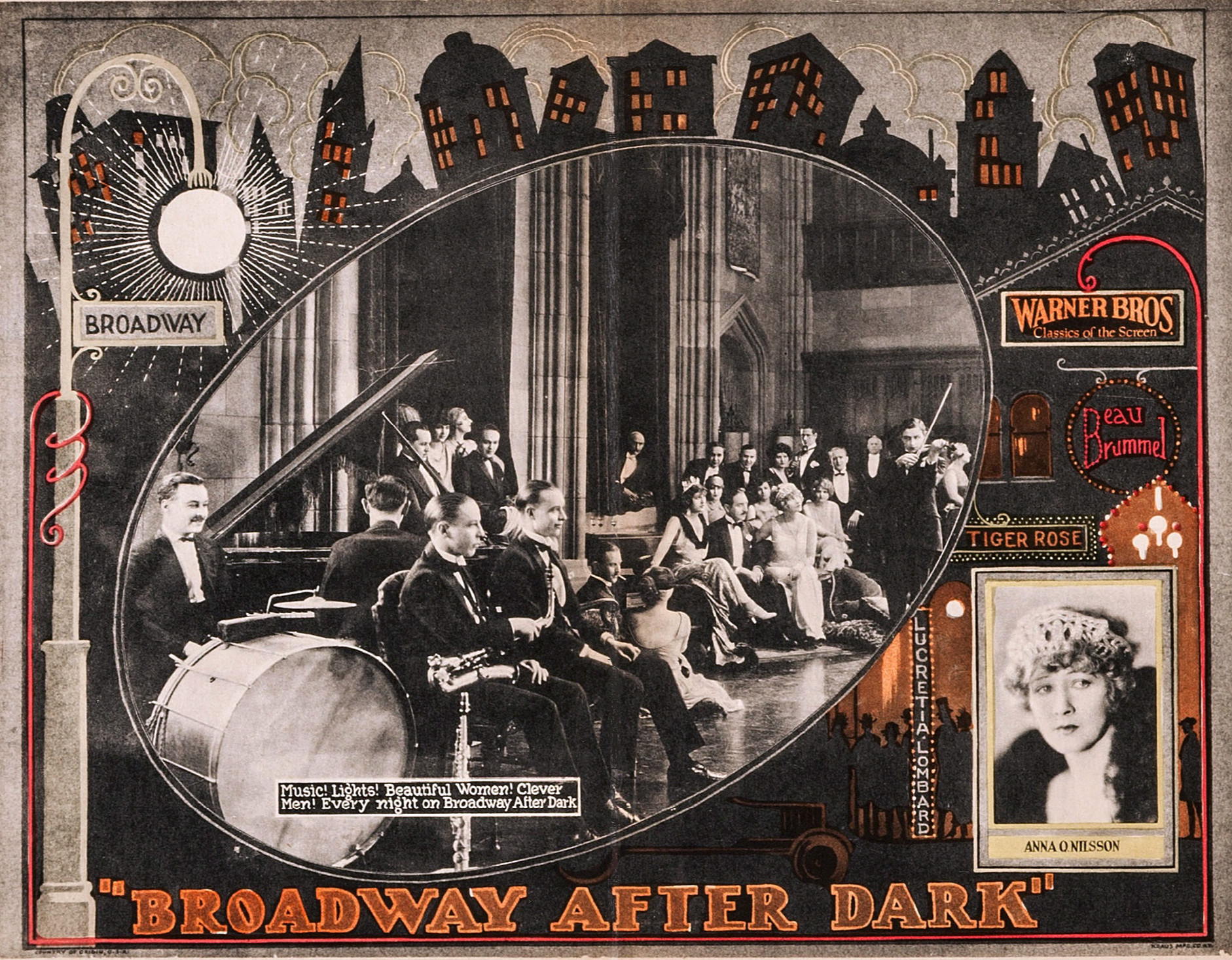
- Lobby card
- Directed by: Monta Bell
- Written by: Douglas Z. Doty
- Based on: Broadway After Dark by Owen Davis
- Produced by: Harry Rapf
- Cinematography: Charles Van Enger
- Production company: Harry Rapf Productions
- Distributed by: Warner Bros.
- Release date: May 31, 1924
- Running time: 70 minutes
- Country: United States
- Language: Silent (English intertitles)
- Budget: $110,000
- Box office: $360,000

Broadway After Dark is a 1924 American silent comedy film directed by Monta Bell and starring Adolphe Menjou, Norma Shearer, and Anna Q. Nilsson.

== Plot ==
As described in a film magazine review, Rose Dulane, a waitress at a restaurant, is fascinated by a man to whom she confides that she is guilty of a petty theft. He is a detective and arrests her. She serves time and, upon release, finally lands a job in a minor theatrical boarding house. There she meets Ralph Norton, a well-to-do Broadway rounder, having a look at life in a less luxurious atmosphere. Norton is attracted by Rose and they attend the Actors' Equity ball. He proves to be her friend, rescues her from the detective's persecutions, and wins her love.

== Cast ==
- Adolphe Menjou as Ralph Norton
- Norma Shearer as Rose Dulane
- Anna Q. Nilsson as Helen Tremaine
- Edmund Burns as Jack Devlin
- Carmel Myers as Lenore Vance
- Vera Lewis as Mrs. Smith
- Willard Louis as Slim Scott
- Mervyn LeRoy as Carl Fisher
- James Quinn as Ed Fisher
- Edgar Norton as The Old Actor
- Gladys Tennyson as Vera
- Ethel Browning as The Chorus Girl
- Otto Hoffman as Norton's Valet
- Lew Harvey as Tom Devery
- Michael Dark as George Vance
- Fred Stone as himself, Cameo Appearance
- Dorothy Stone as herself, Cameo Appearance
- Mary Eaton as herself, Cameo Appearance
- Raymond Hitchcock as himself, Cameo Appearance
- Elsie Ferguson as herself, Cameo Appearance
- Florence Moore as herself, Cameo Appearance
- James J. Corbett as himself, Cameo Appearance
- John Steel as himself, Cameo Appearance
- Frank Tinney as himself, Cameo Appearance
- Paul Whiteman as himself, Cameo Appearance
- Irene Castle as herself, Cameo Appearance
- Buster West as himself, Cameo Appearance

== Box office ==
According to Warner Bros records the film earned $320,000 domestically and $40,000 foreign.

== Preservation ==
With no copies of Broadway After Dark in any film archives, it is a lost film.

== Bibliography ==
- Jack Jacobs & Myron Braum. The films of Norma Shearer. A. S. Barnes, 1976.
