= The Secret of Eve =

- Directed by: Perry N. Vekroff
- Written by: Wallace C. Clifton
- Based on: story by Aaron Hoffman
- Starring: Olga Petrova
- Cinematography: Neil Bergman
- Production companies: Popular Plays and Players
- Distributed by: Metro Pictures
- Release date: February 26, 1917
- Running time: 5 reels
- Country: USA
- Language: Silent..English titles

The Secret of Eve is a lost 1917 silent film drama directed by Perry N. Vekroff and starring Olga Petrova. It was produced by Popular Plays and Players and distributed through Metro Pictures.

== Cast ==
- Olga Petrova - Eve, in the Garden of Eden/ Hagar, the Gypsy Woman/ Eve, the Quakeress/ Eve, the Wife of Brandon
- Arthur Hoops - Arthur Brandon
- William L. Hinckley - Robert Blair
- Edward Roseman - Fothergill
- Laurie Mackin - Deborah, Wife of Fothergill
- Florence Moore - Rosa
- George Morrell - Beppo
