= Cenere =

- Publicity still of Eleonora Duse and Febo Mari in Cenere
- Directed by: Febo Mari
- Written by: Febo Mari, Eleonora Duse
- Produced by: Arturo Ambrosio
- Starring: Eleonora Duse; Febo Mari
- Cinematography: Eugenio Bava
- Distributed by: The Ambrosio Film Co.
- Release date: 1916 (Italy)
- Running time: 38 minutes
- Country: Italy

Cenere is a 1916 silent film directed by and starring Febo Mari. It is adapted from the 1904 novel by the Nobel Prize-winning Sardinian writer Grazia Deledda. It is notable as the only film performance by the Italian theater star Eleonora Duse.

== Plot ==
Cenere (1916)

Rosalia Derios is an unmarried woman in a small Sardinian village whose lover abandons her before the birth of their son, whom she names Anania. Realizing that she will not be able to raise the child properly, she gives full custody of Anania to her former lover. However, she entrusts the boy with a sacred amulet before she leaves. Anania grows to adulthood and retains possession of the amulet, but he is haunted by his mother’s absence and tries to locate her. He pushes aside his career prospects and cancels his plans for marriage in order to pursue his search for Rosalia. Anania's search proves successful and he locates his mother but Rosalia cannot take the shock of being reunited with her adult son and kills herself.

== Production ==
When Eleonora Duse was approached in 1916 to appear in a film adaptation of Cenere, she had been absent from performing on stage for seven years. Duse expressed deep respect for the source material and its potential as a film. She later explained her return to acting in this production by stating: “I have been persuaded to create the character of Rosalia Derios, from the novel by Grazia Deledda, because it seemed to me that in the sorrowful figure of the mother, all sacrifice for her son, a figure moving in an austere and solemn landscape, would assume the total and clear plastic and spiritual significance that the silent theater must force itself to realize.”

Duse co-wrote the screenplay for Cenere with Febo Mari, her director and co-star. The film was shot over a four-month period on locations across Sardinia.

Duse initially had hopes for Cenere to open a new career in film acting. But upon seeing the finished film, she was disappointed in both the production and her performance. "I made the same mistake that nearly everyone has made," she said after viewing herself on screen. "But something quite different is needed. I am too old for it. Isn't it a pity?" Duse later wrote to the French singer Yvette Guilbert with the request not to see “that stupid thing, because you’ll find nothing, or almost nothing, of me in that film.”
