= Edward Martindel =

American actor (1876–1955)

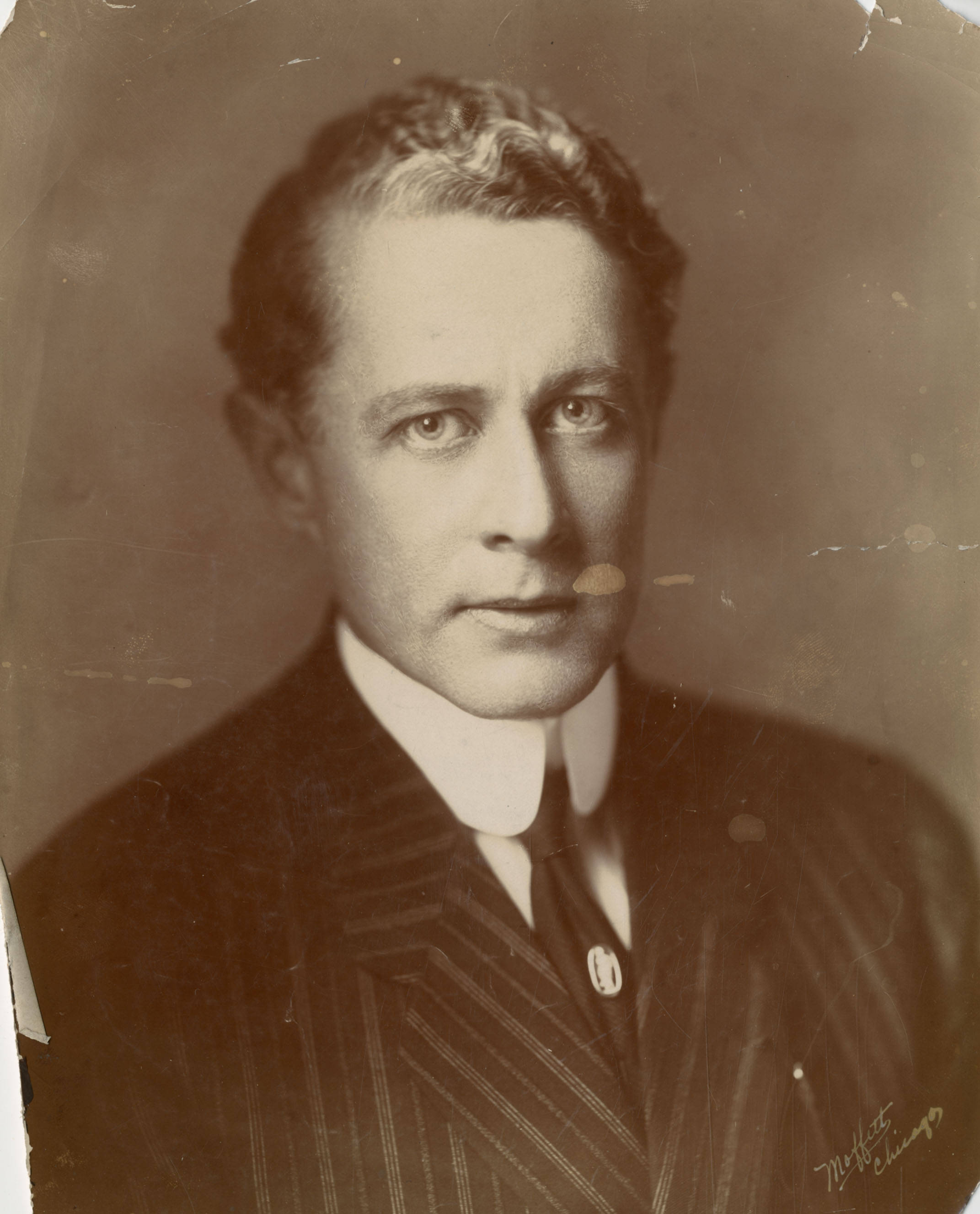
- Martindel in 1909
- Born: July 8, 1876; Hamilton, Ohio, U.S.
- Died: May 4, 1955 (aged 78); Los Angeles, California, U.S.
- Resting place: Chapel of the Pines Crematory
- Occupation: Actor
- Years active: 1915–1946
- Spouse: Jane Martindel (m. 1909)

Edward Martindel (July 8, 1876 – May 4, 1955) was an American stage and film actor who appeared on Broadway and in more than 80 films between 1915 and 1946.

Born in Hamilton, Ohio, he was the son of Dr. and Mrs. Frank Martindell. His singing debut came under the management of Henry Savage. He appeared in 16 Broadway plays, beginning with Dolly Varden (1902) and ending with The Little Blue Devil (1919).

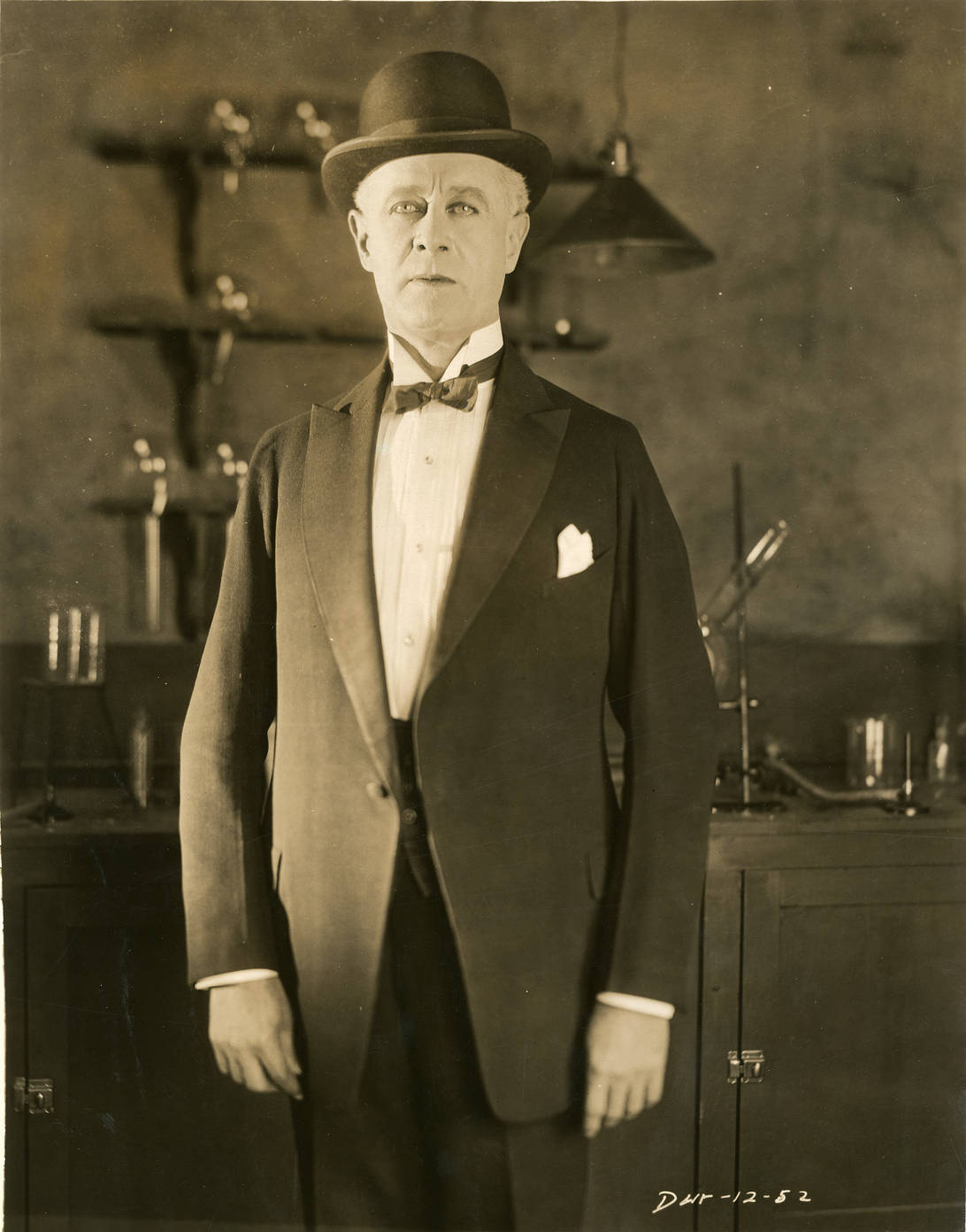
Martindel in 1923

He died on May 4, 1955, in Los Angeles, California, from a heart attack. His grave is located at Chapel of the Pines Crematory.

== Selected filmography ==
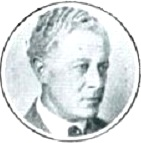
From an ad for Hail the Woman (1921)

Year	Title	Role	Notes
1916	The Scarlet Woman	Hanlin Davis	
1916	The Eternal Question	Allen Tait	
1917	A Rich Man's Plaything	'Iron' Lloyd	
1920	The Furnace	Count Svenson	
1920	Unseen Forces	George Brunton	
1921	Ducks and Drakes	Dick Chiltern	
1921	Greater Than Love	Frank Norwood	
1921	Hail the Woman	Wyndham Gray	
1922	Manslaughter	Wiley	
1922	The Ordeal	Sir Francis Maynard	
1922	The Glory of Clementina	Quixtus	
1923	The Day of Faith	Uncle Mortimer	
1924	Love's Whirlpool	Richard Milton	
1925	Lady Windermere's Fan	Lord Augustus Lorton	Credited as Edw. Martindel
1926	You'd Be Surprised	Mr. White, The District Attorney	
1926	Somebody's Mother	Mary's Lawyer	
1926	The Duchess of Buffalo	Grand Duke Gregory Alexandrovich	
1927	Venus of Venice	Journalist	
1927	Taxi! Taxi!	David Parmalee	
1927	Children of Divorce	Tom Larrabee	
1927	In Old Kentucky	Mr. Brierly	
1928	The Singing Fool	Louis Marcus	
1928	The Desert Bride		
1929	Why Be Good?	Winthrop Peabody Sr.	
1929	The Desert Song	General Bierbeau	
1929	The Aviator	Gordon	
1930	Song of the West	Colonel	
1930	Check and Double Check	John Blair	
1931	Blonde Crazy	Jeweler	Uncredited
1932	American Madness	Ames	Uncredited
