= Arthur Hoops =

American actor

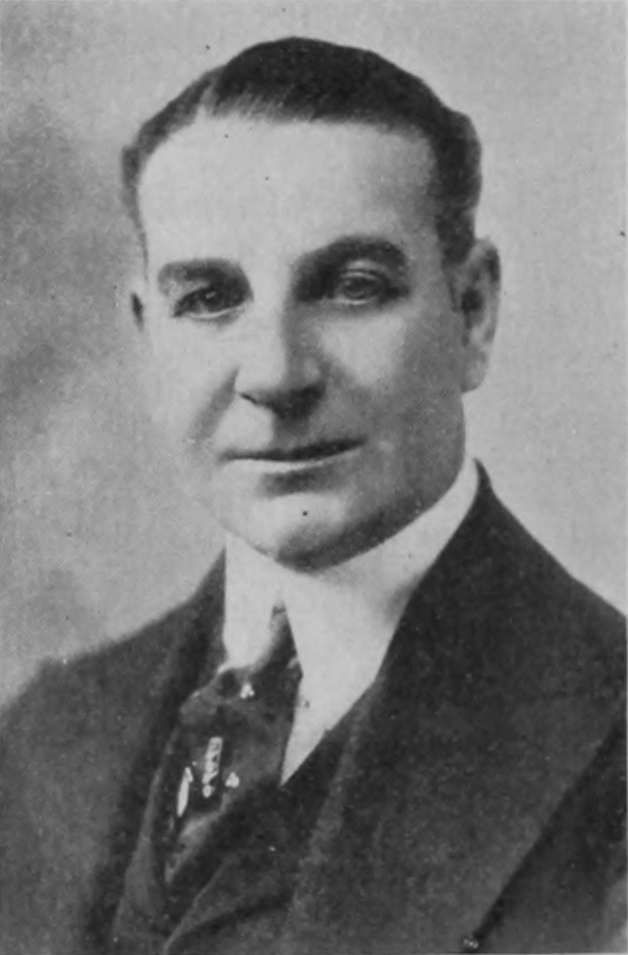
- Born: 1870; Chicago, Illinois, US
- Died: September 16, 1916 (aged 45 - 46); Long Island City New York, New York, United States
- Occupation: Actor
- Years active: 1900–1916

Arthur Hoops (1870 – September 17, 1916) was an American stage and screen actor.

== Biography ==
Born in Chicago in 1870, Hoops created the role of the secretary in the premiere of Henry Guy Carleton's Ambition at the Fifth Avenue Theatre on Broadway in 1895. On the stage he was primarily associated with actor James K. Hackett. From 1900 on Hoops supported or costarred with Hackett in three Ruritanian themed plays Rupert of Hentzau, The Pride of Jennico and most famously The Prisoner of Zenda. Hoops also appeared in Alice of Old Vincennes in 1901 with Virginia Harned. Both he and Hackett were well over 6'4" and made worthy adversaries in the famous duelling scene from Zenda. It was the most famous duelling scene in the American theatre at the turn of the 20th century.

Hoops moved on to silent film in 1914. As his screen career progressed Hoops appeared in several films with Mary Pickford, one film with Marguerite Clark and finished his career in over half a dozen films at Metro Studios starring early screen vamp Olga Petrova. Hoops died in Los Angeles at 46 following a heart attack.

== Selected filmography ==
Year	Title	Role	Notes
1914	The Better Man	Reverend Lionel Barmore	
1914	The Lost Paradise	Ralph Standish	
1914	Such a Little Queen	Prince Eugene	
1914	The Straight Road	Douglas Aines	
1914	Aristocracy	Prince Emil von Haldenwald	
1915	Mistress Nell	Duke of Buckingham	
1915	Gretna Green	Sir William Chetwynde	
1915	Should A Mother Tell?	Baron Gauntier	
1915	The Song of Hate	Baron Scarpia	
1915	Esmerelda	Count de Montessin	
1915	The Danger Signal	Danny Canavan	
1916	The Lure of Heart's Desire	Thomas Martin	
1916	Playing With Fire	Geoffrey Vane	
1916	The Scarlet Woman	Clinton Hastings	
1916	The Eternal Question	Grand Duke of Serdian	
1916	Extravagance	Howard Dundore	
1917	Bridges Burned	O'Farrell	
1917	The Secret of Eve	Arthur Brandon	
