= Lillian Trimble Bradley =

American theatre director and playwright

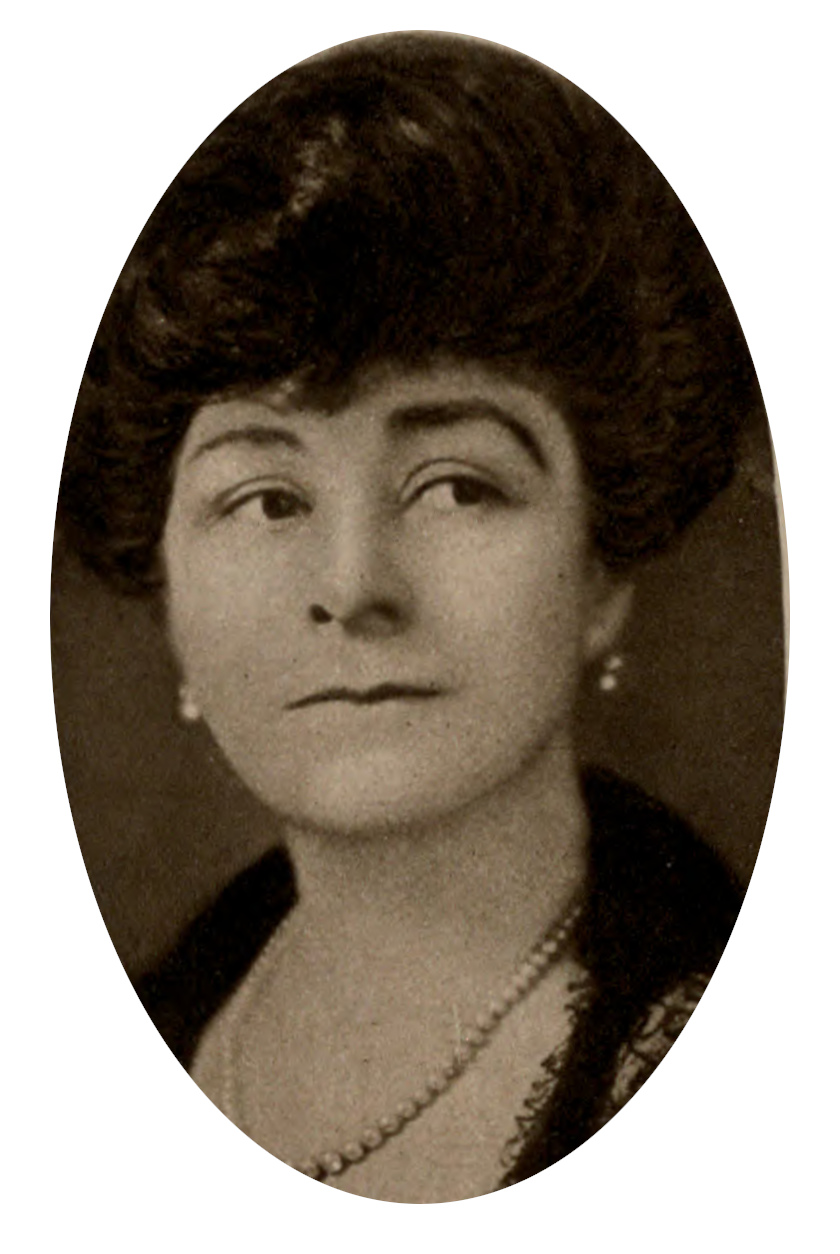
- Born: 1875; Milton, Kentucky
- Died: 1959 (aged 83–84); Santa Barbara, California
- Occupation(s): Theatre director, playwright
- Spouses: D. I. Bradley (died 1925); George Broadhurst (died 1952)

Lillian Trimble Bradley (1875 – 1959) was an American theatrical director and playwright, considered the first female director on Broadway. After attending schools in Paris in her youth, Bradley went to study at the Moscow Art Theatre, where she directed four student productions for Constantin Stanislavski's group. By the time she finished her studies she had written two plays and had ambitions to move back to the United States to become a stage director. Once there, Bradley met producer George Broadhurst and her career of 41 years was launched.

== Early life ==
Lillian Trimble Bradley was born in Milton, Kentucky, in 1879. Her family was always on the move, so from a young age, Bradley set about to design her own education. She was educated in a convent school in Paris, where she attended the theatre regularly and becoming an apprentice to French actor André Antoine. She assisted with two of Antoine's productions.

Bradley then studied at the Moscow Art Theatre, where she directed four student productions for actor and director Constantin Stanislavski and learned about technical theatre. By the time her studies in Moscow ended, she had written two plays and returned to the United States with ambitions to become a stage director.

Bradley married a wealthy stock broker, D. I. Bradley, who was 65 to her 28. After his death, Bradley inherited his land and money which she used to buy a large house in which she built a laboratory for lighting and set design experimentations.

== Career ==
=== The Broadhurst Theatre ===
Bradley became associated with producer George Broadhurst in 1918. Before then, theatre managers refused to believe that a woman could master the infinite technical detail which went with the production of even the simplest play. Broadhurst expressed interest in producing Bradley's play, The Woman on the Index, and Bradley agreed under the condition that she would assist with the direction. Later that year, Broadhurst appointed Bradley as the general stage director of the Broadhurst Theatre. This appointment earned Bradley the title “first American woman director”. She continued to direct under Broadhurst's management until 1924. During her time at the Broadhurst Theatre, Bradley directed eight Broadway productions including The Wonderful Things (1920), Come Seven (1920), Tarzan of the Apes (1921), and Izzy (1924). She married Broadhurst in 1925 and appears to have retired and moved to Santa Barbara, where Broadhurst died in 1952 and Bradley died in 1959.

=== The Crimson Alibi ===
The production of The Crimson Alibi established Bradley as a director. A New York Times review praised it, saying:

“the production of plays and its infinite detail – the working out of the lighting, etc. – have been regarded as man’s work, and Mrs. Bradley is probably the first woman in the country to go into it as a profession. There are, of course, several women playwrights, such as Rachel Crothers, who direct their own plays, but they are playwrights primarily, and directors secondarily. Mrs. Bradley, although she has written plays, did so only as a means to an end – and that end was directing.”

While playwright Edith Ellis directed The Return of Eve in 1908, based on reviews, Bradley was seen as the first woman director because she was able to project her identity in her own productions. While some critics viewed Bradley's direction as similar to a man's, others marked the work as specifically feminine.

=== Directing melodrama ===
Melodrama was popular at the time, and much of Bradley's work fell into this category. “Bradley believe[s] in melodrama as the most effective stage presentation of the period as it has been at all times.” Bradley wrote and directed plays that starred women, yet relied on the melodramatic trope of a woman getting and keeping a man's attention. Bradley's debut production The Woman on the Index, is a melodrama which goes against gender expectations by having the man in the passive role and portrayed women as the instigators of action, but the play still left both its female leads clamoring for the role of the “good wife” as their goal. It was not her work on stage but rather her work behind the scenes that challenged gender expectations of the time. When asked what she thought of stage directing as a profession for women, Mrs. Bradley laughed and said “Frankly, I can not honestly recommend it, though personally I love my work. Stage directing means very hard work, meals at odd times, loss of sleep, and no leisure”
