= What Happened to Jones (play) =

1897 farce by George Broadhurst

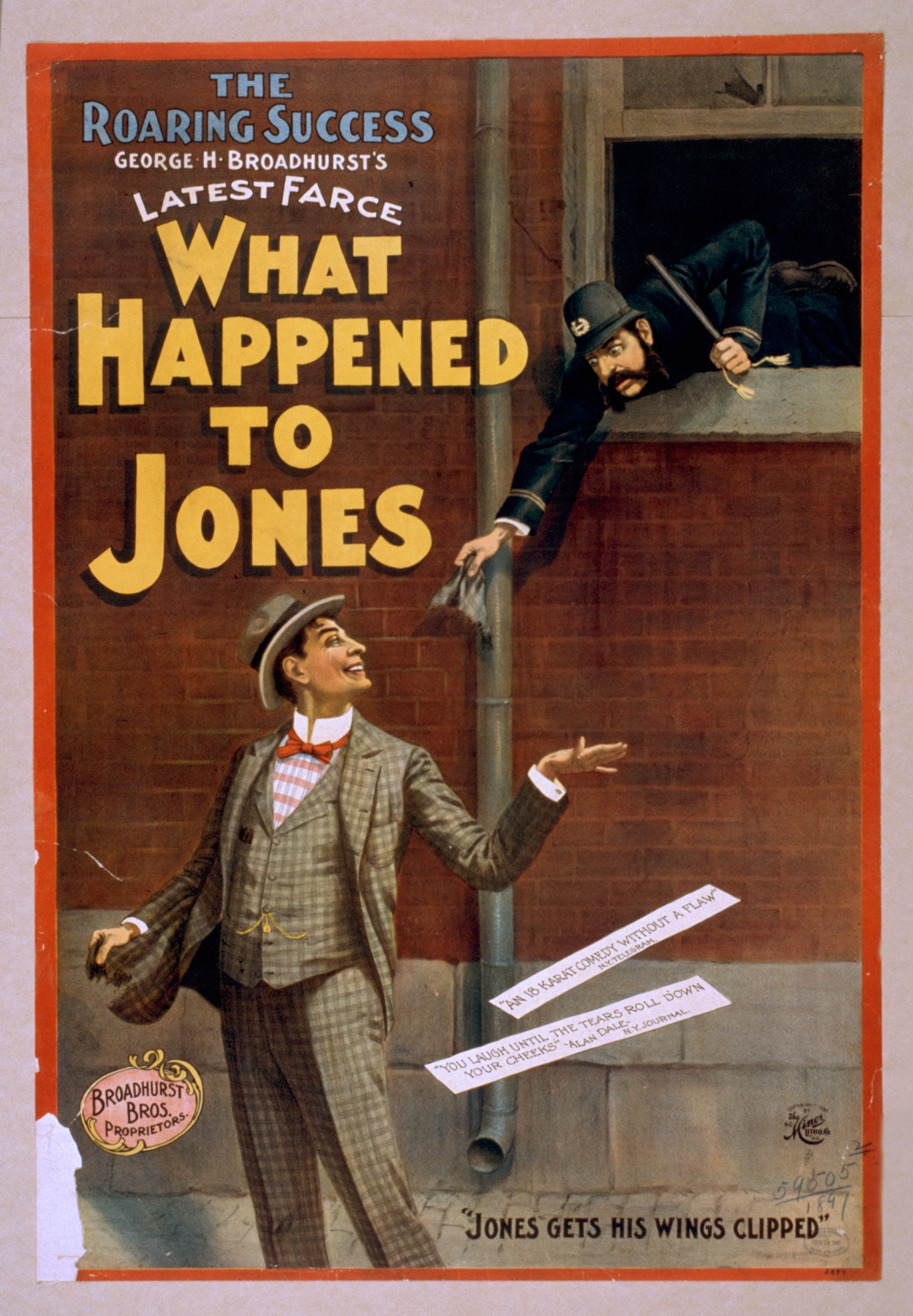
- Original language: English
- Written by: George Broadhurst

Premiere
- Date: 30 August 1897
- Place: Manhattan Theatre

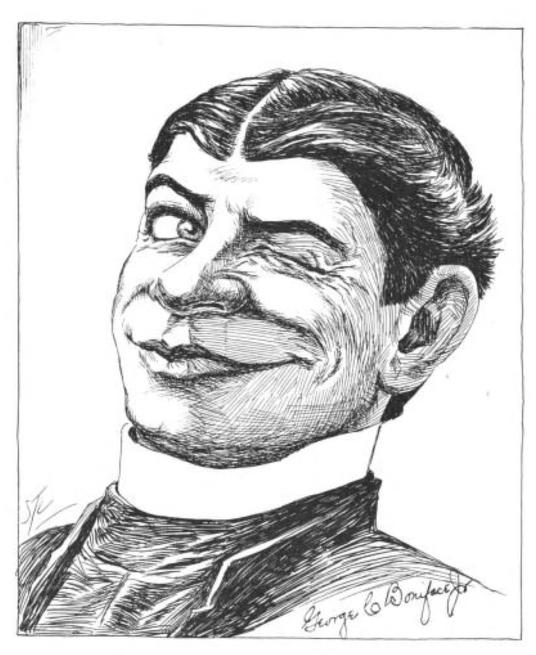
Caricature of George C. Boniface Jr. as Jones

What Happened to Jones is an 1897 farce by George Broadhurst. It was his first successful play and remained popular for many years, and was also adapted into three silent films.

== Production ==
What Happened to Jones was Broadhurst's second play to be staged, after the flop of his first play, The Speculator (1896). Broadhurst had to become his own producer, with funding from his brother Thomas, as he could find no one else to take it on.

After four warmup performances in New Haven, Connecticut, the play debuted on Broadway at the Manhattan Theatre on August 30, 1897. It moved to the Bijou Theatre on October 4, playing thru November 13, and after a week off, played Thanksgiving week at the Grand Opera House. That total run was just under 100 performances. The company then took it on tour. A largely new cast returned to New York at the Bijou in February 1898.

It had its London debut at The Strand on April 9, 1898, and enjoyed a long run of 383 performances, and was the last success of John S. Clarke as manager of the Strand. Charles Arnold starred in this production, and then successfully took it abroad, including to Australia and South Africa. It was revived at London's Terry's Theatre from January 22, 1900.

In 1915, McClure's magazine noted Broadhurst's and Arnold's success with the play, that Jones was still being played by stock houses some 18 years after its debut, and could be revived successfully on Broadway if Broadhurst was not so focused on new plays.

In 2000, the Metropolitan Playhouse in New York mounted a revised version of the play with updated dialogue.

== Reception ==
The critical reviews of the play were lukewarm at best, but acknowledged that audiences were laughing heartily throughout. The Sun wrote that "there was nothing ingeniously novel in the design of the piece, nor any particularly bright wit or unctuous humor," but it "should not be underrated as a farce of the uproarious kind. It made its first New York audience laugh a great deal." The New York Times found it "an exceedingly artificial piece in which the artifice is plainly apparent from first to last to the critical playgoer, who finds in it some really funny passages, and many others which are almost depressing in spite of the hard labor of the performers." Of George C. Boniface, Jr.'s performance as Jones, the Times said he "has a droll and quizzical personality, but he has been too busily employed in Mr. Hoyt's farces and comic opera to learn to act."

== Broadway cast ==
- George C. Boniface Jr. as Jones
- George Ober at Ebenezer Goodly
- R.F. Cotton at Rev. Anthony Goodly
- William Bernard as Richard Heatherly
- Frank Currier as William Bigbee
- J.W. Cope as Thomas Holder
- Phyllis McKee Rankin as Matilda Goodly
- Mrs. Eberle as Alvina Starlight
- Anna Belmont as Cissy
- Kathryn Osterman as Marjorie
- Rose Stuart as Minerva
- Pearl Andrews as Helma

== Adaptations ==
The play was adapted to silent films in 1915, 1920, and 1926. The 1915 film was directed by and starred Fred Mace as Jones. The 1920 version starred Bryant Washburn. The 1926 film was directed by William A. Seiter and starred Reginald Denny.
