= Bridges Burned =

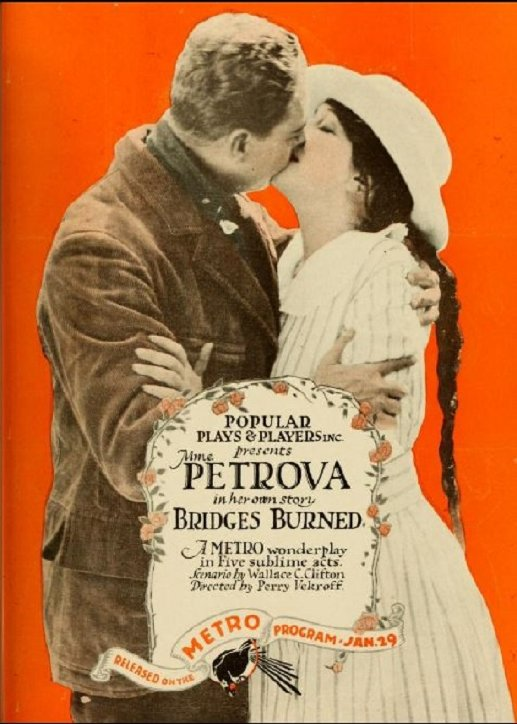
- Film program
- Directed by: Perry N. Vekroff
- Written by: Olga Petrova (story); Wallace C. Clifton (scenario)
- Starring: Olga Petrova
- Cinematography: Neil Bergman
- Production companies: Popular Plays and Players
- Distributed by: Metro Pictures
- Release date: February 5, 1917
- Running time: 5 reels
- Country: USA
- Language: Silent...English intertitles

Bridges Burned is a lost 1917 silent film drama directed by Perry N. Vekroff and starring Olga Petrova. Popular Plays and Players produced while Metro Pictures distributed.

== Cast ==
- Olga Petrova - Mary O'Brien
- Mahlon Hamilton - Ernest Randal
- Arthur Hoops - O'Farrell
- Maury Steuart - Mary's Son
- Robert Broderick - Thomas O'Brien
- Mathilde Brundage - Norah
- Louis Stern - Solicitor
- Thomas Cameron
