= George Broadhurst =

American dramatist

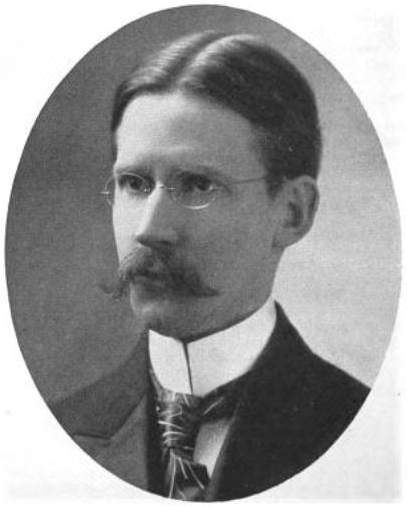
- In The Sketch, 6 September 1899
- Born: June 3, 1866; Walsall, England
- Died: January 31, 1952 (aged 85); Santa Barbara, California, United States
- Resting place: Santa Barbara, California
- Occupations: Playwright, theatre manager, director, producer
- Spouses: Ida Raymond Broadhurst (m. 1887; div. 1925), Lillian Trimble Bradley (m. 1925)
- Children: 2
- Writing career
- Language: English
- Period: 1896–1924
- Genres: Farce; drama; musical theatre
- Notable works: What Happened to Jones; The Law of the Land

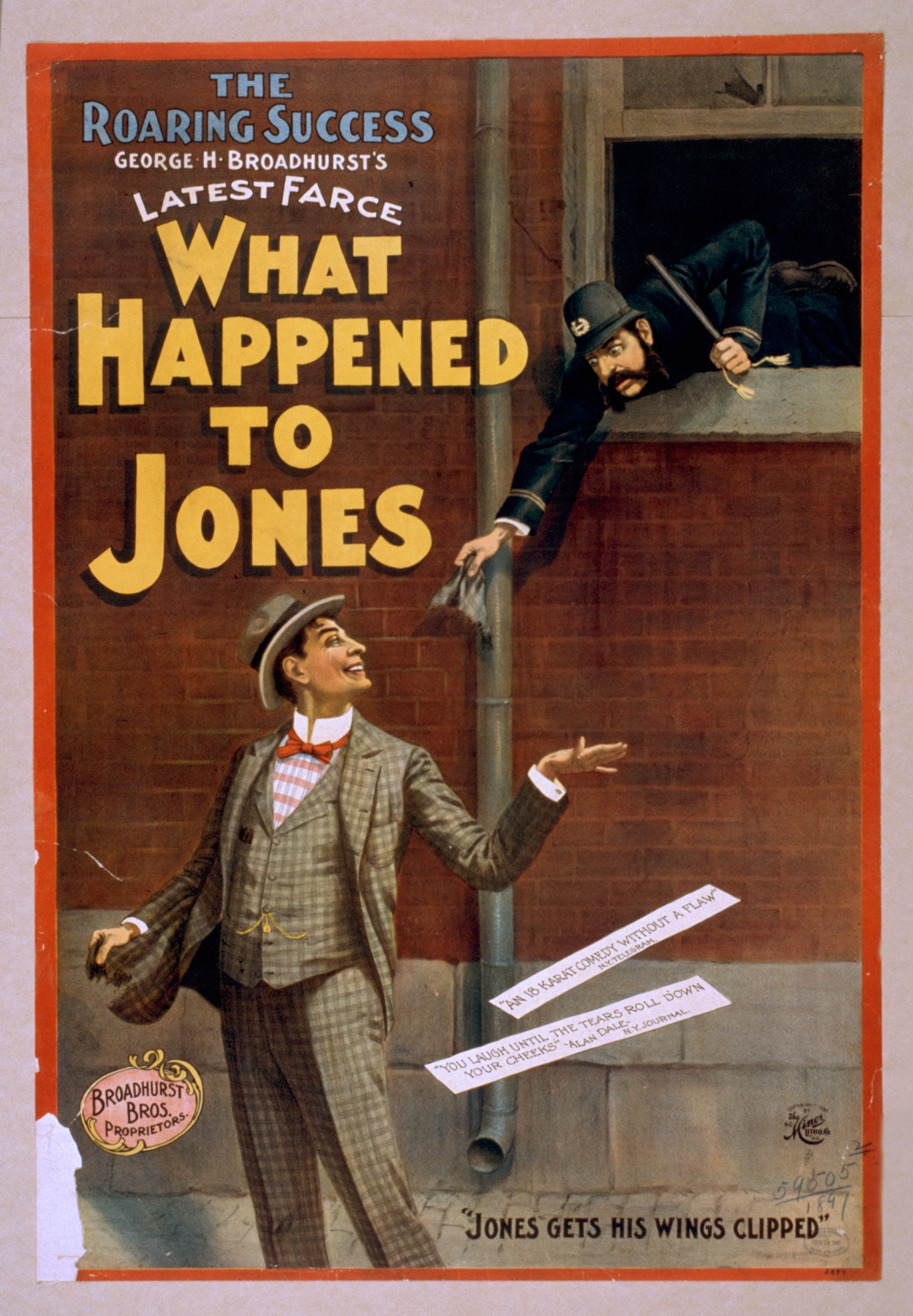
Poster for Broadhurst's What Happened to Jones, 1897 (Library of Congress)

George Howells Broadhurst (June 3, 1866 – January 31, 1952) was an Anglo-American theatre owner/manager, director, producer and playwright. His plays were most popular from the late 1890s into the 1920s.

== Biography ==
Broadhurst was born in Walsall, England, in 1866. In 1882 he emigrated to the United States where, while working for the Chicago Board of Trade, he began writing plays, the first of which, The Speculator, was based on his work there. He later moved into production and direction.

He also managed theatres in Milwaukee, Baltimore, and San Francisco, and in 1917 in partnership with the Shubert brothers he built and opened Broadhurst Theatre in New York. He staged a number of plays in his eponymous theatre until 1924, and continued to co-own the theatre with the Shuberts until his death in 1952. He was survived by his wife, director and playwright Lillian Trimble Bradley.

Broadhurst and his wife lived in Santa Barbara, California, for the last ten years of his life, and he is buried there.

== Works ==
Broadhurst wrote almost 30 plays, including the farces What Happened to Jones (1897), The Wrong Mr. Wright (1897), and Why Smith Left Home (1899) (all of which did better in London than in New York), and plays The Man of the Hour (1906), Bought and Paid For (1911), The Law of the Land (1914), and The Crimson Alibi (1919). With Frederic Ranken he co-authored both the book and lyrics to the 1903 Broadway musical Nancy Brown which was created as a starring vehicle for the actress Marie Cahill.

His work was once described as one "who had a knack for the sort of melodrama that poses as a serious study of morals."
