= Olga Petrova =

British-American actress, screenwriter and playwright (1884–1977)

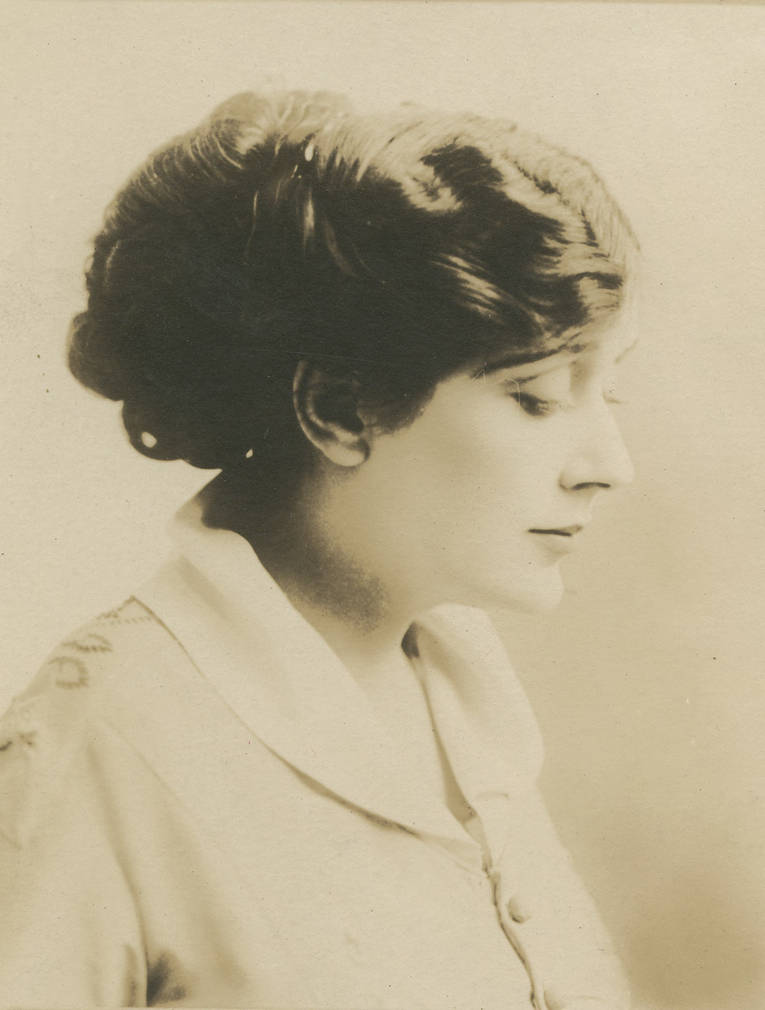
- Petrova, c. 1917
- Born: Ellen Constance Muriel Harding; May 10, 1884; England (probably Portsea, Portsmouth, Hampshire)
- Died: November 30, 1977 (aged 93); Clearwater, Florida, U.S.
- Other name: Madame Petrova
- Occupations: Actress, screenwriter, playwright
- Years active: 1911–1928
- Spouse(s): Louis Willoughby (1939-1968; his death); Dr. John Dillon Stewart (physician) (1913-1938; his death)

Olga Petrova (born Muriel Harding; 10 May 1884 – 30 November 1977) was a British-American actress, screenwriter, and playwright.

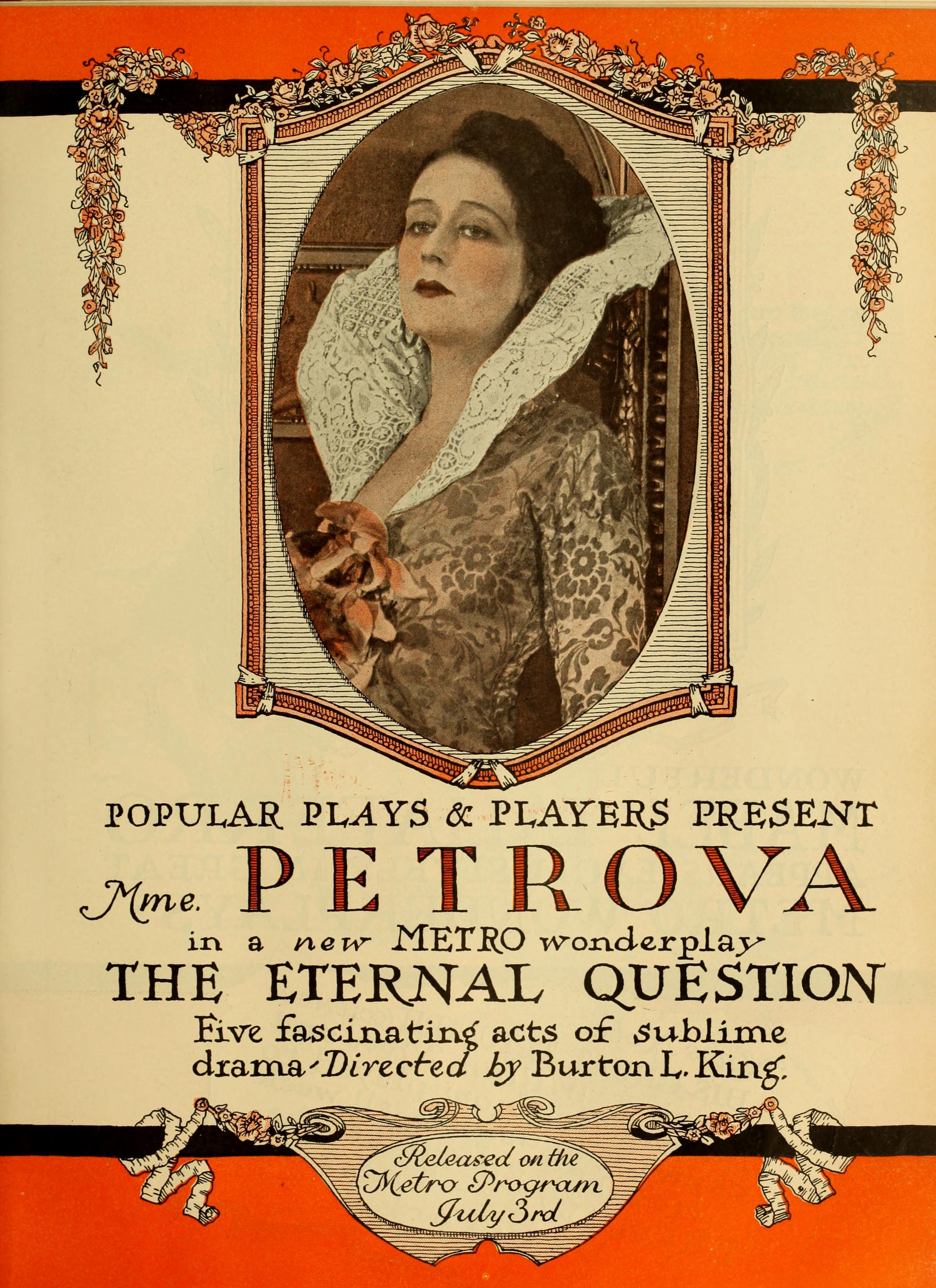
The Eternal Question (1916)

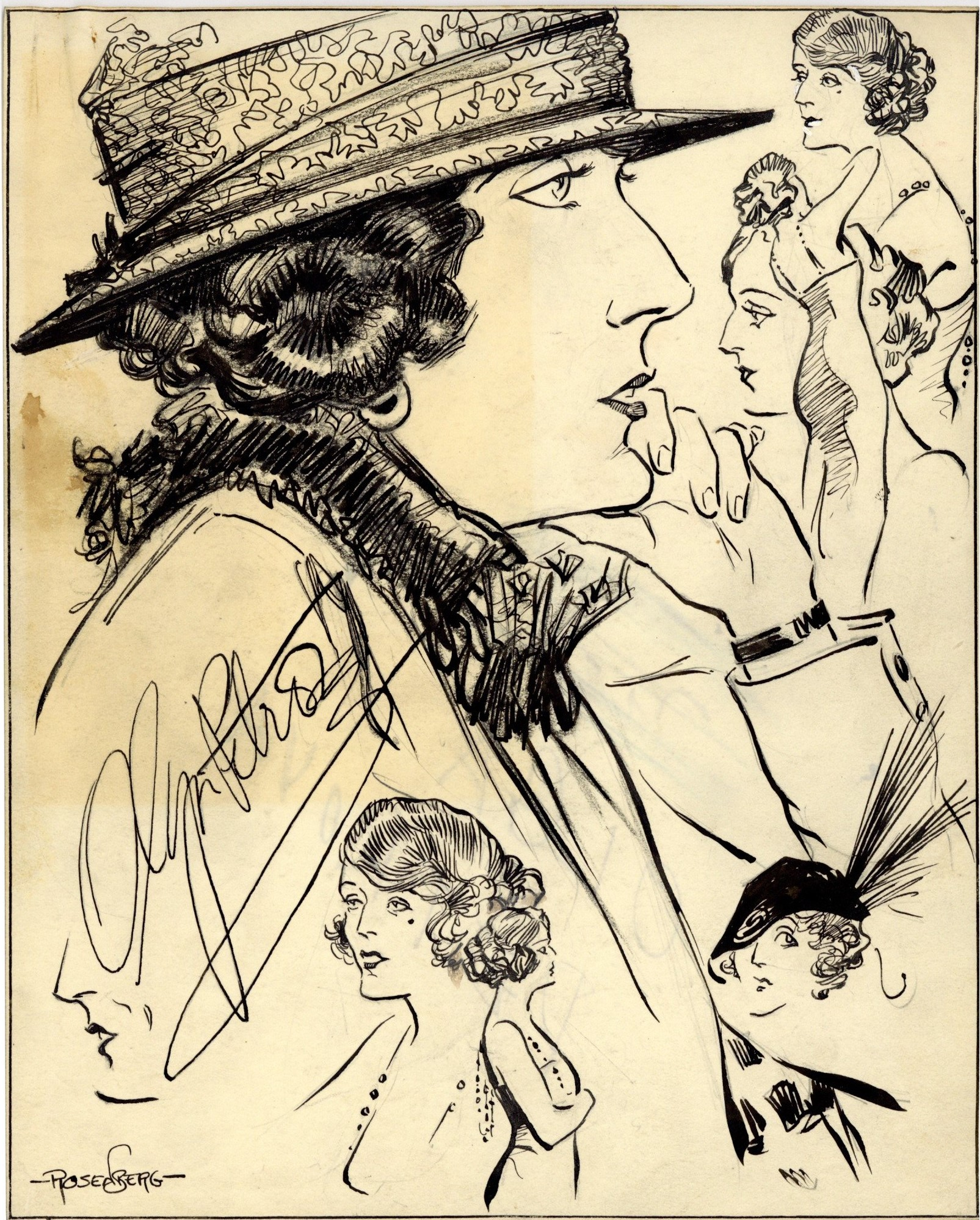
Olga Petrova autographed drawing by Manuel Rosenberg, 1921

== Origins ==
In adulthood, Olga Petrova insisted that she had been born in Warsaw, Poland, then part of the Russian Empire, and throughout her life, she spoke with an appropriate accent, even in private. However, it was widely accepted later in her career that she was in reality Muriel Harding, born in England (but not in London, as sometimes stated erroneously). Her birth name probably was Ellen Constance Muriel Harding, born in Portsea, Hampshire, the daughter of Ellen and Herbert Harding, who was a municipal tax collector. The family moved shortly after her birth to Tuebrook, Liverpool, where she grew up and where her younger siblings were born.

== Career ==
Harding left home after feeling stifled by her father's strict rules. According to her memoir, she became a governess, but soon moved to London for a career on the stage. She probably chose the name and persona of Madame Olga Petrova herself, though later publicity suggested that the name was chosen by a producer, to reflect the penchant at the time for elegant Russian stars such as Anna Pavlova. In any event, Petrova began to present herself as a glamorous Russian or Polish actress. She made her first notable appearance under that name at the London Pavilion in April 1911, and her success led to her being quickly signed up for the Folies-Bergere cabaret in New York City.

She first performed in New York in mid-1911, and later that year took a leading role in the musical comedy The Quaker Girl on Broadway before returning to vaudeville. She insisted on and gained top billing on a show at the Fifth Avenue Theatre, where she was described in Variety in 1912 as "one of the cleverest, classiest, and most attractive of turns". In 1913, she met local physician John Dillon Stewart in Indianapolis, Indiana, and they married that year in Kansas City. Stewart moved his practice to New York City to be near her primary base of operations.

Petrova returned to theatre performance in 1914, and was offered a film contract, appearing first in The Tigress, directed by Alice Guy-Blaché, and then in a succession of silent films through 1917. She disliked playing weak female characters and spending time idle when making films. She set up her own film company and wrote for a number of periodicals. She starred in a number of films for Solax Studios and Metro Pictures, where she was usually given the role of a femme fatale. During her seven years in film, Petrova appeared in more than two dozen films and wrote the script for several others. Most of her films are now lost, including what she considered her best pictures, those directed by Maurice Tourneur. The Library of Congress Silent Feature Film Database indicates three of her films survive: The Vampire (1915), Extravagance (1916) and The Waiting Soul (1918).

She was a skilled self-publicist and was described as "an extraordinarily strong and determined female", and as "highly eccentric". Both on stage and on screen, Petrova became noted for her insistence on portraying independent and free-thinking women with strong personalities. She said in 1918: "The only women I want to play are women who do things. I want to encourage women to do things – to take their rightful place in life." She also wrote that she preferred to play "the woman of today: a modern, quick-thinking, and wholly human woman".

She left the film industry in 1918, but continued to act in Broadway productions, including many performances at the prestigious Palace Theatre. During the 1920s, she wrote three plays in which she starred: Hurricane dealt with birth control and What Do We Know? with spiritualism, both controversial subjects. She toured the U.S. with a theater troupe, before returning to vaudeville successfully in 1923. She also interviewed a number of prominent film stars on paid assignment for Shadowland magazine, Motion Picture Magazine, and Photoplay Journal, including Marion Davies, Mary Pickford, Theda Bara, Alla Nazimova, Norma Talmadge, Charlie Chaplin, Douglas Fairbanks, Sr., and Rudolf Valentino.

== Later life and death ==
She made several visits to Saranac Lake, New York, at the height of her fame at the request of theatrical agent William Morris. In the summer of 1921, she turned the first shovel of earth for a housing project sponsored by the chamber of commerce at a lot on Lake Street donated by Walter Jenkins. The Petrova School and Petrova Avenue bear her name.

She retired to live in the south of France in the late 1920s. At the start of World War II, she returned to the U.S. and settled in Clearwater, Florida, with her second husband, Louis Willoughby. In 1942, she published her autobiography Butter with My Bread.

Olga Petrova died in 1977 in Clearwater, Florida, aged 93. She had no children.

She has a star on the Hollywood Walk of Fame.

== Publications ==
- The White Peacock: A Play in Three Acts (Boston: Four Seas Company, 1922)
- Hurricane: Four Episodes in the Story of a Life (Boston: Four Seas Company, 1924)
- What Do We Know?: A Drama in Three Acts (Boston: Four Seas Company, 1930)
- Butter with My Bread (New York: Bobbs-Merrill, 1942)

== Filmography ==
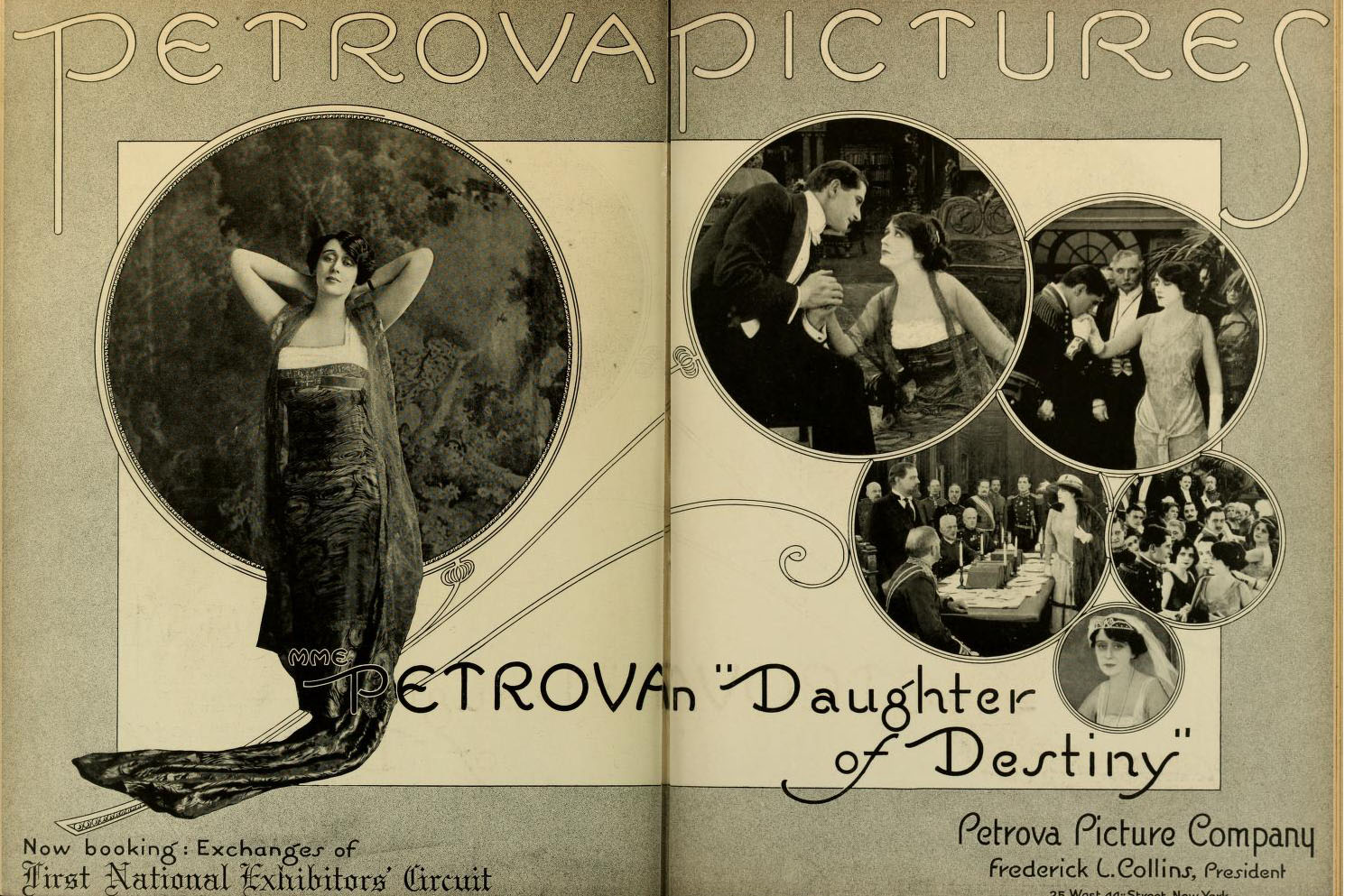
Daughter of Destiny (1917)

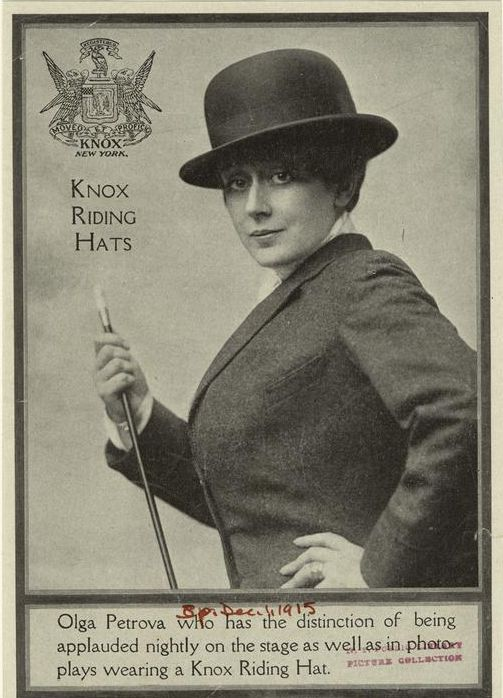
Olga Petrova presents a Knox Riding Hat, 1915

| Year | Title | Role | Notes |
|---|---|---|---|
| 1912 | Departure of a Grand Old Man | Sofia Tolstaya | Short |
| 1914 | The Tigress | Stella | Lost film |
| 1915 | The Heart of a Painted Woman | Martha Redmond | Lost film |
| 1915 | The Vampire | Jeanne Lefarge | |
| 1915 | The Bludgeon | | Incomplete film |
| 1915 | My Madonna | Lucille | Lost film |
| 1916 | What Will People Say? | Persis Cabot | Lost film |
| 1916 | The Soul Market | Elaine Elton | Lost film, credited as Olya Petrova |
| 1916 | Playing With Fire | Jean Serian | Lost film, credited as Mme. Petrova |
| 1916 | The Scarlet Woman | Thora Davis | Lost film, credited as Madame Petrova |
| 1916 | The Eternal Question | Bianca | Lost film |
| 1916 | Extravagance | Norma Russell | Credited as Mme. Olga Petrova |
| 1916 | The Black Butterfly | Sonia Smirnov/Marie, the convent girl | Lost film, credited as Mme. Petrova, also writer |
| 1917 | Bridges Burned | Mary O'Brien | Lost film, credited as Madame Petrova, also writer |
| 1917 | The Secret of Eve | Eve, in the Garden of Eden/ Hagar, the Gypsy Woman/ Eve, the Quakeress/ Eve, the Wife of Brandon | Lost film, credited as Mme. Olga Petrova |
| 1917 | The Waiting Soul | Grace Vaughan | Credited as Madame Olga Petrova |
| 1917 | The Soul of a Magdalen | Heloise Broulette | Lost film, credited as Mme. Petrova |
| 1917 | The Undying Flame | The Princess / Grace Leslie | Lost film, credited as Madame Olga Petrova |
| 1917 | Law of the Land | Margaret Harding | Lost film |
| 1917 | To the Death | Bianca Sylva | Lost film, credited as Mme. Olga Petrova, also writer |
| 1917 | The Silence Sellers | Laura Sutphen | Lost film, credited as Mme. Petrova |
| 1917 | Exile | Claudia Perez | Lost film, credited as Mme. Olga Petrova |
| 1917 | More Truth Than Poetry | Elaine Esmond/Vera Maitland | Lost film, credited as Mme. Olga Petrova, also writer |
| 1917 | Daughter of Destiny | Marion Ashley | Lost film, credited as Madame Olga Petrova, also writer and producer |
| 1918 | The Light Within | Laurel Carlisle, M. D. | Lost film, credited as Madame Olga Petrova |
| 1918 | The Life Mask | Anita Courtland | Lost film, credited as Madame Olga Petrova |
| 1918 | Tempered Steel | Lucille Caruthers | Lost film, credited as Madame Olga Petrova |
| 1918 | The Panther Woman | Patience Sparhawk | Lost film |
| 1928 | Kira Kiralina | Kira's Mother | Lost film |
