= List of people from Columbus, Georgia =

The following list includes notable people who were born or have lived in Columbus, Georgia.

== Arts and culture ==
Name	Image	Birth	Death	Known for	Association	Reference
Bo Bartlett		Dec 29, 1955		Realist painter	Born in Columbus	
Ricky Bartlett		Sep 27, 1972		Actor, singer, comedian, and television personality	Born in Columbus	
Megan Blake		Nov 8, 1958		Miss Georgia 1983	Born in Columbus	
Wayne Brady		Jun 2, 1972		Actor, singer, comedian, and television personality	Born in Columbus	
Davian Chester		May 27, 1993		Political cartoonist	Born in Columbus	
Juliette Compton		May 3, 1899	Mar 19, 1989	Actress	Born in Columbus	
Donna D'Errico		Mar 30, 1968		Actress and model; Playmate of the Month (September, 1995); Donna Marco on Baywatch (1996 to 1998)	Graduate of Pacelli High School in Columbus (1986)	
Marina Savashynskaya Dunbar		Jul 17, 1992		Painter	Lived in Columbus	
Justina Huff		Sep 8, 1893	Jun 29, 1977	Silent film actress (The Diamond Crown, Tess of the d'Urbervilles)	Born in Columbus	
Louise Huff		Nov 14, 1895	Aug 22, 1973	Silent film actress (Great Expectations, Mile-A-Minute Kendall, Disraeli)	Born in Columbus	
Nunnally Johnson		Dec 5, 1897	Mar 25, 1977	Academy Award-nominated filmmaker (The Grapes of Wrath, The Man in the Gray Flannel Suit)	Born in Columbus, graduated from Columbus High School (1915)	
Sherrilyn Kenyon		Dec 11, 1965		#1 New York Times and international bestselling author (Dark-Hunters, League, Chronicles of Nick, Lords of Avalon series)	Born in Columbus, attended Key Elementary School	
Carson McCullers		Feb 19, 1917	Sep 29, 1967	Writer (The Heart Is a Lonely Hunter, The Member of the Wedding, and The Ballad of the Sad Café)	Born in Columbus	
Robert Parrish		Jan 4, 1916	Dec 4, 1995	Academy Award- winning editor for Body and Soul (1947), directed Casino Royale (1967)	Born in Columbus	
George Foster Peabody		Jul 27, 1852	Mar 4, 1938	Banker and philanthropist; namesake of the Peabody Award	Born in Columbus	
James Rachels		May 30, 1941	Sep 5, 2003	Philosopher, focusing on ethics and animal rights	Born in Columbus	
Amy Sherald		Aug 30, 1973		Best known for her portrait of First Lady Michelle Obama	Born in Columbus	
Bob the Drag Queen (Caldwell Tidicue)		Jun 22, 1986		Drag queen and comedian, won season 8 of RuPaul's Drag Race	Born in Columbus, studied theater at Columbus State University	-
Mary Ann Williams		Aug 10, 1821	Apr 15, 1874	First to propose an annual holiday to decorate soldiers graves (Memorial Day)	Lived in Columbus	-

== Music ==
Name	Image	Birth	Death	Known for	Association	Reference
Robert M. Barr		1918	1988	Conductor of the Jordan High School Band in Columbus (1946–1963)	Lived in Columbus; chorus director in Fort Benning	
Jean Carn		Mar 15, 1947		Singer; vocalist credited with a five octave vocal range	Born in Columbus	
Robert Cray		Aug 1, 1953		Five-time Grammy Award-winning blues guitarist and singer	Born in Columbus	
Justin Guarini		Oct 28, 1978		Singer, songwriter, and actor; runner-up on American Idol season 1 (2002)	Born in Columbus	
Jake Hess		Dec 24, 1927	Jan 4, 2004	Grammy Award-winning southern gospel singer	Lived in Columbus	
Dmitri Matheny		Dec 25, 1965		Jazz flugelhornist, composer, educator, producer and recording artist	Grew up in Columbus	
Marilyn McCoo		Sep 30, 1943		Pop singer	Lived in Columbus for seven years	
Curley Money		Mar 20, 1925	Dec 23, 2003	Rockabilly musician and songwriter	Lived in Columbus	
Bebo Norman		May 29, 1973		Contemporary Christian musician	Lives in Columbus	
Ma Rainey		Apr 26, 1886	Dec 22, 1939	Among the earliest known professional blues singers; billed as The Mother of the Blues	Born in Columbus	
Herrman S. Saroni		Feb 1824	Dec 29, 1900	Author, composer and inventor credited with starting the Columbus Symphony Orchestra	Lived in Columbus	
Keni Thomas				Country music singer and United States Army Ranger	Lives in Columbus	
Rozonda Thomas (a.k.a. Chilli)		Feb 27, 1971		Singer-songwriter, actress and television personality; founding member of girl group TLC	Lives in Columbus	
Danny Whitten		May 8, 1943	Nov 18, 1972	Musician and songwriter, known for his work with Neil Young's band Crazy Horse	Born in Columbus	
Blind Tom Wiggins		May 25, 1849	Jun 14, 1908	African-American musical prodigy on the piano	Owned as a slave in Columbus	
Tim Wilson		Aug 5, 1961	Feb 26, 2014	Stand-up comedian and country music artist	Born and died in Columbus	

== Business ==
Name	Image	Birth	Death	Known for	Association	Reference
Claud A. Hatcher		Aug 20, 1876	Dec 31, 1933	Pharmacist; inventor of RC Cola beverages	Lived in Columbus	
Randolph Mott		Aug 9, 1799	Jul 20, 1881	Businessman, unionist	Lived in Columbus	
John Pemberton		Jul 8, 1831	Aug 16, 1888	Pharmacist; inventor of Coca-Cola	Lived in Columbus	
Robert W. Woodruff		Dec 6, 1889	Mar 7, 1985	President of The Coca-Cola Company (1923–1954)	Born in Columbus	

== Military ==
Name	Image	Birth	Death	Known for	Association	Reference
Henry L. Benning		Apr 2, 1814	Jul 10, 1875	Judge on the Georgia Supreme Court; Confederate Army general; namesake of Fort Benning	Born and died in Columbus	
Eugene Bullard		Oct 9, 1895	Oct 12, 1961	First African-American military pilot	Born in Columbus	
William Calley		Jun 8, 1943		United States Army officer convicted of ordering the My Lai Massacre	Lived in Columbus	

== Politics and activism ==
Name	Image	Birth	Death	Known for	Association	Reference
Bubba Copeland		May 27, 1974	Nov 3, 2023	Mayor of Smiths Station, Alabama (2016–2023)	Born in Columbus	
Newt Gingrich		Jun 17, 1943		58th speaker of the United States House of Representatives	Graduated from Baker High School in Columbus (1961)	
Petra Kelly		Nov 29, 1947	Oct 1, 1992	Founder of German Green Party	Graduated from Baker High School in Columbus (1966)	
Mirabeau B. Lamar		Aug 16, 1798	Dec 19, 1859	2nd president of the Republic of Texas	Lived in Columbus and founded the Columbus Enquirer newspaper	
Ted J. Land		Aug 22, 1936	Mar 31, 2018	Member of the Georgia State Senate 1979–1991	Represented Marion, Talbot, and portions of Muscogee counties	
Bobby G. Peters		Feb 21, 1949		Mayor of Columbus, Georgia 1995–2002	Lived in Columbus, graduated from Hardaway High School (1967); also a Superior Court judge	
Nikema Williams		Jul 30, 1978		U.S. representative for Georgia	Born in Columbus	

== Sports ==
=== Baseball ===
Name	Image	Birth	Death	Known for	Association	Reference
Reggie Abercrombie		Jul 15, 1981		Center fielder for Florida Marlins and Houston Astros	Born in Columbus	
Glenn Davis		Mar 28, 1961		Two-time All-Star first baseman for the Houston Astros, Baltimore Orioles, and Hanshin Tigers	Lives in Columbus; Columbus City Council member	
Tim Hudson		Jul 14, 1975		Four-time All-Star pitcher for the Oakland Athletics, Atlanta Braves, and San Francisco Giants	Born in Columbus	
Garey Ingram		Jul 25, 1970		Second baseman for the Los Angeles Dodgers	Born in Columbus	
Edwin Jackson		Sep 9, 1983		All-Star pitcher for MLB teams; World Series champion (2011)	Attended Shaw High School in Columbus	
Brian Mallette		Jan 19, 1975		Relief pitcher for the Milwaukee Brewers and Osaka Kintetsu Buffaloes	Attended Columbus State University	
Tony Pierce		Jan 29, 1946	Jan 31, 2013	Pitcher for the Kansas City/Oakland Athletics	Lived and died in Columbus; Attended Jordan High School in Columbus	
Colby Rasmus		Aug 11, 1986		Center fielder for the St. Louis Cardinals and Toronto Blue Jays	Born in Columbus	
Cory Rasmus		Nov 6, 1987		Pitcher for the Atlanta Braves and Los Angeles Angels of Anaheim	Born in Columbus	
Steven Register		May 16, 1983		Relief pitcher for the Colorado Rockies and Philadelphia Phillies	Born in Columbus	
Frank Thomas		May 27, 1968		2014 Hall of Fame Inductee – Five-time All-Star first baseman for the Chicago White Sox, Oakland Athletics, and Toronto Blue Jays; Two-time AL MVP (1993, 1994)	Born in Columbus	

=== Basketball ===
Name	Image	Birth	Death	Known for	Association	Reference
Sam Mitchell		Sep 2, 1963		NBA Coach of the Year Award (2007) for the Toronto Raptors; assistant coach for the Milwaukee Bucks, New Jersey Nets and Minnesota Timberwolves	Born in Columbus	

=== Bodybuilding ===
Name	Image	Birth	Death	Known for	Association	Reference
Lenda Murray		Feb 22, 1962		Bodybuilding champion		

=== Football ===
Name	Image	Birth	Death	Known for	Association	Reference
Derrius Brooks		May 29, 1988		Defensive back for multiple teams	Born in Columbus	
Brentson Buckner		Sep 30, 1971		Defensive tackle for the Pittsburgh Steelers, Cincinnati Bengals, San Francisco 49ers, and Carolina Panthers	Born in Columbus, graduated from G.W. Carver High School	
Isaiah Crowell		Jan 8, 1993		Running back for the Cleveland Browns	Born in Columbus, graduated from G.W. Carver High School	
Rod Hood		Oct 3, 1981		Cornerback for six NFL teams	Born in Columbus, graduated from G.W. Carver High School	
Chris Hubbard		Apr 23, 1991		Offensive guard for the Pittsburgh Steelers	Born in Columbus; graduated from G.W. Carver High School	
Chuck Hurston		Nov 9, 1942	Nov 3, 2015	Defensive end for the Super Bowl IV champion Kansas City Chiefs	Born in Columbus	
Jarvis Jones		Oct 13, 1989		Outside linebacker for the Pittsburgh Steelers	Graduated from G.W. Carver High School in Columbus	
Mark LeGree		Jul 8, 1989		Safety for seven NFL teams	Attended Pacelli High School in Columbus	
Kelcie McCray		Sep 21, 1988		Free safety for the Miami Dolphins, Tampa Bay Buccaneers, and Kansas City Chiefs	Born in Columbus	
Dell McGee		Sep 7, 1973		Run game coordinator & running backs coach for the Georgia Bulldogs	Born in Columbus	
DeQuan Menzie		Jan 11, 1990		Cornerback for the Kansas City Chiefs, Detroit Lions, and Carolina Panthers	Born in Columbus, graduated from G.W. Carver High School	
Nate Odomes		Aug 25, 1965		Cornerback for the Buffalo Bills, Seattle Seahawks, and Atlanta Falcons; 2× Pro Bowl (1992, 1993)	Born in Columbus, graduated from G.W. Carver High School	
Rayshun Reed		Apr 10, 1981		Defensive back for the San Francisco 49ers	Born in Columbus	
Steve Reese		Jan 7, 1952		Linebacker for the New York Jets, Tampa Bay Buccaneers	Born in Columbus	
Otis Sistrunk		Sep 18, 1946		Defensive end for the Oakland Raiders; Pro Bowl	Born in Columbus	
Mack Strong		Sep 11, 1971		Fullback for the Seattle Seahawks; 2× Pro Bowl (2005, 2006)	Attended Brookstone School in Columbus	
Cleo Walker		Feb 7, 1948		Linebacker for the Green Bay Packers and Atlanta Falcons	Born in Columbus	

=== Soccer ===
Name	Image	Birth	Death	Known for	Association	Reference
Josh Casarona		Apr 12, 1992		Defender	Born in Columbus	
Duane Holmes		Nov 6, 1994		Midfielder; United States international	Born in Columbus	
Marshall Leonard		Dec 29, 1980		Defender	Attended both Shaw High School and Brookstone School in Columbus	

=== Wrestling ===
Name	Image	Birth	Death	Known for	Association	Reference
Marty Jannetty		Feb 3, 1960		World Wrestling Federation wrestler; member of The Rockers tag team	Born in Columbus	
Xavier Woods		Sep 4, 1986		WWE wrestler		
