= Uriah Tracy =

American lawyer and politician from Connecticut (1755–1807)

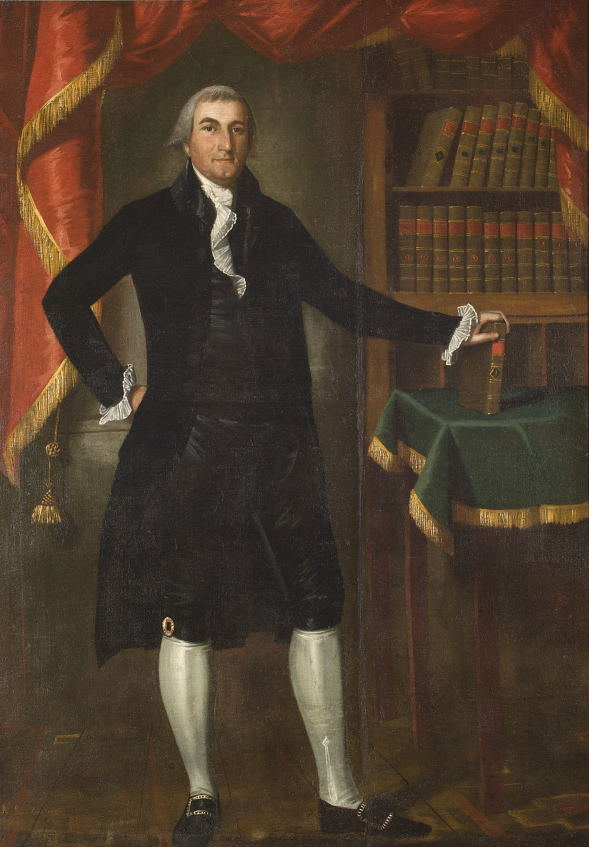

President pro tempore of the United States Senate
- In office May 14, 1800 – November 16, 1800
- Preceded by: Samuel Livermore
- Succeeded by: John E. Howard

United States Senator from Connecticut
- In office October 13, 1796 – July 19, 1807
- Preceded by: Jonathan Trumbull, Jr.
- Succeeded by: Chauncey Goodrich

Member of the U.S. House of Representatives from Connecticut's At-large congressional district
- In office April 8, 1793 – October 13, 1796
- Preceded by: Zephaniah Swift
- Succeeded by: Samuel W. Dana

Personal details
- Born: February 2, 1755 Franklin, Connecticut Colony, British America
- Died: July 19, 1807 (aged 52) Washington, D.C., U.S.
- Party: Federalist
- Education: Yale University
- Profession: Lawyer, Politician

Uriah Tracy (February 2, 1755 – July 19, 1807) was an American lawyer and politician from Connecticut. He served in the US House of Representatives (1793 to 1796) and the US Senate (1796 to 1807). From May to November 1800, Tracy served as President pro tempore of the United States Senate.

== Youth, family life and early career ==
Tracy was born in Franklin in the Connecticut Colony. In his youth, he received a liberal education. His name is listed among those in a company from Roxbury that responded to the Lexington Alarm at the beginning of the American Revolutionary War. He later served in the Roxbury Company as a clerk.

In 1778, Tracy graduated from Yale University, his contemporaries including Noah Webster. He was admitted to the bar in 1781 and then practiced law in Litchfield for many years.

Tracy had five children with Susannah Bull; Sally, Susan, Julia, George and Caroline. All five would survive to adulthood. His daughter Sally was married to jurist James Gould.

== Political career ==
He served in the state legislature in 1788 to 1793 and in the US House of Representatives from April 8, 1793 to October 13, 1796 after he had been chosen as a Federalist.

He resigned his seat when he was elected to the US Senate in place of Jonathan Trumbull Jr., who had resigned.

He has the distinction of being the first member of Congress to be interred in the Congressional Cemetery. His descendants include the mathematician Curtis Tracy McMullen and the author Jeanie Gould.

In 1803, he and several other New England politicians proposed secession of New England from the Union because of the growing influence of Jeffersonian Democrats that had been helped by the Louisiana Purchase, which they felt further diminished Northern influence.

=== Death and aftermath ===
Tracy died in Washington, D.C on July 19, 1807 at the age of 52, of a long illness which caused dropsy. He was buried at Congressional Cemetery in Washington, D.C.

On October 25, 1807, Chauncey Goodrich was elected by the Connecticut General Assembly to serve the remaining portion of Tracy's term.

== Legacy ==
His portrait, painted by Ralph Earl, is in the collection of the Litchfield Historical Society in Litchfield, Connecticut.

== See also ==
- List of members of the United States Congress who died in office (1790–1899)

U.S. Senate
Preceded by Jonathan Trumbull, Jr.	U.S. senator (Class 3) from Connecticut; 1796–1807; Served alongside: James Hillhouse	Succeeded by Chauncey Goodrich
U.S. House of Representatives
Preceded by Zephaniah Swift	Member of the U.S. House of Representatives from Connecticut's at-large congressional district April 8, 1793 – October 13, 1796	Succeeded by Samuel W. Dana
Political offices
Preceded by Samuel Livermore	President pro tempore of the United States Senate; May 14, 1800 – November 16, 1800	Succeeded by John E. Howard
