= Marjorie's Quest =

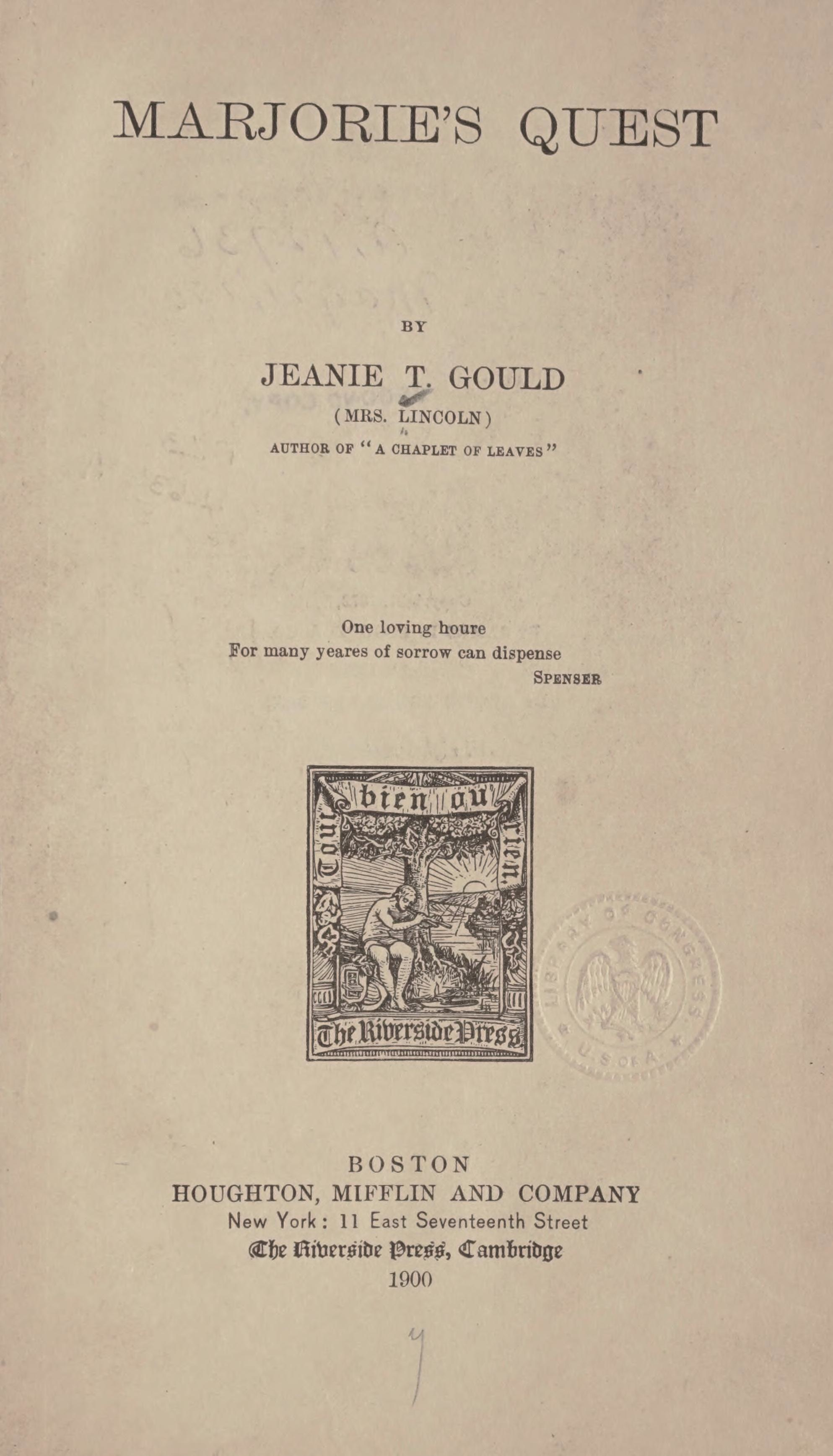
- Title page for Marjorie's Quest (1900 edition)
- Author: Jeanie Thomas Gould Lincoln
- Genre: Young Adult
- Publication date: 1872

Marjorie's Quest is a sentimental children's novel about an orphan girl by Jeanie Gould, first published in 1872.

The book inspired the Polish writer Henryk Sienkiewicz to write his children's book In Desert and Wilderness.

== Plot summary ==
The story takes place in the second part of the 1850s. At the beginning of the novel, recently orphaned ten-year-old Marjorie is on her way to stay with an unknown relative. She meets a nice and concerned Judge Gray, who believes the relative, a shiftless drunkard, to be unsuitable. He keeps the girl for a while at his place, where she befriends his teenage son, Reggie.

Marjorie is eventually sent to an orphanage, but does not stay there long, since a wealthy family adopts her. The parents have just lost their own little girl and dote on Marjorie, but their teenage son becomes highly jealous of his new sister. His unpleasant behaviour results in Marjorie having an accident, and consequently she loses her memory and goes missing. An old beggar finds her and looks after her. The beggar turns out to have selfish motives, though. When Marjorie recovers, she is taken out to beg by the beggar because people more willingly give money to children. One day, they meet a young woman who takes Marjorie from the beggar and adopts her.

Six years later, Marjorie goes to a Southern farm, where she is a teacher for two little children. There, she meets a young soldier.
