= Garrison's Finish =

1923 American film

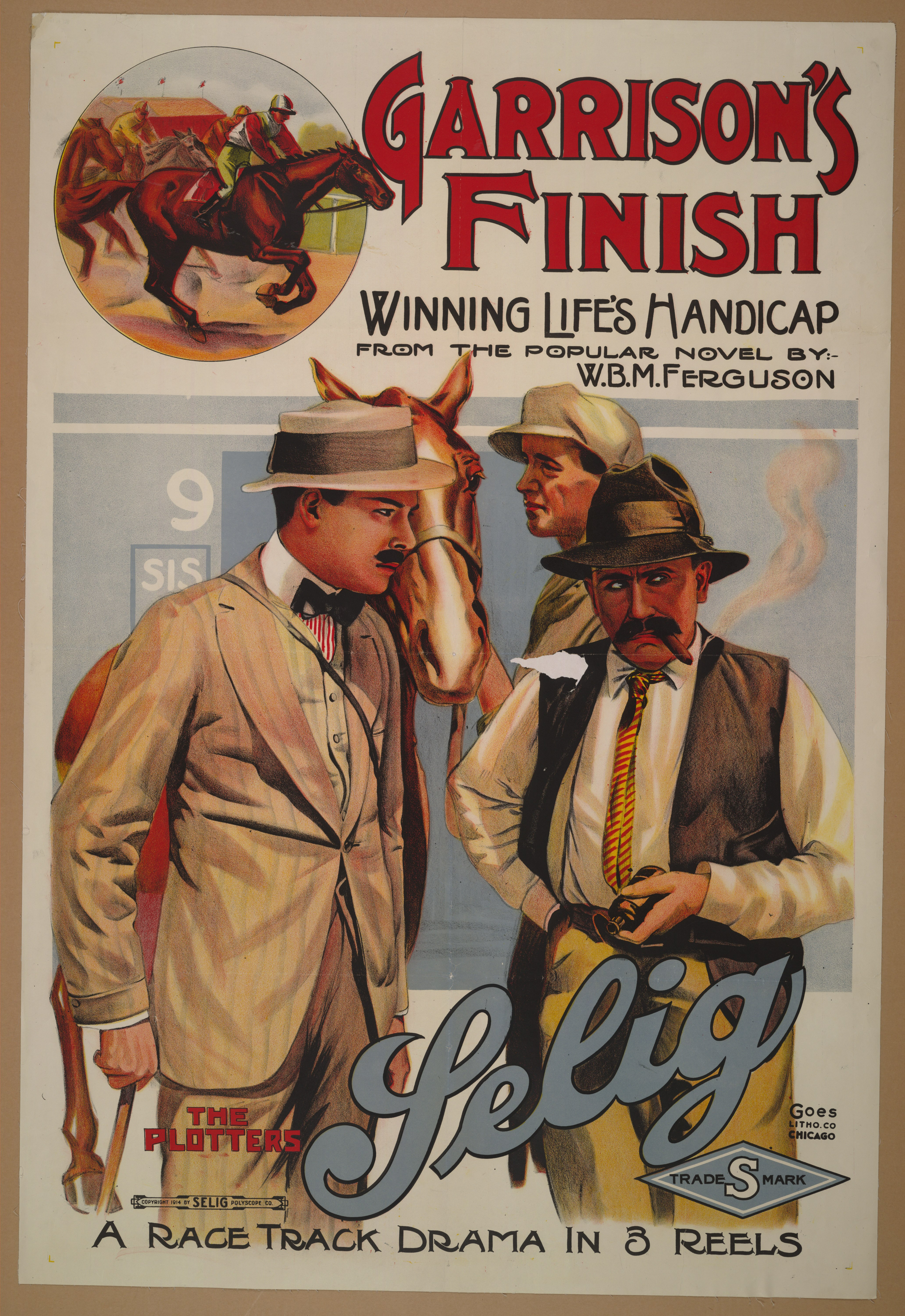
- Directed by: Arthur Rosson
- Written by: William Blair Morton Ferguson (novel); Elmer Harris; Mary Pickford
- Produced by: Jack Pickford
- Starring: Jack Pickford; Madge Bellamy; Clarence Burton
- Cinematography: Harold Rosson
- Production company: Jack Pickford Productions
- Distributed by: Allied Producers & Distributors Corporation
- Release date: January 15, 1923
- Running time: 80 minutes
- Country: United States
- Language: Silent (English intertitles)

Garrison's Finish is a 1923 American silent sports drama film directed by Arthur Rosson and starring Jack Pickford, Madge Bellamy and Clarence Burton.

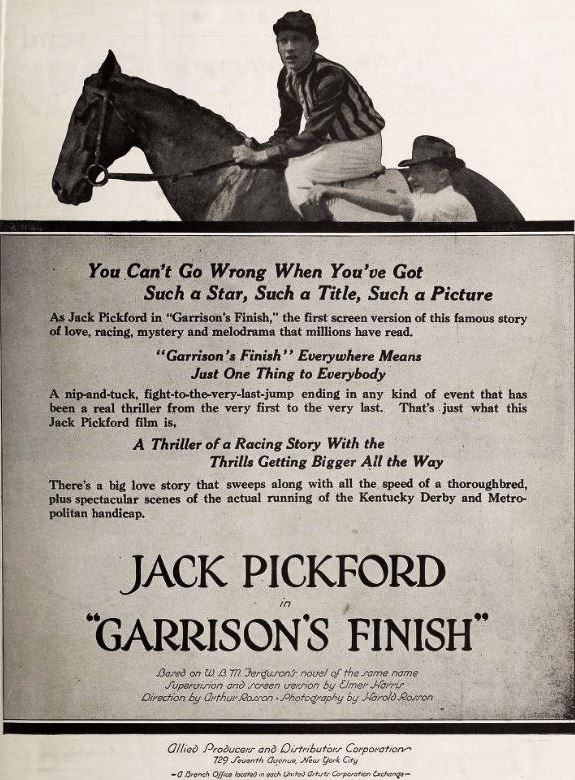
Magazine advertisement

== Cast ==
- Jack Pickford as Billy Garrison
- Madge Bellamy as Sue Desha
- Clarence Burton as Crimmins
- Charles A. Stevenson as Colonel Desha
- Charles Ogle as Colonel Desha's trainer
- Ethel Grey Terry as Lilly Allen
- Tom Guise as Major Desha
- Frank Elliott as Mr. Waterbury
- Audrey Chapman as Sue's friend
- Dorothy Manners as Sue's friend
- Herbert Prior as judge of race course
- Lydia Knott as Billy's mother

== Production ==
Garrison's Finish was partially shot on location at Belmont Park and used footage of the Metropolitan Handicap, and additional exteriors were taken at Churchill Downs of the Kentucky Derby.

== Preservation ==
A complete copy survives at the Gosfilmofond film archive in Russia.
