= The Man Inside (1916 film) =

1916 mystery film

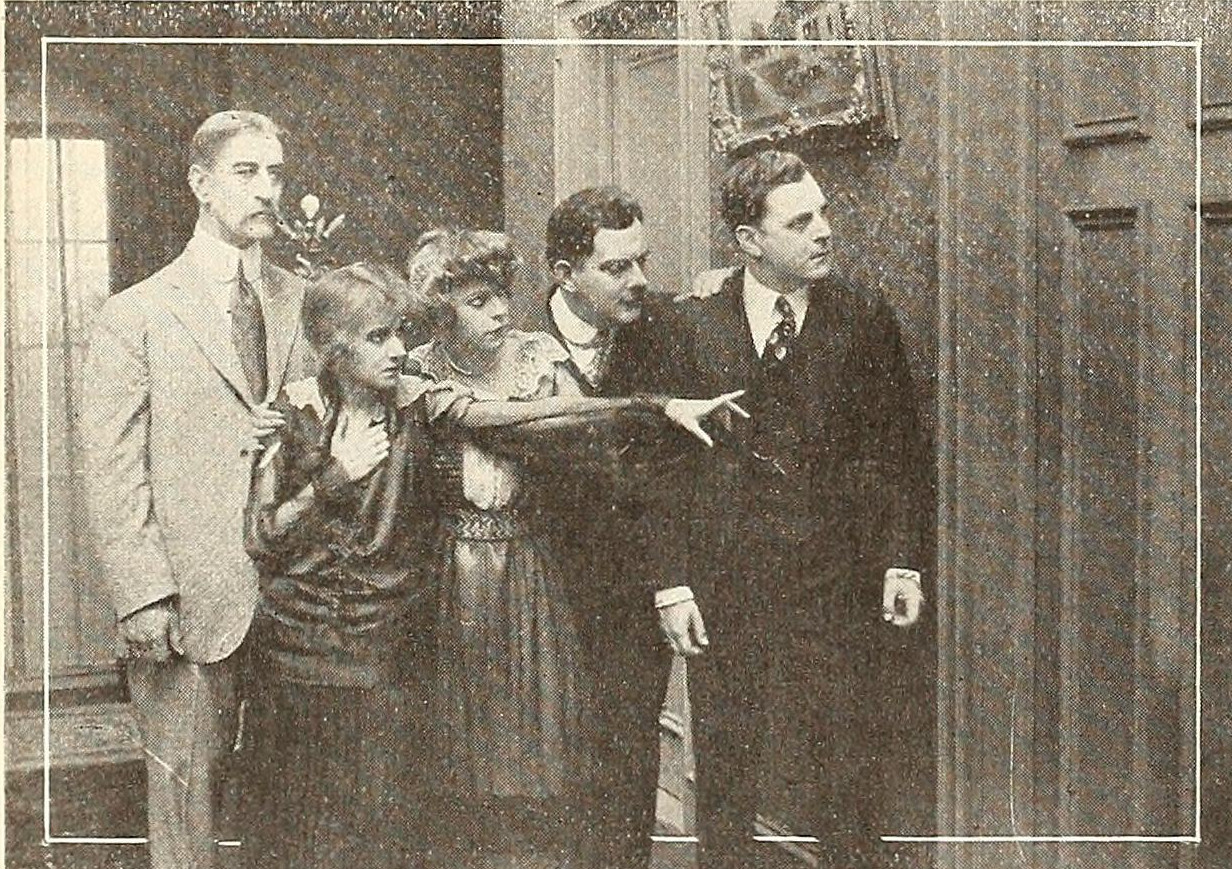
- The Cross on the Door
- Directed by: John G. Adolfi
- Written by: Natalie S. Lincoln (novel); Raymond L. Schrock
- Starring: Edwin Stevens; Tina Marshall; Charles Burbridge; Justina Huff
- Production company: Universal Film Manufacturing Company
- Distributed by: Universal Film Manufacturing Company
- Release date: January 17, 1916
- Country: United States
- Languages: Silent; English intertitles

The Man Inside is a 1916 American silent mystery film directed by John G. Adolfi and starring Edwin Stevens, Tina Marshall and Charles Burbridge. It was based on the novel by Natalie Sumner Lincoln.

== Cast ==
- Edwin Stevens as Barry / Dana Thornton
- Tina Marshall as Eleanor
- Charles Burbridge as Sen. Carew
- Justina Huff as Cynthia
- Billy Armstrong as Lt. Lane
- Sidney Bracey as Winthrop
- Harry Benham as Hunter
- Louis Leon Hall as Brett
- Gustave Thomas as Secretary of State
- Florence Crawford as Yvette Deplau

== Bibliography ==
- James Robert Parish & Michael R. Pitts. Film directors: a guide to their American films. Scarecrow Press, 1974.
