= Exit Smiling =

1926 film by Sam Taylor

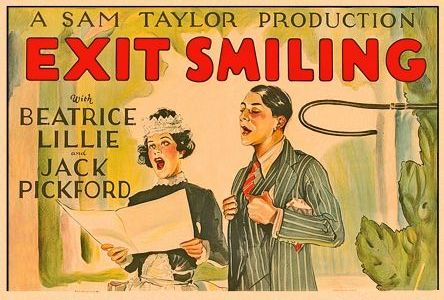
- Lobby card
- Directed by: Sam Taylor
- Written by: Tim Whelan and Sam Taylor
- Based on: Exit Smiling by Marc Connelly
- Produced by: Sam Taylor (uncredited)
- Starring: Beatrice Lillie; Jack Pickford
- Cinematography: André Barlatier
- Edited by: Daniel J. Gray
- Distributed by: Metro-Goldwyn-Mayer
- Release date: November 14, 1926
- Running time: 77 minutes
- Country: United States
- Language: Silent (English intertitles)

Exit Smiling (full film)

Exit Smiling is a 1926 American silent comedy film directed by Sam Taylor and starring New York and London revues star Beatrice Lillie in her first (and only silent) film role and Jack Pickford, the brother of star Mary Pickford. The film was also the debut of actor Franklin Pangborn. This film is available on DVD from the Warner Archives Collection.

== Plot ==
Violet, the travelling theatre troupe's worst actress, dreams of all she could be if she only had the right opportunities. Jimmy is a runaway bank clerk who joins the troupe as a juvenile lead actor.

== Cast ==
- Beatrice Lillie as Violet
- Jack Pickford as Jimmy Marsh
- Doris Lloyd as Olga
- DeWitt Jennings as Orlando Wainwright
- Harry Myers as Jesse Watson
- Tenen Holtz as Tod Powell
- Louise Lorraine as Phyllis Tichnor
- Franklin Pangborn as Cecil Lovelace
- D'Arcy Corrigan as Macomber (uncredited)
- Charles K. French as Mr. Tichnor (uncredited)
- Dwight Frye as Balcony Heckler (uncredited)
- William Gillespie as Jack Hastings (uncredited)
- Jimmy Humes as Audience Member (uncredited)
- Gus Leonard as Audience Member (uncredited)
- Andy MacLennan as Stagehand (uncredited)
- Kenneth McMillan as Audience Member (uncredited)
- Terence McMillan as Audience Member (uncredited)
- Carl Richards as Dave (uncredited)
- Carl 'Major' Roup as Young Boy in Audience (uncredited)
- Dorothea Wolbert as Anna (uncredited)
- Bert Woodruff as 1st Theatre Manager (uncredited)
