= Mabel Albertson =

American actress (1901–1982)

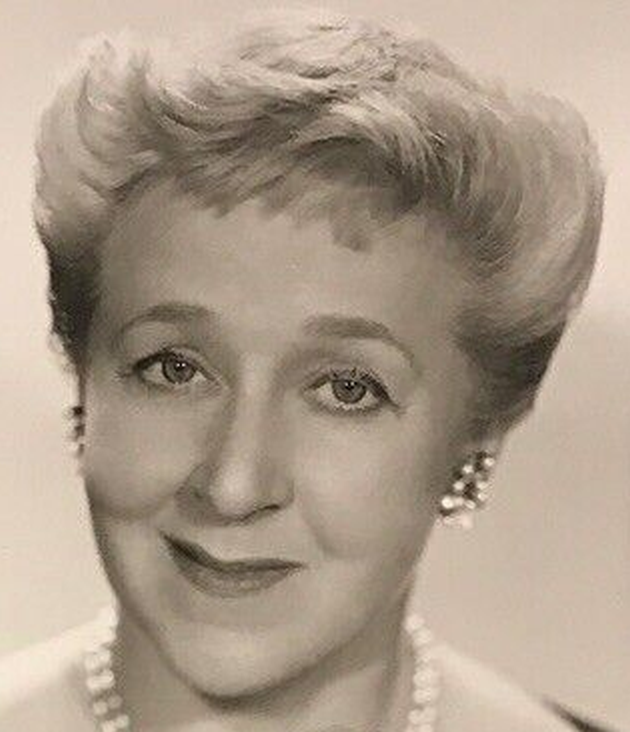
- Albertson in 1957
- Born: Mabel Ida Albertson; July 24, 1901; Haverhill, Massachusetts, U.S.
- Died: September 28, 1982 (aged 81); Santa Monica, California, U.S.
- Education: New England School of Speech and Expression
- Occupation: Actress
- Years active: 1928–1975
- Television: Bewitched (1964–1971)
- Spouses: Harold Austin Ripley (m. 1925; div. 1936) Ken Englund (m. 1937; sep. 1950)
- Children: 2, including George Englund
- Relatives: Jack Albertson (brother); Anabel Englund (great-granddaughter)

Mabel Ida Albertson (July 24, 1901 – September 28, 1982) was an American actress of television, stage, radio and film who portrayed Phyllis Stephens in the TV sitcom Bewitched. She also appeared in TV's The Time Tunnel (S1:E30, "Town of Terror").

== Early years ==
Mabel Ida Albertson was born on July 24, 1901, in Haverhill, Massachusetts, to Flora (Craft) and Leopold Albertson, Russian-born Jewish immigrants. Her younger brother was actor Jack Albertson, who portrayed Grandpa Joe in Willy Wonka & the Chocolate Factory. Their mother, a stock actress, supported the family by working in a shoe factory.

Albertson graduated from the New England School of Speech and Expression.

She traced her show business career back to age 13, when she was paid $5 per performance to play piano behind palm trees for a reader. She later moved to California and became involved with the Pasadena Playhouse.

She "moved directly into professional stage work in stock, vaudeville, and night clubs, appearing with Jimmy Durante."

== Career ==
=== Film and television ===
Albertson portrayed Phyllis Stephens, Darrin's neurotic, snippy and interfering mother, on the television sitcom Bewitched, who invariably ended her stays at the Stephenses' home by saying to her husband, "Frank, take me home. I have a sick headache." She also played the mother of Jack Benny (seven years her senior) on several episodes of his television series. From 1972 to 1973, she played Mabel, the mother-in-law of Paul Lynde on The Paul Lynde Show. She appeared in at least one episode of the courtroom drama series Perry Mason: as Carrie Wilson in the Season 6, 1962 episode titled "The Case of the Hateful Hero". Albertson also guest-starred as the mother of Marilyn Munster's would-be suitor in the first broadcast episode of The Munsters, "Munster Masquerade". Dragnet 1967 "The Big Bullet" Albertson played Jessie Gaynor, and she played the mother of Barbara and Margaret Whiting in Those Whiting Girls. She also played the dean of a women's college in an episode of The Tab Hunter Show, Susannah's mother in Accidental Family, Alice's mother in Bob & Carol & Ted & Alice, Donald Hollinger's mother on That Girl, Irene Brady in The Tom Ewell Show, Howard Sprague's mother on The Andy Griffith Show, Miss Ramsey on Hazel, Mrs. White on The Lucy Show episode "Lucy and the Missing Stamp", Eileen Ruby, Harry Ruby's wife, in Make Room For Daddy episode "Danny Goes On USO Tour", Dick Van Dyke's mother on The New Dick Van Dyke Show, and Ethel Kendricks on the Mary Tyler Moore Show episode "Anyone Who Hates Kids and Dogs", Gertrude Mills on The George Burns and Gracie Allen Show. Rawhide Season 2 Episode 24 as Kalla, Gypsy Queen. In the 1957 episode of Gunsmoke, "Cows and Cribs", she played Ma Smalley, a kindly boarding house owner. In the 1963 episode of Gunsmoke, "Kate Heller", she played the title character, as well as "Gody Baines" in a 1961 episode (Long, Long Trail). In 1966 she played Madam Adella in the Bonanza episode "A Dollar's Worth of Trouble". In Season 1 (1952/53) of Adventures of Superman, she played Kate White, Perry White's sister in the episode "Drums of Death" originally aired January 16, 1953. A memorable early film role for Albertson was as a proper banker's wife who is repulsed by the bucolic title characters in Ma and Pa Kettle at Waikiki (1955). She was also seen in She's Back on Broadway, So This Is Love, About Mrs. Leslie, Forever, Darling, The Long, Hot Summer, Don't Give Up the Ship, On a Clear Day You Can See Forever and as Mrs. Van Hoskins, a wealthy woman whose jewels are stolen, in the screwball comedy film What's Up, Doc? (1972).

=== Other works ===
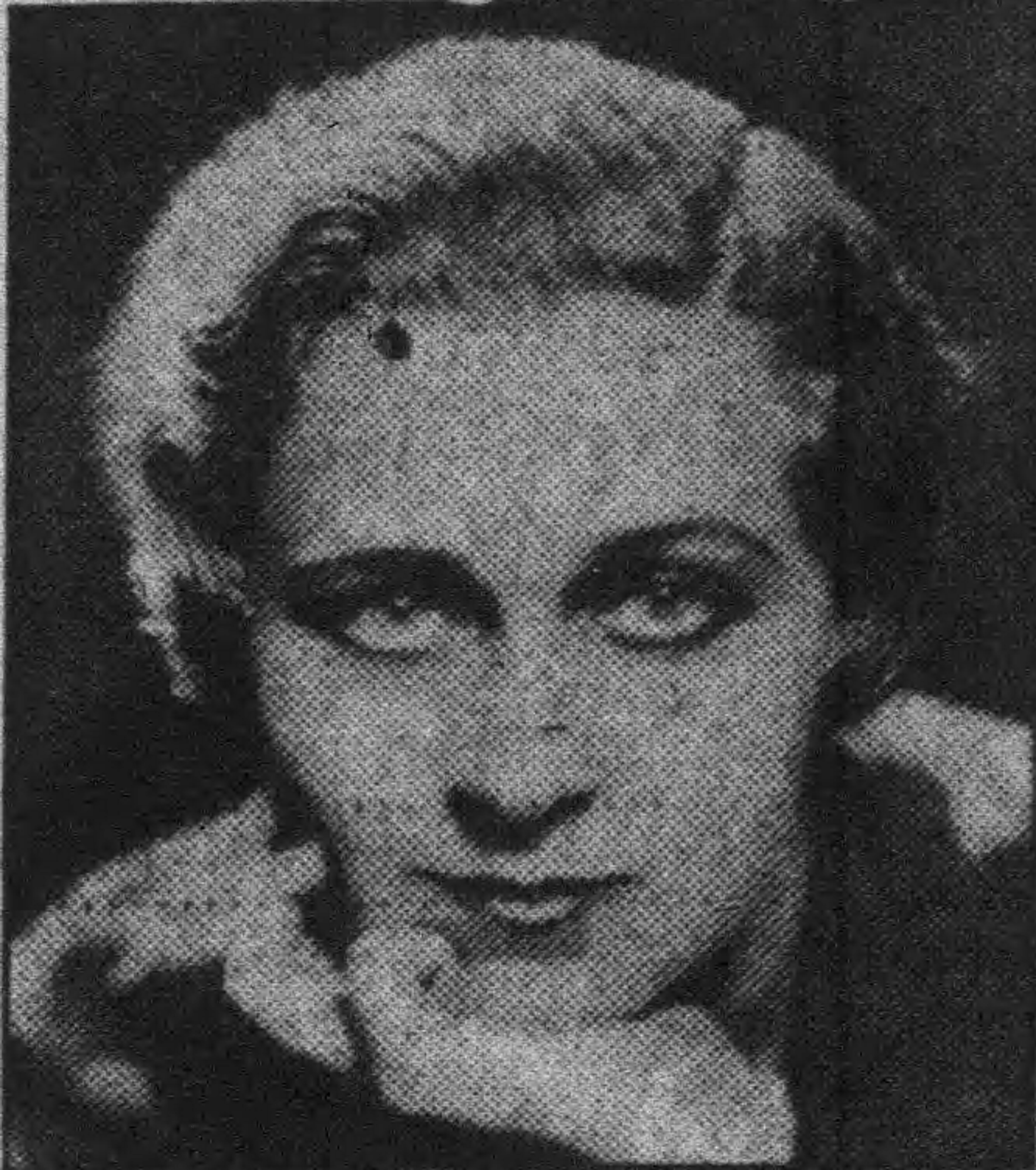
Albertson in 1933

Albertson was heard on Dress Rehearsal, Joe Rines' Dress Rehearsal, and the Phil Baker Show. She was also a writer for radio programs. Albertson's Broadway credits include The Egg (1962) and Xmas in Las Vegas (1965).

== Death ==
According to her former daughter-in-law, Cloris Leachman, Mabel Albertson died on September 28, 1982, of Alzheimer's disease at St. John's Hospital, after suffering seven years of poor health in Santa Monica, California at age 81. Her ashes were scattered into the Pacific Ocean. Her brother, Jack Albertson had been working and became a well-known actor in Hollywood until he died a few months prior to her death after succumbing to colon cancer.

== Filmography ==
Year	Title	Role	Notes
1928	Gang War	Reporter in the Prologue	
1939	Mutiny on the Blackhawk	The Widow	
1952	About Face	Mrs. Carter	Uncredited
1952	My Pal Gus	Mrs. Frisbee	Uncredited
1953	Adventures of Superman	Kate White	Season 1 - Episode 18 - Drums of Death
1953	She's Back on Broadway	Velma Trumbull	
1953	So This Is Love	Mary Garden	
1954	About Mrs. Leslie	Mrs. Sims	
1954	Black Widow	Sylvia	Uncredited
1955	Ma and Pa Kettle at Waikiki	Teresa Andrews	
1955	The Cobweb	Regina Mitchell-Smyth	
1956	Ransom!	Mrs. Partridge	
1956	Forever, Darling	Society Reporter	
1957	Four Girls in Town	Mrs. Conway	
1957	Man Afraid	Maggie	
1958	The Female Animal	Irma Jones	
1958	The Long, Hot Summer	Elizabeth Stewart	
1958	Home Before Dark	Inez Winthrop	
1959	The Hangman	Amy Hopkins	
1959	Don't Give Up the Ship	Mrs. Trabert	
1959	The Gazebo	Miss Chandler	
1959	Have Gun Will Travel	Madame Chalon	
1960	All the Fine Young Cannibals	Mrs. McDowall	
1961	All in a Night's Work	Mrs. Kingsley Sr.	
1962	Period of Adjustment	Mrs. Alice McGill	
1966	A Fine Madness	Chairwoman	
1967	Daniel Boone	Mrs. Abigail Adam’s	Episode: “Take the Southbound Stage”
1967	Barefoot in the Park	Harriet	
1970	On a Clear Day You Can See Forever	Mrs. Hatch	
1972	What's Up, Doc?	Mrs. Van Hoskins	
