= Jack Pickford =

Canadian-American actor (1896–1933)

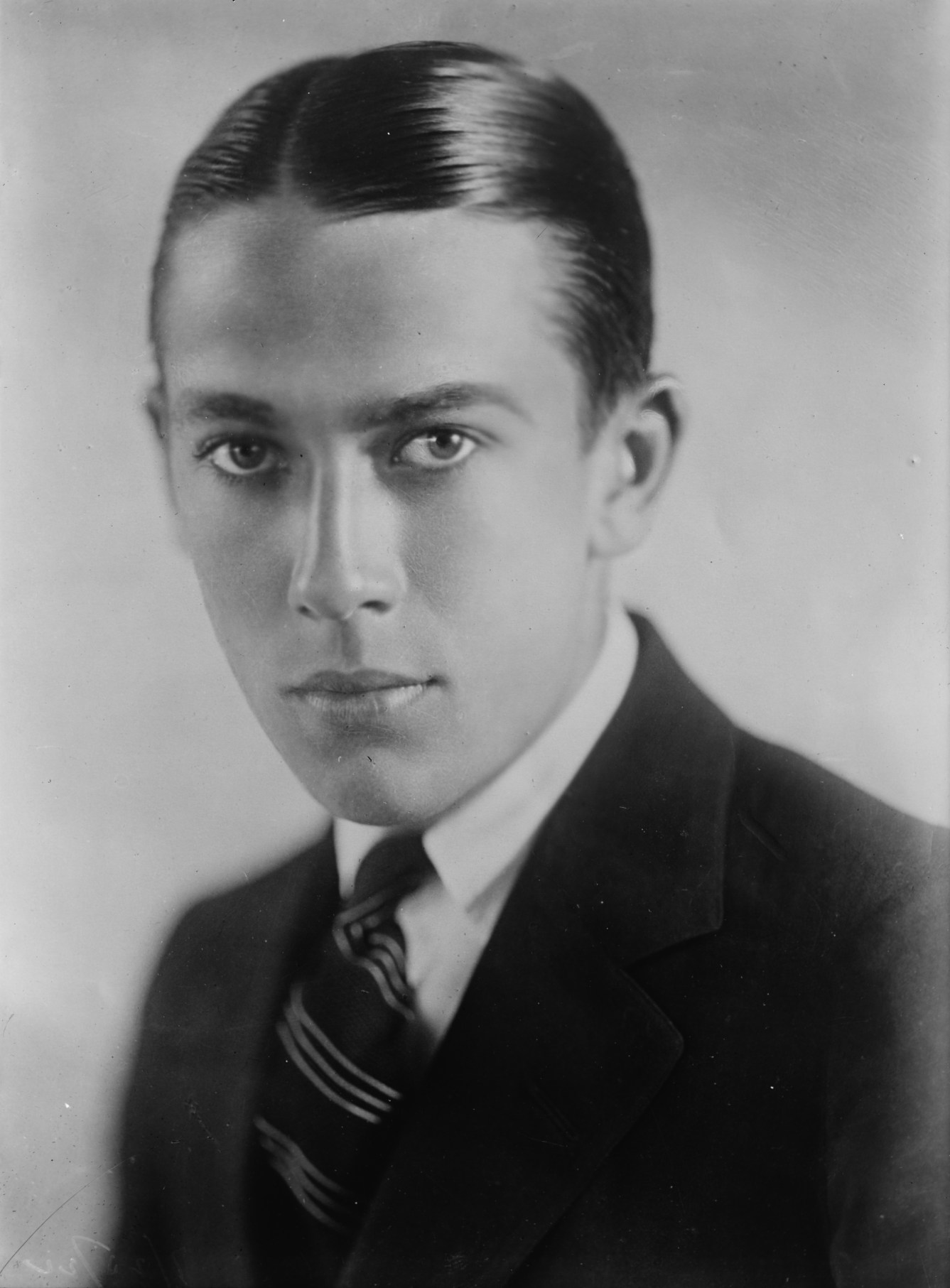
- Pickford, c. 1916
- Born: John Charles Smith; August 18, 1896; Toronto, Ontario, Canada
- Died: January 3, 1933 (aged 36); Neuilly-sur-Seine, France
- Resting place: Forest Lawn Memorial Park (Glendale)
- Occupations: Actor, director, producer
- Years active: 1909–1928
- Spouses: Olive Thomas (m. 1916; died 1920); Marilyn Miller (m. 1922; div. 1927); Mary Mulhern (m. 1930)
- Parent(s): Charlotte Hennessy; John Charles Smith
- Relatives: Mary Pickford (sister); Lottie Pickford (sister)

John Charles Smith (August 18, 1896 – January 3, 1933), known professionally as Jack Pickford, was a Canadian-American actor, film director, and producer. He was the younger brother of actresses Mary and Lottie Pickford.

After their father died, all three Pickford children began working as child actors on the stage. Mary later became a highly popular silent film actress, producer, and early Hollywood pioneer. While Jack appeared in numerous films as the "All American boy next door" and was a fairly popular performer, he was overshadowed by his sister's success. His career declined steadily due to alcohol, drugs, and chronic depression.

== Early life ==
John Charles Smith, known as "Jack", was born in 1896 in Toronto, Ontario, to John Charles Smith, an English immigrant odd-job man of Methodist background, and Charlotte Hennessy Smith, who was Irish Catholic. His alcoholic father died in 1898, leaving the family impoverished. The children were dispersed, all living in separate households as their mother was grief-stricken and unable to support them. However, Jack soon became very ill. The news of his illness revitalized their mother, Charlotte, and the family was reunited.

Out of desperation, Charlotte allowed Jack and his two sisters Gladys and Lottie to appear onstage, beginning with Gladys, the eldest. This move proved a good source of income and by 1900, the family had relocated to New York City, and the children were acting in plays across the United States. Most notably, young Jack appeared onstage in Peg Robin and The Three of Us. Jack received his education in public schools and later attended St. Francis Military Academy, in New York.

Due to work, the family was constantly separated until 1910 when Gladys signed with Biograph Studios, led by director D. W. Griffith. By this time, Gladys Smith had been transformed into Mary Pickford. (Marie was her middle name, and Pickford was an old family name.) Following suit, the Smiths changed their stage names to "Pickford."

Soon after signing with Biograph, Mary secured jobs for all the family, including the then 14-year-old Jack. In early January 1910, when the Biograph Company headed west to Los Angeles, California, only Mary was meant to go until Jack pleaded to join the company as well. Much to Mary's protest, Charlotte threw him on the train as it left the station. When the company arrived in Hollywood, Jack acted in bit parts and as a stunt double for young actresses, earning his way and supporting Mary. They both returned to New York months later, in April 1910.

The Pickford family briefly signed to the Independent Motion Picture Company (IMP) and the company moved to Havana, Cuba. However, the family eventually left and returned to the United States, re-signing with Biograph. Jack had a leading role in the short A Dash Through the Clouds (1912), but the Pickford family conclusively left Biograph in late 1912.

In 1912, Adolph Zukor formed Famous Players in Famous Plays, later known as Famous Players–Lasky and then Paramount Pictures, one of the first American feature film companies. Mary signed with Famous Players, and included the family. Mary soon became a well-known star, and by 1919 had signed a contract for $1 million with First National Pictures. As part of her contract, Mary saw to it that her family was brought along, giving Jack Pickford a lucrative contract with the company, as well.

== Acting career ==
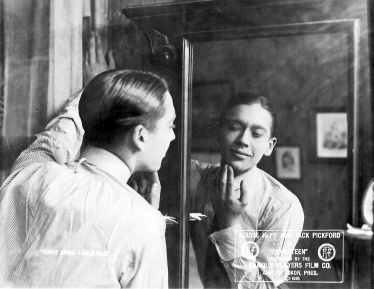
Pickford in Robert G. Vignola's Seventeen (1916)

By the time he signed with First National, Pickford had played bit parts in 95 shorts and full-length feature films. Although Pickford was considered an excellent actor, he is largely viewed as having failed to live up to his potential.

Pickford appeared in a large number of short films prior to the mid-1910s, when his sister Mary was at the pinnacle of her fame. The two siblings feature together in A Girl of Yesterday (1915) and Poor Little Peppina (1916) under Famous Players. However, Fanchon, the Cricket (1915) was one of the only films in which all three Pickford siblings appear. It was thought lost until rediscovered in the 20th century at the British Film Institute.

Famous Players–Lasky president Adolph Zukor gave Pickford his first lead performance debut in the film Seventeen (1916), an adaptation of Booth Tarkington's novel. It was described as "screamingly funny". In 1917, he starred in one of his first major roles as Pip in the adaptation of Charles Dickens' Great Expectations. After gaining critical success from these two productions, Pickford was then cast as the lead in The Dummy (1917), adapted from the 1914 play by Harriet Ford and Harvey J. O'Higgins, which proved extremely popular. It was a critical success and Pickford's first breakthrough performance.

Later in 1917, Pickford secured the title role in Mark Twain's Tom Sawyer and the follow-up Huck and Tom (1918). Tom Sawyer (1917) was considered one of Pickford's most successful film roles, as the title character resembled Pickford's on and off-screen persona. In a letter, on the completion of the production, he wrote: "I've always been fond of Mark Twain's writings, and Tom has long been a favorite of mine—somehow we seem to have a great deal in common. He performed so many of the very stunts that I remember in my own boyhood." In the early years of his career, Pickford became known for his clever portrayal of various boy parts in American novels.

Pickford was regularly teamed onscreen with actress Louise Huff. They both appeared in Seventeen (1916), Great Expectations (1917), Freckles (1917), What Money Can't Buy (1917), The Varmint (1917), The Ghost House (1917), Jack and Jill (1917), His Majesty, Bunker Bean (1918), Mile-a-Minute Kendall (1918), and Sandy (1918) under Paramount Pictures.

In early 1918, after the United States entered World War I, Pickford voluntarily joined the U.S. Navy as an enlisted sailor and was stationed at the Third Naval District in Manhattan, New York. Despite nearly being dishonorably discharged, Pickford was granted an honorable discharge in May 1919. In August 1920, he officially became a citizen of the United States and legally changed his surname from Smith to Pickford.

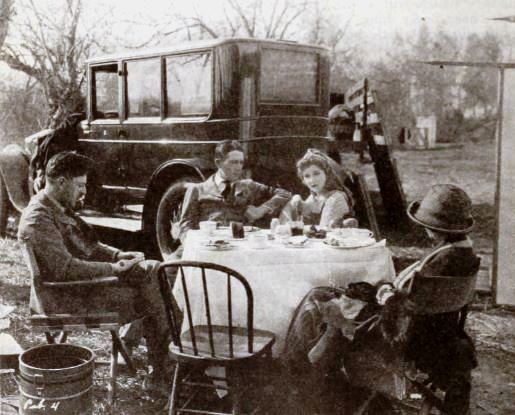
Through the Back Door (1921) with director Alfred E. Green, assistant director Jack Pickford, Mary Pickford, and continuity writer Marion Jackson

After the war in 1919, Pickford formed his own production company named the Jack Pickford Film Company, in partnership with First National Pictures. For a brief period, he produced and starred in his own films such as Bill Apperson's Boy (1919), Burglar by Proxy (1919), and In Wrong (1919). James Kirkwood directed Pickford during this time, in hope of boosting the actor's career.

In 1920, he signed with Goldwyn Pictures and starred in The Little Shepherd of Kingdom Come (1920), an adaptation of John Fox Jr.'s novel. Pickford became "bitterly disappointed" in the writing quality and directorial style of the film. He was determined to buy back the rights, with the intention of a future remake. A Double-Eyed Deceiver (1920), The Man Who Had Everything (1920), and Just Out of College (1920) followed and were all directed by Alfred E. Green, starring Pickford as the lead. However, Goldwyn and Pickford had creative differences and parted ways.

Pickford also dabbled in screenwriting and directing. In 1921, he co-directed Little Lord Faunteroy (1921) and Through the Back Door (1921) with Alfred E. Green, under United Artists, both films starring his sister Mary. Pickford was hired as the director in an attempt to rid him of his depression after the passing of his wife Olive Thomas a year prior. This was seen as an opportunity to give his career a new direction. In 1921, there were plans afoot for A Tailor-Made Man (1922) to be directed by Alfred E. Green and starring Pickford, under United Artists. But for reasons unknown, changes were made and Mary sold the film to Charles Ray.

By 1923, his roles had gone from several a year to one. After dedicating the last two years to directorial work, Pickford returned to acting in Garrison's Finish (1923). While Pickford's career did slow down after Thomas' death, the roles he played showed a new maturity and were some of the best of his career. These included The Hill Billy (1924), The Goose Woman (1925), Brown of Harvard (1926), and Exit Smiling (1926). In 1926, he played Brooks Bailey in The Bat (1926), directed by Roland West. Years later, West made a sound version titled The Bat Whispers (1930).

In 1928, he finished his last film, acting as Clyde Baxter in Gang War (1928) – a confirmed part-talkie. It was best known for being the main feature attached to Steamboat Willie, the debut of Mickey Mouse in sound.

Most of his films, especially those in the late 1910s, were both commercial and critical successes, making a highly regarded name for himself. Pickford's image was that of the All-American boy, with his sister being "America's Sweetheart". In all, Pickford appeared in more than 130 films between 1908 and 1928. The majority of these silent films remain lost, unknown to the general public. However, a few of his films have been made available on DVD.

== Personal life ==
Pickford was good friends with James Kirkwood and Bobby Harron, originating from their Biograph days. They all appeared in Home, Sweet Home (1914).

Pickford had an interest in automobiles. His sister Mary's first major extravagance was a car, a Stanley Steamer EMF, and Jack nicknamed it the "Even Mama Fell" and "Every Morning Fix it". He was filmed once driving a Citroën in Hollywood, a rival of Henry Ford.

=== Marriages ===
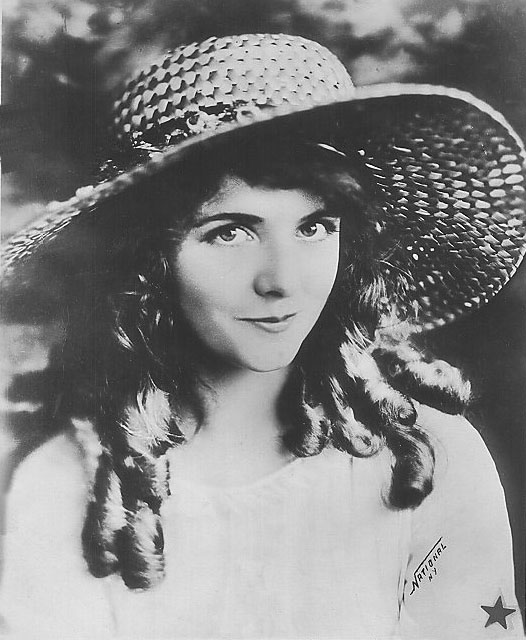
Olive Thomas, c. 1920

Pickford met actress and Ziegfeld girl Olive Thomas at a beach cafe on the Santa Monica Pier. Screenwriter and director Frances Marion later commented on the couple's lifestyle:

...I had seen her [Thomas] often at the Pickford home, for she was engaged to Mary's brother, Jack. Two innocent-looking children, they were the gayest, wildest brats who ever stirred the stardust on Broadway. Both were talented, but they were much more interested in playing the roulette of life than in concentrating on their careers.

Pickford and Thomas eloped on October 25, 1916, in New Jersey. None of their family was present and their only witness was Thomas Meighan. The couple had no children of their own, though in 1920, they adopted Olive's then-six-year-old nephew when his mother died. Although by most accounts Olive was the love of Pickford's life, the marriage was stormy and filled with highly charged conflict, followed by lavish making up through the exchange of expensive gifts. For many years, the Pickfords had intended to vacation together, and with their marriage on the rocks, the couple decided to take a second honeymoon.

In August 1920, the pair travelled to Paris, hoping to combine a vacation with some film preparations. On the night of September 5, 1920, the couple went out for a night of entertainment and partying at the famous bistros in the Montparnasse quarter of Paris. They returned to their room in the Hôtel Ritz around 3:00 a.m. It was rumored that Thomas may have taken cocaine that night, though it was never proven. She was intoxicated and tired, and took a large dose of mercury bichloride, a caustic medication, applied externally to treat syphilis (which Jack had). She was taken to the American Hospital in the Paris suburb of Neuilly, where Pickford, together with his former brother-in-law Owen Moore, remained at her side until she died from the poison a few days later. Rumors arose that she had either tried to die by suicide or had been murdered. A police investigation followed, as well as an autopsy, and Thomas's death was ruled accidental.

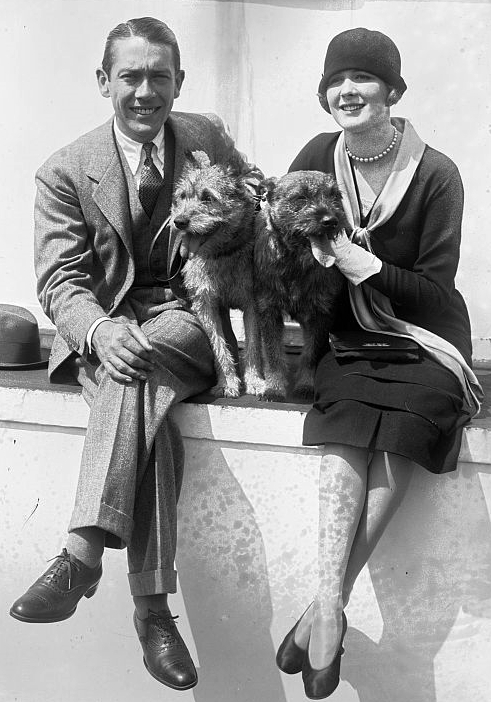
Jack Pickford and Marilyn Miller, c. 1924

Pickford married two more times. On July 31, 1922, he married Marilyn Miller (1898–1936), a celebrated Broadway dancer and former Ziegfeld girl, at his sister and brother-in-law's famed home Pickfair. By most accounts it was an abusive marriage due to Pickford's drug abuse and alcoholism. They separated in 1926 and Miller was granted a French divorce in November 1927.

Pickford's final marriage was to Mary Mulhern, aged 22 and a former Ziegfeld girl, whom he married on August 12, 1930. Within three months Pickford grew increasingly volatile towards Mulhern. After two years, Mulhern left Pickford, claiming he had mistreated her throughout the marriage. She was granted an interlocutory divorce in February 1932, which had yet to be finalized at the time of Pickford's death.

== Death and legacy ==
In 1932, Pickford visited his sister Mary at Pickfair. According to Mary, he looked ill and emaciated; his clothes were hanging on him as if he were a clothes hanger. Mary Pickford recalled in her autobiography that she felt a wave of premonition when watching her brother leave. As they started down the stairs to the automobile entrance, Jack called back to her, "Don't come down with me, Mary dear, I can go alone." Mary later wrote that as she stood at the top of the staircase, an inner voice said "That's the last time you'll see Jack".

Jack Pickford, at age 36, died at the American Hospital of Paris on January 3, 1933. The cause for his death was listed as "progressive multiple neuritis which attacked all the nerve centers". This was believed due to his alcoholism. "I have lived more than most men, and I am tired — so tired!" These were the last words whispered by Jack on his deathbed. Mary Pickford arranged for his body to be returned to Los Angeles, where he was interred in the private Pickford plot at Forest Lawn Memorial Park, Glendale.

For his contribution to the motion picture industry, Jack Pickford has a star on the Hollywood Walk of Fame at 1523 Vine Street.

=== Pickford siblings ===
Pickford and his sister Lottie were both silent film actors in their own right, but of course, were often overshadowed by their older sister, Mary. Living in her shadow, the two younger siblings embraced the happy-go-lucky times and fast living of the 1920s. Oddly enough, they both starred in Mile-a-Minute Kendall (1918) as lovers. Lottie was left heartbroken after Jack's untimely death in early 1933. According to Mary: "She [Lottie] was never the same after Jack's going. They were so very close in temperament and even in looks. It was as though with my brother's passing the better part of her had died too".

== Selected filmography ==
Year	Title	Role	Notes
1909	His Duty	One of the Children on the Street	Lost film
1909	The Message	In Crowd	Lost film
1909	Pranks	One of the Boys	Lost film
1909	Wanted, a Child	A Child	Lost film
1909	In a Hempen Bag	In Crowd	Lost film
1909	To Save Her Soul	A Stagehand	
1910	All on Account of the Milk	At Construction Site	
1910	The Call	At Show	
1910	The Newlyweds	At Station Reception	
1910	The Smoker	The Boy	
1910	The Kid	Walter Holden's Son	
1910	The Tenderfoot's Triumph	The Boy	
1910	An Affair of Hearts	A Boy	
1910	Ramona	A Boy	
1910	The Modern Prodigal	The Sheriff's Son	
1910	Muggsy Becomes a Hero	Mabel's Brother	
1910	In Life's Cycle		
1910	The Oath and the Man	The Messenger	
1910	Rose o' Salem Town	Indian	
1910	Examination Day at School	Student	
1910	The Iconoclast	In Office	
1910	The Broken Doll	Indian	
1910	Two Little Waifs	Boy on Road	
1911	His Trust Fulfilled	Black messenger	
1911	Sweet Memories	Young Earl Jackson	
1911	The Stuff Heroes Are Made Of		
1912	A Temporary Truce	An Indian	
1912	A Dash Through the Clouds	Mexican boy who warns Chubby	
1912	Man's Lust for Gold	Among the Indians	Lost film
1912	The Inner Circle	The Messenger	
1912	A Feud in the Kentucky Hills	A Brother	
1912	The Painted Lady	Beau at Ice Cream Festival	
1912	The School Teacher and the Waif	School boy	
1912	The Musketeers of Pig Alley	Rival Gang Member/At Dance	
1912	Heredity	Son of White Renegade Father and Indian Mother	Lost film
1912	My Baby	Wedding Guest	
1912	The Informer	Black Boy	
1912	Brutality	At Theatre	Incomplete film
1912	The New York Hat	Youth outside church	
1912	My Hero	Indian	Unconfirmed; Lost film
1913	A Misappropriated Turkey	On Street	Lost film
1913	Love in an Apartment Hotel	A Bellhop	Lost film
1913	The Unwelcome Guest	One of the Children	Alternative title: An Unwelcome Guest
1914	The Gangsters of New York	Spot, the spy	Alternative title: The Gangsters
1914	Home, Sweet Home	The Mother's Son	
1914	His Last Dollar	Jockey Jones	Lost film
1914	Wildflower	Bud Haskins	Lost film
1915	The Love Route	Billy Ball	Lost film
1915	Fanchon, the Cricket	The unnamed bully	
1915	The Pretty Sister of Jose	Jose	Lost film
1915	A Girl of Yesterday	John Stuart	Lost film
1916	Poor Little Peppina	Beppo	Alternative title: Little Peppina
1916	Seventeen	William Sylvanus Baxter	Lost film
1917	Great Expectations	Pip	Lost film
1917	Cupid's Touchdown	Henry Blondy Burton	Lost film
1917	The Dummy	Barney Cook	Lost film
1917	The Girl at Home	Jimmie Dexter	
1917	Freckles	Freckles	Lost film
1917	What Money Can't Buy	Dick Hale	Lost film
1917	The Varmint	John Humperdink Stover	Lost film
1917	The Ghost House	Ted Rawson	Lost film
1917	Jack and Jill	Jack Ranney	Lost film
1917	Tom Sawyer	Tom Sawyer	
1918	The Spirit of '17	Davy Glidden	Lost film
1918	Huck and Tom	Tom Sawyer	
1918	His Majesty, Bunker Bean	Bunker Bean	Lost film
1918	Mile-a-Minute Kendall	Kendall	Lost film
1918	Sandy	Sandy Kilday	Lost film
1919	Bill Apperson's Boy	Buddy Apperson	
1919	Burglar by Proxy	Jack Robin	
1919	In Wrong	Johnny Spivins	
1920	The Little Shepherd of Kingdom Come	Chad	Lost film
1920	A Double-Dyed Deceiver	the Llano Kid	Lost film
1920	The Man Who Had Everything	Harry Bullway	
1920	Just Out of College	Ed Swinger	Lost film
1923	Garrison's Finish	Billy Garrison	
1923	Hollywood	Himself	Cameo appearance Lost film
1924	The Hill Billy	Jed McCoy	Alternative title: The Hillbilly; Lost film
1925	Waking Up the Town	Jack Joyce	
1925	My Son	Tony	Lost film
1925	The Goose Woman	Gerald Holmes	
1926	The Bat	Brooks Bailey	
1926	Brown of Harvard	Jim Doolittle	
1926	Exit Smiling	Jimmy Marsh	
1928	Gang War	Clyde Baxter	Alternative title: All Square, Lost film

== Bibliography ==
- Arvidson, Linda. When the Movies Were Young. New York: Dover Publications, Inc., 1969.
- Menefee, David W. The First Male Stars: Men of the Silent Era. Albany: Bear Manor Media, 2007.
- Talmadge, Margaret L. The Talmadge Sisters. Philadelphia: J. B. Lippincott Company, 1924.
- Paris Authorities Investigate Death of Olive Thomas. The New York Times, September 11, 1920.
- POLICE DEMAND FURTHER PROBE OF OLIVE THOMAS' DEATH, The Washington times. (Washington D.C.) 1902-1939, September 12, 1920.
- Holmstrom, John. The Moving Picture Boy: An International Encyclopaedia from 1895 to 1995, Norwich: Michael Russell, 1996, pp. 10–11. ISBN 978-0-85955-178-6
- Mary Pickford: America's Sweetheart by Scott Eyman ISBN 978-1-55611-243-0
- Pickford: The Woman Who Made Hollywood by Eileen Whitfield
- The First King of Hollywood: The Life of Douglas Fairbanks by Tracey Goessel ISBN 978-1-61373-407-0
- Michelle Vogel. Olive Thomas: The Life and Death of a Silent Film Beauty ISBN 978-0-7864-2908-0
- Steve Vaught. "You Don't Know Jack – A Second Take on Jack Pickford"
- "Cleanup of Paris Cafes May Follow Movie Stars Death" Daily News, September 14, 1920
- Amy Marie. "The Final Years of Jack Pickford"
- Gordon Thomas. "Beautiful Dead Girl: On Early Hollywood Casualty Olive Thomas"
- Shane Brown. "The Man Who Had Everything: The Curious Case of Jack Pickford and the New York Times"

== See also ==
- Canadian Pioneers in Early Hollywood
