= The Lonesome Chap =

- Directed by: Edward LeSaint
- Screenplay by: Harvey Gates; Emma Rochelle Williams
- Starring: Louise Huff; House Peters Sr. John Burton; Eugene Pallette; J. Parks Jones; Pietro Buzzi
- Cinematography: Allen M. Davey
- Production company: Pallas Pictures
- Distributed by: Paramount Pictures
- Release date: April 19, 1917
- Running time: 50 minutes
- Country: United States
- Language: Silent (English intertitles)

The Lonesome Chap is a 1917 American silent drama film directed by Edward LeSaint and written by Harvey Gates and Emma Rochelle Williams. The film stars Louise Huff, House Peters Sr., John Burton, Eugene Pallette, J. Parks Jones and Pietro Buzzi. The film was released on April 19, 1917, by Paramount Pictures.

== Cast ==
- Louise Huff as Renee D'Armand
- House Peters Sr. as Stuart Kirkwood
- John Burton as Doc Nelson
- Eugene Pallette as George Rothwell
- J. Parks Jones as George Rothwell Jr.
- Pietro Buzzi as Victor D'Armand
- Betty Johnson as Peggy Carter

== Preservation ==
An incomplete print is held by the Library of Congress.
