= What Money Can't Buy =

- Directed by: Lou Tellegen
- Screenplay by: George Broadhurst; Beulah Marie Dix
- Produced by: Jesse L. Lasky
- Starring: Jack Pickford; Louise Huff; Theodore Roberts; Hobart Bosworth; Raymond Hatton; James Cruze
- Cinematography: Paul P. Perry
- Production company: Jesse L. Lasky Feature Play Company
- Distributed by: Paramount Pictures
- Release date: July 16, 1917
- Running time: 50 minutes
- Country: United States
- Language: English

What Money Can't Buy is a 1917 American drama silent film directed by Lou Tellegen and starring Jack Pickford, Louise Huff, Theodore Roberts, Hobart Bosworth, Raymond Hatton and James Cruze. It was written by George Broadhurst and Beulah Marie Dix. The film was released on July 16, 1917, by Paramount Pictures.

== Cast ==
- Jack Pickford as Dick Hale
- Louise Huff as Princess Irenia
- Theodore Roberts as Madison Hale
- Hobart Bosworth as Govrian Texler
- Raymond Hatton as King Stephen III
- James Cruze as Ferdinand Vaslof
- James Neill as The Cardinal
- Bliss Chevalier as Countess Bonaco
