= Natalie Sumner Lincoln =

American novelist (1881–1935)

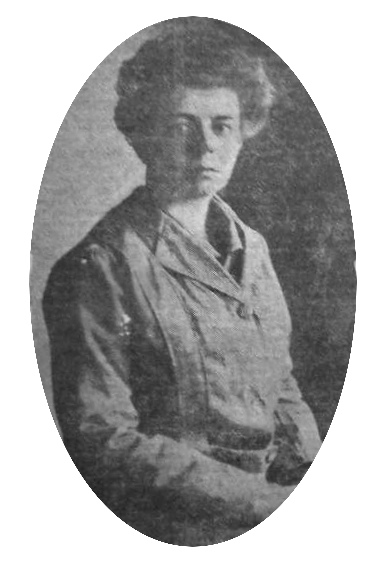
- Born: October 4, 1881; Washington, D.C.
- Died: August 31, 1935 (aged 53); Washington, D.C.
- Occupation: Crime writer, novelist, writer
- Parent(s): Nathan Smith Lincoln; Jeanie Gould
- Relatives: G. Gould Lincoln

Natalie Sumner Lincoln (October 4, 1881 – August 31, 1935) was an American novelist who wrote mystery and crime novels mostly set in her native Washington, D.C.

Natalie Sumner Lincoln was born on October 4, 1881, in Washington, D.C. She was the daughter of Dr. Nathan Smith Lincoln, Civil War physician and White House physician to US President James A. Garfield, and Jeanie Gould, novelist and children's author. Her brother was political reporter George Gould Lincoln. She was educated at Laura A. Flint's Private School in Washington.

Lincoln was society editor for the Washington Herald from 1912 to 1914. She was editor of the Daughters of the American Revolution Magazine from April 1915 until her death.

Lincoln wrote 22 novels, all but one set in Washington, D.C. About half of them featured either Inspector Mitchell or Detective Ferguson of the Washington, DC police. Two of her novels were adapted as silent films: The Man Inside (1916) and Black Shadows (1920), the latter based on her novel The Official Chaperon. She also contributed short stories to a number of magazines, including Smith's Magazine, McCall's, All Story, and Detective Story Magazine.

She made philatelist headlines in 1930 when she discovered one of her father's letters with a rare postmaster provisional stamp from Baltimore postmaster James M. Buchanan, which she sold for $10,000.

Natalie Sumner Lincoln died at her Hawthorne Street home in Washington, D.C., on August 31, 1935.

== Bibliography ==
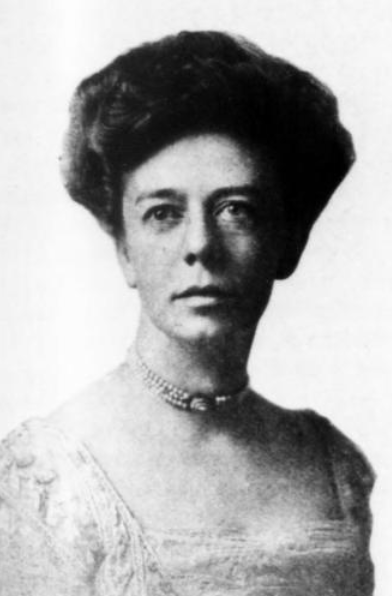
Natalie S. Lincoln, from a 1918 publication

Inspector Mitchell

- I Spy (1916)
- The Nameless Man (1917)
- The Moving Finger (1918)
- The Three Strings (1918)
- The Cat's Paw (1922)
- The Meredith Mystery (1923)
- The Missing Initial (1925)
- The Blue Car Mystery (1926)
- The Dancing Silhouette (1927)
- P.P.C. (1927)

Detective Ferguson

- The Red Seal (1920)
- The Unseen Ear (1921)

Other novels

- The Trevor Case (1912)
- The Lost Despatch (1913)
- The Man Inside (1914)
- C.O.D. (1915)
- The Official Chaperon (1915)
- The Thirteenth Letter (1924)
- The Secret of Mohawk Pond (1928)
- The Fifth Latchkey (1929)
- Marked "Canceled" (1930)
- 13 Thirteenth Street (1932)
