= Gang War (1928 film) =

1928 film by Bert Glennon

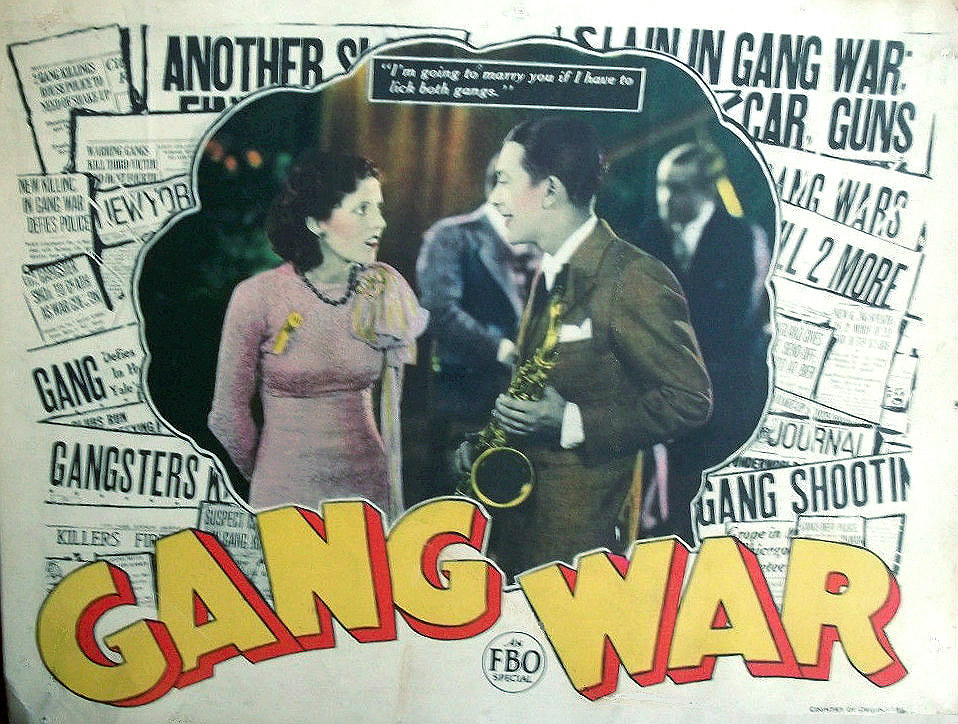
- Lobby card
- Directed by: Bert Glennon; Charles Kerr (assistant)
- Story by: James Ashmore Creelman (story); Fred Myton (scenario); Edgar Allan Woolf (dialogue)
- Starring: Jack Pickford; Olive Borden
- Cinematography: Virgil Miller
- Edited by: Archie Marshek
- Music by: Al Sherman
- Production company: Film Booking Offices of America (FBO)
- Distributed by: Film Booking Offices of America
- Release date: September 2, 1928
- Running time: 70 minutes
- Country: United States
- Languages: Sound (part-talkie); English intertitles

Gang War (released as All Square in the UK) is a 1928 American sound part-talkie gangster film directed by Bert Glennon, best known for being the main feature attached to Steamboat Willie, the debut of Mickey Mouse in sound. In addition to sequences with audible dialogue or talking sequences, the film features a synchronized musical score and sound effects along with English intertitles. The soundtrack was recorded using the RCA Photophone sound-on-film system. Despite the synchronised sound as well as the all-star cast, the film is largely unknown in its own right. One reel of an original 35mm positive print of nitrate film survives at the BFI film archive. The rest of the film appears to be lost. The film has been overshadowed by its far more famous preceding short, Steamboat Willie. The film starred Jack Pickford in his last major role as "Clyde", a saxophone player whose love for a dancer named Flowers (Olive Borden) traps him in the middle of a gang war.

== Plot ==
In Prohibition-era San Francisco, rival bootleg gangs rule the underworld. At the heart of the turf war is the "Bridge Street Gang," led by brutal and unrelenting Mike Luego (Walter Long). When a truckload of his liquor is hijacked by the notorious “Blackjack” Connell (Eddie Gribbon), Luego vows vengeance—and blood.

Meanwhile, at a seedy waterfront dance hall, timid but talented saxophonist Clyde Baxter (Jack Pickford) begins his first night in the orchestra. His music draws the attention of Flowers (Olive Borden), a stunning "taxi dancer" known for the silver blossoms in her hair. She performs a solo, catching Clyde’s heart—but Blackjack, a dangerous man with a possessive streak, makes it clear she’s his girl. Only Wong (Frank Chew), Blackjack’s clever Chinese companion, understands the emotional triangle unfolding.

Blackjack, determined to secure Flowers, obtains a marriage license. But Flowers, already captivated by Clyde’s gentleness and talent, resists his pressure. She shows him a new dance step taught by Clyde, unknowingly revealing the saxophonist as a romantic rival.

Fueled by rage, Blackjack leads a violent retaliation against Luego’s men at their wharf-side headquarters. Machine guns blaze as gangland vengeance is unleashed in a hail of bullets. Wong convinces Blackjack to wait until Chinese New Year, when the city’s noise and fireworks can mask their final assault.

That same night, Clyde—disheartened by what he thinks is Flowers’ rejection—wanders to the waterfront. She follows, and under a sky lit by bursting fireworks, he confesses his love. Flowers is moved, but terrified of Blackjack’s wrath. She pleads with Clyde to leave. But Clyde, defiant and sincere, insists on walking her home.

Later, Blackjack storms the Chandler’s shop—Luego’s headquarters—and leaves it in ruins, his revenge seemingly complete. When he hears Clyde is with Flowers, he rushes to her apartment with Wong in tow.

Clyde and Flowers are at the door when she suddenly changes. Sensing Blackjack’s presence, she coldly rejects Clyde and claims to love Blackjack, sending Clyde into despair. When Blackjack arrives, Flowers agrees to marry him immediately—just to save Clyde’s life. Clyde is left under Wong’s watch.

Later, Clyde gains the upper hand and seizes Wong’s gun—but when Luego’s gang shows up, Wong begs him not to reveal Blackjack’s whereabouts, warning that it would cost Blackjack and Flowers their lives. Clyde relents. Wong escapes. Clyde is beaten unconscious and dragged to Luego’s cellar hideout.

Flowers and Blackjack are hastily married. But when Wong tells them of Clyde’s sacrifice, Flowers breaks down and confesses she has only ever loved Clyde. Stricken, Blackjack promises to make things right and leaves to confront Luego.

At the Chandler’s shop, Flowers fights her way through the gang to reach the cellar. Gunfire erupts. She bursts into the room—only to find Blackjack, mortally wounded, slumped on the floor. He has given his life in penance.

Clyde, unharmed, steps from the shadows. He explains that Blackjack offered himself in exchange for Clyde’s release, asking only that Flowers be told he had squared the debt. The gangster’s final act of honor has freed them both.

Clyde and Flowers walk out together—free at last from the gang war that nearly destroyed them.

== Cast ==
- Jack Pickford as Clyde Baxter
- Olive Borden as Flowers
- Lorin Raker as Reporter In The Prologue
- Jack McKee as Reporter In The Prologue
- Mabel Albertson as Reporter In The Prologue
- Eddie Gribbon as "Blackjack"
- Walter Long as Mike Luego
- Frank Chew as Wong

== Music ==
The film featured a theme song entitled "My Suppressed Desire" which was composed by Chester Conn and Ned Miller. Another song entitled "Ya Comin' Up Tonight Huh?," which was composed by Abe Lyman, Al Lewis and Al Sherman, was also featured on the soundtrack of the film. Other songs heard on the sound are "Low Down" by Jo Trent and Peter Rose and "I Love Me" by Will Mahoney.

== Production ==
Gang War was produced in black and white on Academy ratio 35 mm film, and was originally to be a synchronized sound film without audible dialogue. In order to be able to advertise the film as a talkie, a spoken prologue was added, in which a group of reporters (including one played by Mabel Albertson) discuss the events that are to come.

== Reception ==
Reception to the film was rather muted; while The New York Times called it "better than the majority of its ilk", the paper still dismissed it as "More Gang Fights". In particular, the paper found the film to be rather cliché – it balked at the sentimentality of Blackjack's death scene and claimed the writers "would confer a favor upon a patient public if they mutinied against the use of some words, especially that simple monosyllable, 'well'".

== See also ==
- List of early sound feature films (1926–1929)
