= What Women Want (1920 film) =

1920 film by George Archainbaud

- Directed by: George Archainbaud
- Written by: George Middleton (story); Garfield Thompson
- Produced by: American Cinema Corp.
- Starring: Louise Huff
- Cinematography: Lucien Tainguy
- Distributed by: Pioneer Films
- Release date: September 1, 1920
- Running time: 5 reels
- Country: USA
- Languages: Silent film English intertitles

What Women Want is a surviving 1920 silent film drama directed by George Archainbaud and starring Louise Huff.

A print is preserved in the Library of Congress collection.

== Plot ==
During World War I, young Frenchwoman Francine D'Espard meets U.S. Army officer William Holliday at the front, and they become engaged.

Returning to America, William finds his father at the mercy of his business rival, Ezekiel Bates. Shortly after, when Francine arrives in America to marry her fiancé, she is informed that her lover is about to marry Bates' daughter Susan.

Her love now turning to hate, Francine devotes herself to the task of destroying her former suitor. Through her connections with the U.S. Secret Service, the two are involved in many adventures, and just as Francine is about to avenge herself, she discovers that Holliday has been true to her the whole time.

Upon finding evidence that Bates, in addition to being the cause of all their troubles, has also defrauded the government, Francine has him arrested and finally reunites with her lover. —AFI from IMDB

== Cast ==
- Louise Huff - Francine D'Espard
- Van Dyke Brooke - William Holliday Sr.
- Robert Ames - William Holliday Jr.
- Clara Beyers - Countess de Chevigny
- Howard Truesdale - Ezekiel Bates
- Betty Brown - Susan
