= A Girl of Yesterday =

1915 film by Allan Dwan

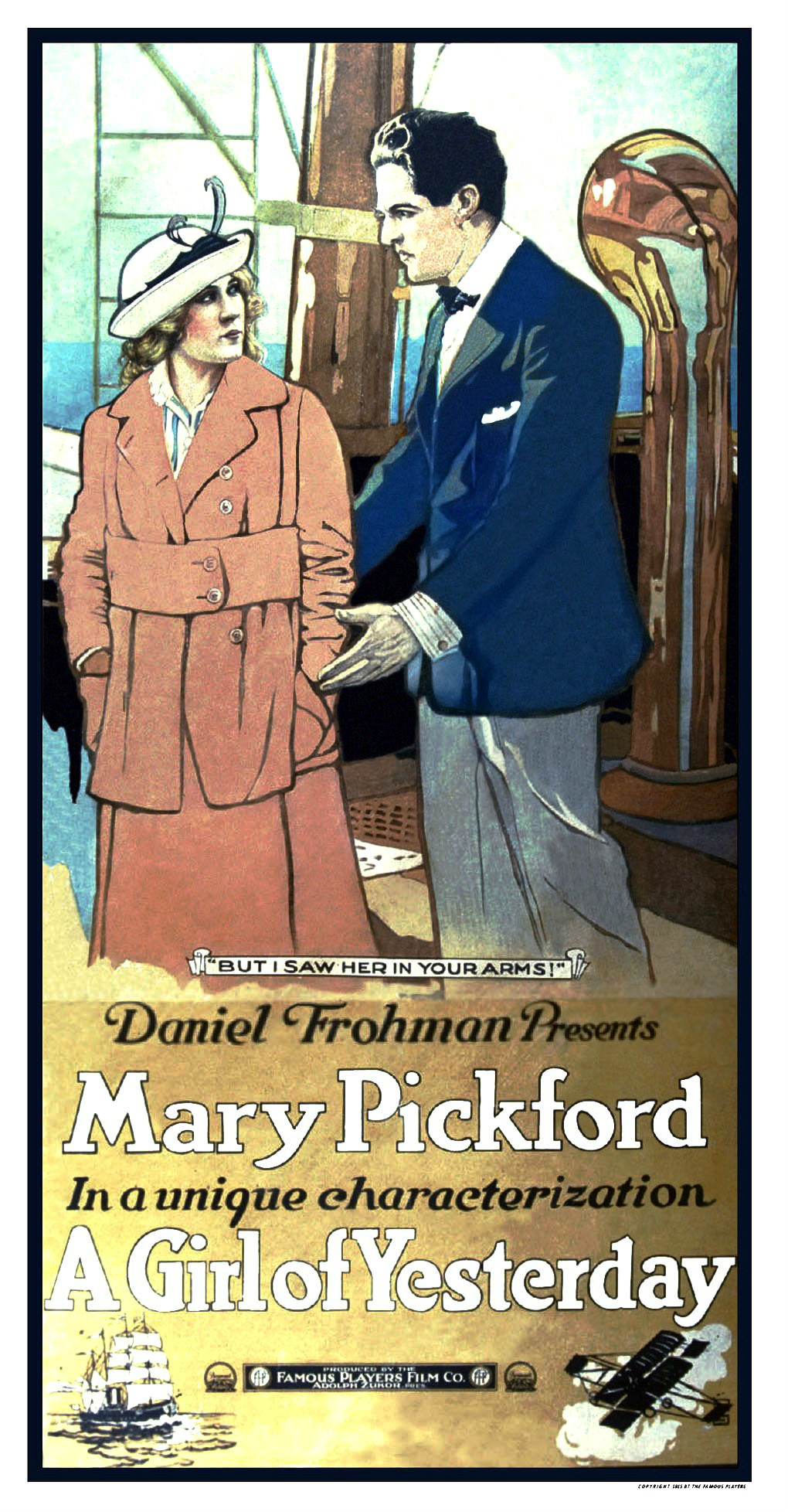
- Theatrical poster
- Directed by: Allan Dwan
- Written by: Mary Pickford (scenario); Frances Marion (screenplay)
- Story by: Wesley C. MacDermott
- Produced by: Daniel Frohman; Adolph Zukor
- Starring: Mary Pickford; Frances Marion; Jack Pickford; Marshall Neilan
- Production company: Famous Players Film Co.
- Distributed by: Famous Players–Lasky; Paramount Pictures
- Release date: October 7, 1915
- Running time: Five reels length
- Country: United States
- Languages: Silent; English intertitles

A Girl of Yesterday is a 1915 American silent comedy film directed by Allan Dwan, and distributed by Paramount Pictures and Famous Players–Lasky. The film starred Mary Pickford (who also wrote the scenario) as an older woman. Before this film, Pickford was mainly cast in "little girl" roles which were popular with the public. A Girl of Yesterday costarred Pickford's younger brother Jack, Marshall Neilan, Donald Crisp and Frances Marion, who later became a prolific screenwriter. Real life aviation pioneer Glenn L. Martin also made a cameo in the film.

== Plot ==
Jane Stuart, a sweet old-fashioned girl brought up with her brother John, by their poor Aunt Angela, suddenly inherits wealth. While she tries to retain her traditional wardrobe, customs and ways, her brother likes the attention that is now being paid to them by people like their neighbours, the Monroes, who previously shunned them.

Rosanna Danford, is “the wicked sophisticate” who has her eye on Stanley Hudson, Mary's beau. At her first reception, Jane, now wealthy, is still wearing her grandmother's old-fashioned gown. She, however, is dressed more demurely compared to the other girls at the event and attracts a group of male admirers.

Jane later tries to fit in with a new crowd, and attempts tennis and golf. She accepts an invitation to go yachting from Stanley, who, hoping to win Jane, has attempted to introduce her to a new luxurious life. Rosanna is jealous and arranges for a pilot to take Jane flying, planning that she will miss the outing and be far away from Stanley. Jane is "kidnapped" and taken away by an aircraft.

Although a misunderstanding follows, Jane later accepts Stanley's belated proposal.

== Cast ==
- Mary Pickford as Jane Stuart
- Jack Pickford as John Stuart
- Gertrude Norman as Aunt Angela
- Donald Crisp as A.H. Monroe
- Marshall Neilan as Stanley Hudson
- Frances Marion as Rosanna Danford
- Lillian Langdon as Mrs. A.H. Monroe
- Claire Alexander as Eloise Monroe
- Glenn L. Martin as Pilot
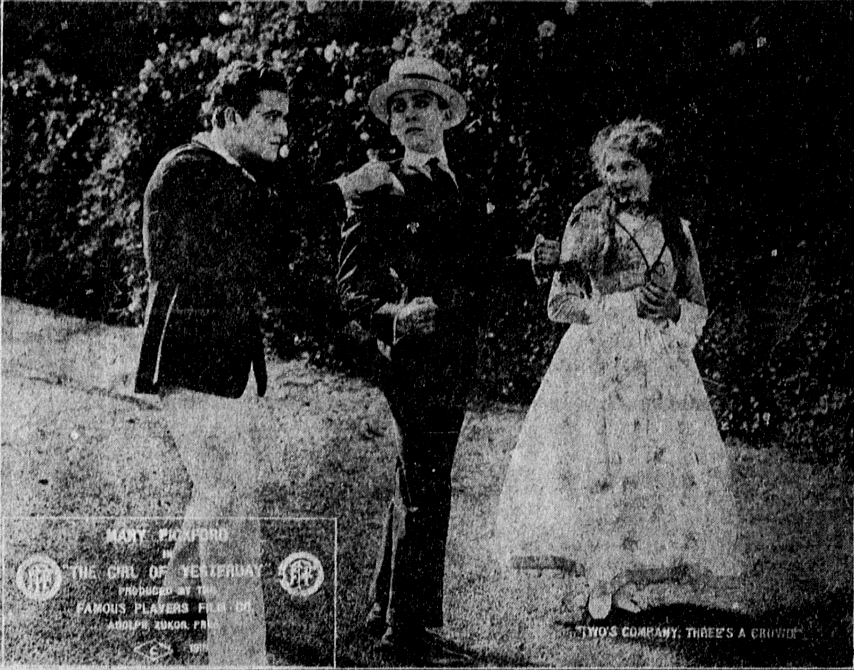
Promotional still

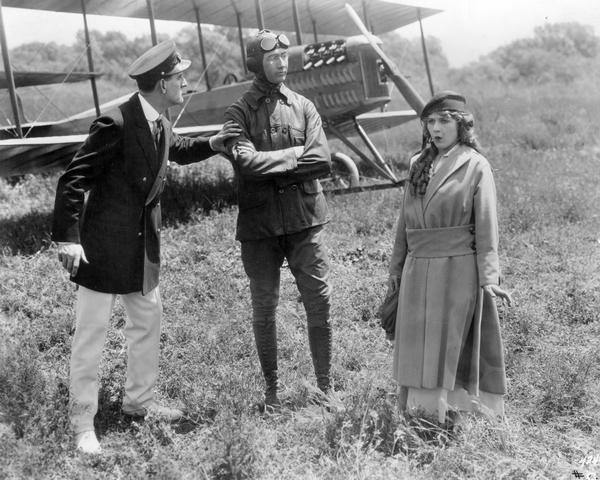
Kenneth Douglas, (Note: Pickford includes this photo in her book, Sunshine and Shadow. She states it is supporting player Kenneth Douglas – the man in the photo certainly is not Donald Crisp.) aviator Glenn Martin, and Mary Pickford

== Production ==
The flying scene in A Girl of Yesterday where Mary Pickford is taken away by an aircraft, was filmed in Griffith Park, Los Angeles, California. When Mary and Jack Pickford, appeared in roles as brother and sister in this film, it was the first time actual brother and sister were cast.

A Girl of Yesterday was notable for the screen debut of famous pioneering aviator Glenn L. Martin. He flew a Martin TT biplane, one of his own designs at Griffith Park, where he operated a flying school. In 1912, Martin built an airplane factory in Los Angeles. To finance this business, he began stunt-flying at fairs and local airfields. In 1915, Martin saw an advertisement for a pilot/aircraft owner to play a role in a film. Sensing an opportunity, he replied to the ad and got the part. Martin would play the role of a dashing hero in A Girl of Yesterday starring Mary Pickford. (Note: Martin soon found that it would be harder than he thought. In addition to flying Pickford around in his aircraft, he had a scene where he had to kiss Frances Marion. In describing his hesitation having to kiss Marion, Martin declared, "my mother would not like it", which astounded Pickford. after persuasion by Paramount boss Adolph Zukor, he worked up his courage, however, and completed the scene.)

The multimillion-dollar yacht that Mary Pickford and Marshall Neilan use on a date, belonged to "Sugar King" John D. Spreckels of San Francisco.

== Reception ==
Resident Scholar Cari Beauchamp in writing at the "Mary Pickford Foundation", described the loss of A Girl of Yesterday as particularly poignant. "...one of her “lost” films – 'A Girl of Yesterday' from 1915 – that is particularly missed because there were so many things about it that made it special." The film brought together many old friends. "Mickey Neilan, a friend of Jack Pickford’s who had been working in films for several years, but wanted to direct. (Many filmographies credit Mary with writing the story, but in his memoirs, Mickey Neilan claims that Frances [Marion] wrote it)." Further, "All those close inner connections simmering in the cast and crew could have wreaked havoc, but everyone involved seemed to enjoy each other and [Allan] Dwan was secure enough in his own abilities to include others in the creative process."

The beautiful locales such as Santa Catalina Island were also featured in A Girl of Yesterday. "In part it is the thought of seeing all these locations circa 1915 that makes the loss of 'A Girl of Yesterday' such a heartbreak for film fans. Of course it would also be great fun to see Jack Pickford, Mary Pickford, Mickey Neilan and Frances Marion all together on the screen, knowing as we do that Mary, Mickey and Frances would work together often in the years ahead and be lifelong friends."

== Preservation status ==
The film is now presumed to be a lost film.

== See also ==
- List of lost films
