= Destiny's Toy =

1916 film by John B. O'Brien

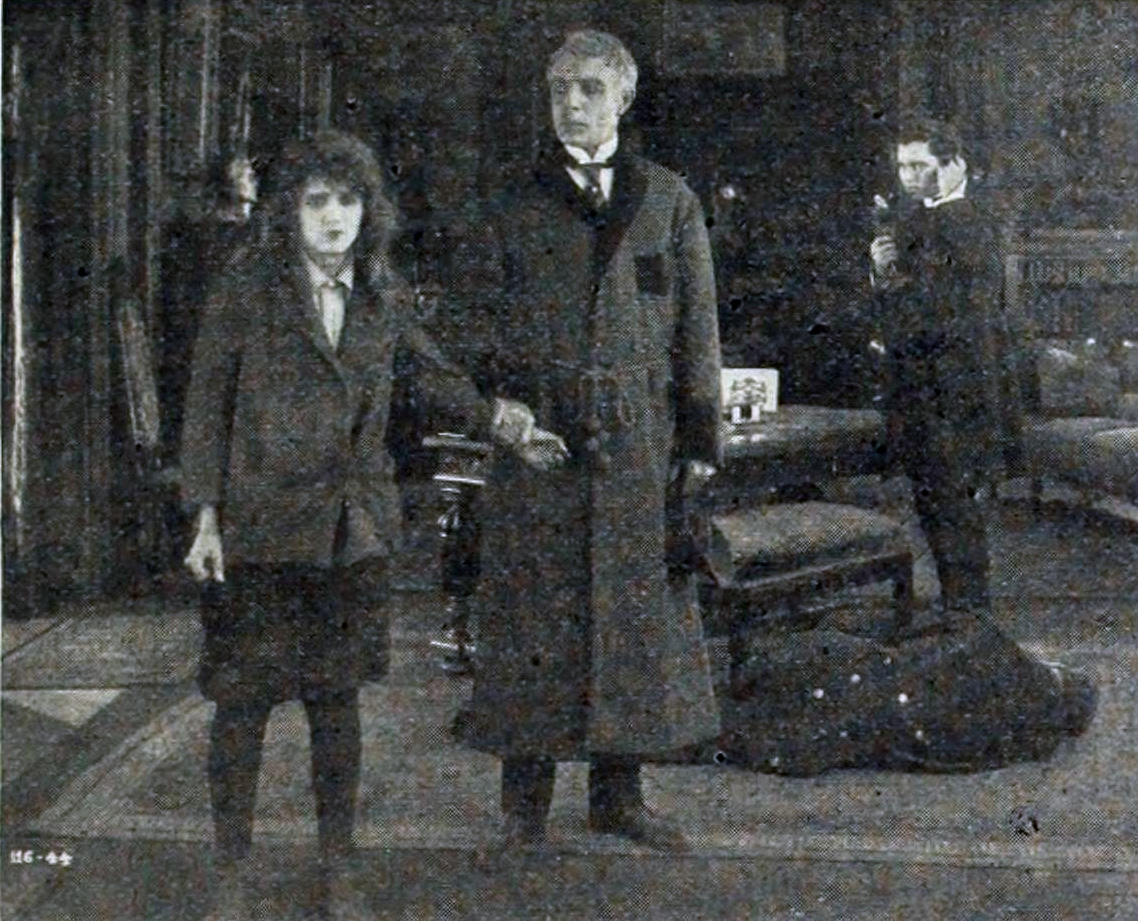
- Still with Louise Huff and J. W. Johnston
- Directed by: John B. O'Brien
- Written by: John B. O'Brien
- Produced by: Famous Players (Adolph Zukor)
- Starring: Louise Huff
- Cinematography: Wray Physioc
- Distributed by: Paramount Pictures
- Release date: June 15, 1916
- Running time: 5 reels
- Country: United States
- Language: Silent (English intertitles)

Destiny's Toy is a surviving 1916 American silent drama film written and directed by John B. O'Brien and starring Louise Huff. It was produced by the Famous Players Film Company and released by Paramount Pictures. Prints are held in the Library of Congress collection and at the George Eastman Museum.

== Cast ==
- Louise Huff as Nan
- John Bowers as Reverend Robert Carter
- J. W. Johnston as Thomas Carter
- Harry Lee as Barnacle Joe
- Mary Gray as Carter child
- John T. Dillon as Bad Riley (credited as John Dillon)
- Hattie Forsythe as Mrs. Carter
- Tammany Young as Tick
- Eddie Sturgis as Dopey (credited as Ed Sturgis)
- Kate Lester as Mrs. Calvin
- Florence Johns as Mrs. Calvin's Daughter
