= In Wrong =

1919 film by James Kirkwood

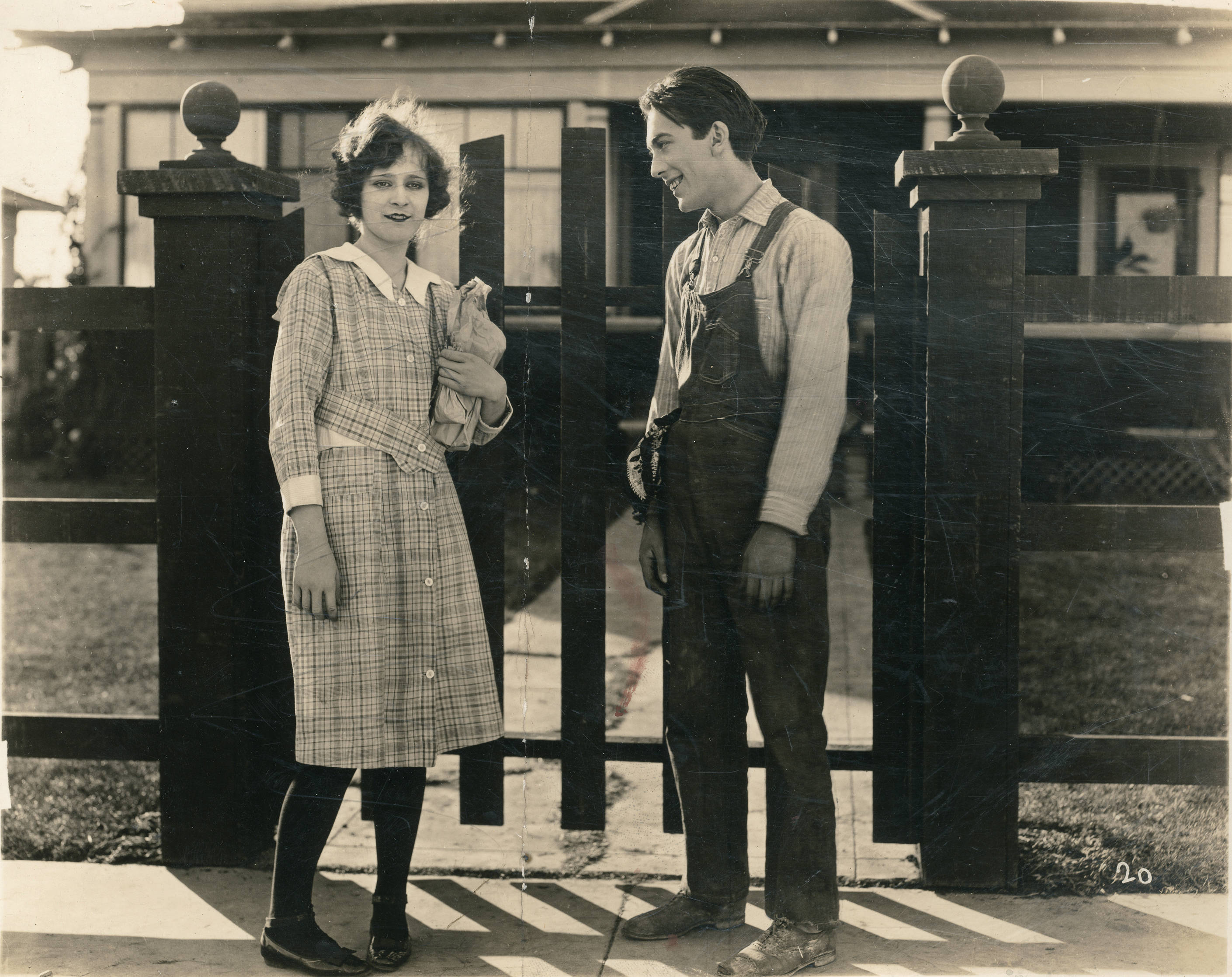
- Still with Marguerite De La Motte and Jack Pickford
- Directed by: James Kirkwood
- Written by: James Kirkwood
- Based on: a screen story by James Kirkwood
- Produced by: Jack Pickford
- Starring: Jack Pickford
- Cinematography: Tony Gaudio; Sol Polito
- Production company: Jack Pickford Film Company
- Distributed by: First National Exhibitors
- Release date: October 19, 1919
- Running time: 5 reels
- Country: United States
- Language: Silent (English intertitles)

In Wrong is a 1919 American silent comedy film directed by James Kirkwood and produced by and starring Jack Pickford. It was released through First National Exhibitors.

== Cast ==
- Jack Pickford as Johnny Spivins
- Marguerite De La Motte as Millie Fields
- Clara Horton as Dolly Sheldon
- George Dromgold as Morgan Coleman
- Hardee Kirkland as Henry Wallace
- Robin Williamson as Val Heaton
- Lydia Knott as Johnny's mother
- Pard as Pard, a dog

uncredited

- May Robson as woman visiting store

== Preservation status ==
In Wrong is preserved in the Library of Congress film collection.
