= G. Gould Lincoln =

American political reporter

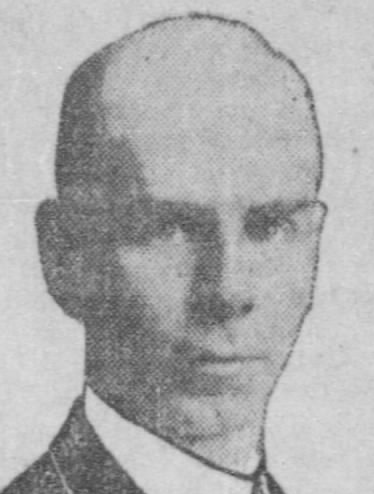
- Born: George Gould Lincoln; July 26, 1880; Washington, D.C., U.S.
- Died: December 1, 1974 (aged 94); Washington, D.C., U.S.
- Education: Yale University (BA)
- Occupation: Political reporter
- Writing career
- Notable awards: Presidential Medal of Freedom (1970)

George Gould Lincoln (July 26, 1880 – December 1, 1974) was an American political reporter between the 1900s to 1960s. Lincoln started at The Washington Times and The Washington Post during the 1900s before joining the Washington Evening Star in 1909. With the Evening Star, Lincoln was a political reporter and named the newspaper's chief political writer in 1925. Lincoln remained with the Evening Star until his 1964 retirement and received the Presidential Medal of Freedom in 1970.

== Early life and education ==
Lincoln was born on July 26, 1880 in Washington, D.C. For his post-secondary education, Lincoln graduated with a Bachelor of Arts from Yale University in 1902. His parents were Nathan Smith Lincoln and Jeanie Gould and his sister was Natalie Sumner Lincoln.

== Career ==
Before entering journalism, Lincoln was part of Thomas Edison's 1902 exploration team that looked for nickel in Canada. That year, Lincoln started at the local news department for The Washington Times before becoming editor of the newspaper's Sunday edition. In 1903, Lincoln went to South Carolina and became an assistant superintendent for a tea plantation before resuming his reportorial position in 1904.

After focusing on the U.S. federal government with the Times, Lincoln joined The Washington Post in 1906 and published stories about the U.S House of Representatives. Upon joining the Washington Evening Star in 1909, Lincoln continued to report on politics for almost six decades. With the Evening Star, Lincoln was named chief political writer in 1925 and remained with the newspaper until he retired in 1964.

== Awards and honors ==
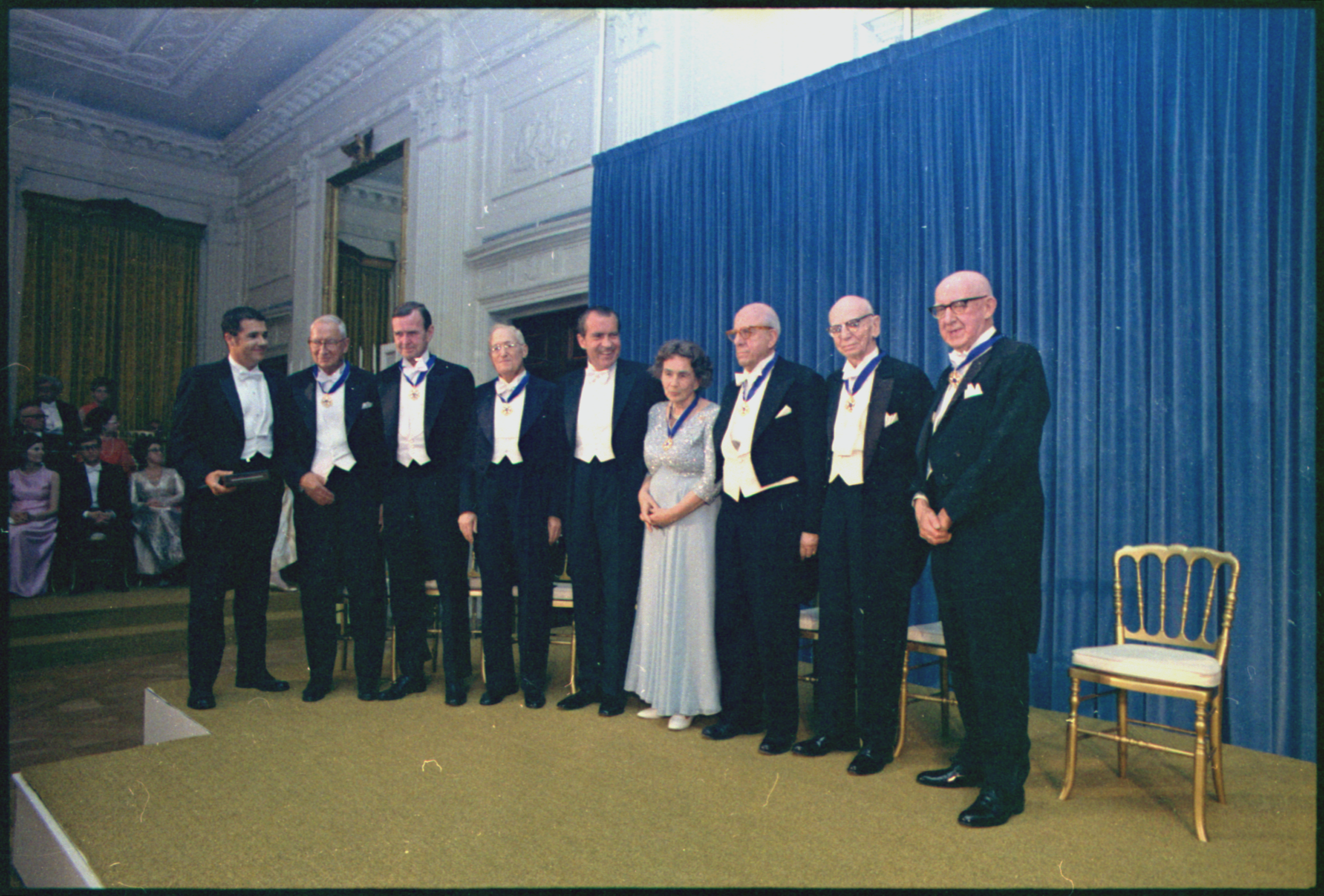
Lincoln, second from the right in image, accepts the Presidential Medal of Freedom from President Richard Nixon on April 22, 1970.

In 1970, Lincoln was awarded the Presidential Medal of Freedom. The citation recognized Lincoln's "great integrity, unfailing skill and uncompromising professionalism".

== Personal life ==
Lincoln died on December 1, 1974, in Washington, D.C. Lincoln was married and had two children from a previous marriage.
