= Robert M. Barr =

Bob Barr (1918–1988) was the conductor of the Jordan High School Band in Columbus, Georgia from 1946 to 1963. Under his direction, the band achieved the highest acclaim winning many state and national titles.

Barr was born in Hartford, Oklahoma and he studied at the Cincinnati Conservatory of Music before becoming a teacher. He was a chorus director in Fort Benning, before moving on to his position at Jordan. He was a national champion as a tuba player and at one point in his younger days played with the Indianapolis Symphony Orchestra. His Jordan High School Band was voted the American Legion Award as the nation's outstanding high school band in 1952. He became conductor of the revived Columbus Symphony in 1950 and founded the Columbus Youth Symphony in 1955.

His success caused Muscogee County schools to divide their band and chorus departments---a separation that continues today. In 1987, Jordan was named to the Historic Roll of Honor of High School Concert Bands from 1920 to 1960 by the John Philip Sousa Foundation. His bands at Jordan High and Glynn Academy in Brunswick, Ga. won 32 consecutive superior rankings. He was also a teacher for the Brevard Music Center camp from the mid '60's through the mid '70's.

After leaving Glynn Academy, he spent several years at Converse College in Spartanburg, SC before his retirement. He was president and national vice-president of Phi Beta Mu and is recorded in the Phi Beta Mu Band Director's Fraternity Hall of Fame and the National High School Band Director's Hall of Fame. Barr was awarded the First Chair of America by the National Band Organization and the Teacher of Excellence Award by the Valley Forge Foundation.

Since his death in 1988, the Bob Barr Community Band has been playing in his memory for the city of Columbus.
