= Justina Huff =

American actress (1893–1977)

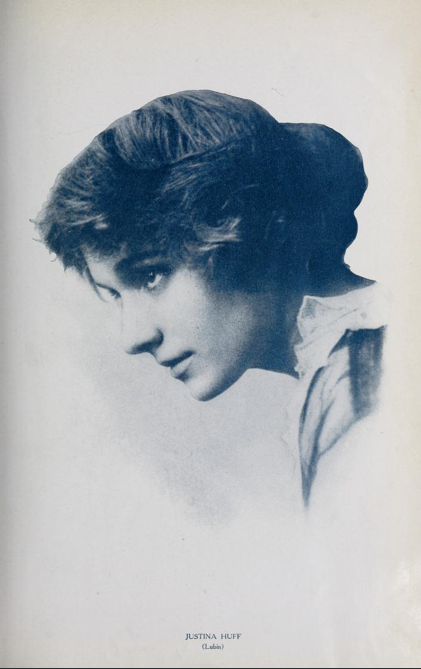
- Motion Picture Magazine, August 1914
- Born: September 8, 1893; Columbus, Georgia, U.S.
- Died: June 29, 1977 (aged 83); Philadelphia, Pennsylvania, U.S.
- Occupation: Actress
- Years active: 1913–1916
- Spouse: John P. Chapman (m. 1915; died 1968)
- Children: 2
- Relatives: Louise Huff (sister)

Justina Huff (September 8, 1893 – June 29, 1977) was an American actress of the silent film era.

== Early life ==
Justina Huff was born in Columbus, Georgia, in 1893. She was the oldest daughter of Thomas D. Huff and Lucinda (Salisbury) Huff. She had three older brothers, Thomas Salisbury, Mercer, and Robert; one younger sister, Louise; and one younger brother, T.D. Jr.

Her grandfather was William Salisbury, the owner of the local newspaper The Enquirer-Sun. He was murdered in 1878 by a local man who was called out as a troublemaker in an editorial penned by Justina's father, the city editor of that paper at the time.

The family moved to New York City around 1906, after the company Thomas Huff worked for was sold.

In 1908, Justina won a scholarship to attend Horace Mann Institute in Manhattan. Thomas Huff died in 1910. Lucinda had no skills and no means of support. The children found it necessary to seek work. Justina's younger sister Louise started acting with a traveling production company, appearing in Graustark in 1911 and Ben Hur in 1912. Justina decided to try her hand in the fledgling silent movie industry.

== Career ==
In 1913, Huff's first role in the movies was the maid in the Kate Kirby detective story The Diamond Crown for the Edison Co. She was then selected by famed actress Minnie Maddern Fiske for the part of Liza Lou in Tess of the d'Urbervilles for Famous Players Co. Huff then signed with Siegmund Lubin at Lubin Studios in Philadelphia, Pennsylvania, where she finished 1913 making A Son of His Father, Through Flaming Paths and Between Dances. She continued with Lubin through 1914 and 1915.

Her sister Louise had starting working at Lubin in 1913, where she met and married Edgar Jones, one of Lubin's stars and directors. Huff made several movies with her brother-in-law, both acting with and being directed by him. This includes her last film for Lubin, Under the Fiddler's Elm, in 1915. Lubin declared bankruptcy 1916 after a disastrous fire destroyed most of its film archive, and legal and financial problems forced it out of the business. Justina, Louise and Edgar all sought work at other studios after Lubin folded. Huff made her last film, The Man Inside, for Universal in 1916.

== Marriage and family ==
Huff met her future husband at a dance in 1914. John P. Chapman was a doctor and professor of anatomy at the University of Pennsylvania. They were married on March 19, 1915, with the condition that she still be able to continue her film career. They had their first child, John W., in 1916, and Sally in 1918. Huff never made another film after giving birth to her first child. She settled into the role of wife and mother for her family in the suburbs of Philadelphia, and occasionally visiting family in Georgia and New York. Huff and her husband were expecting another child in 1925, but the baby boy arrived several months prematurely and only lived a few hours.

== Later life and death ==
John's medical career provided a high standard of living for them, and Huff developed a love of travel, especially to Europe. She traveled with husband and children several times between the world wars. After World War II, John and Justina began enjoying the culture and climate on the island of Majorca, Spain in the Mediterranean for extended periods.

John died in Dublin, Ireland in 1968. Huff was living in Majorca when her sister Louise died in 1973, but eventually returned to Philadelphia, where she died in 1977.

== Partial filmography ==
- Tess of the d’Urbervilles (1913)
- The Diamond Crown (1913)
- The Windfall (1914)
- The Engineer's Revenge (1914)
- The Marriage Wager (1914)
- Who Bears Malice (1915)
- The Beast (1915)
- On Bitter Creek (1915)
- Courage and the Man (1915)
- Under the Fiddler's Elm (1915)
- The Man Inside (1916)
