= Great Expectations (1917 film) =

1917 silent drama film

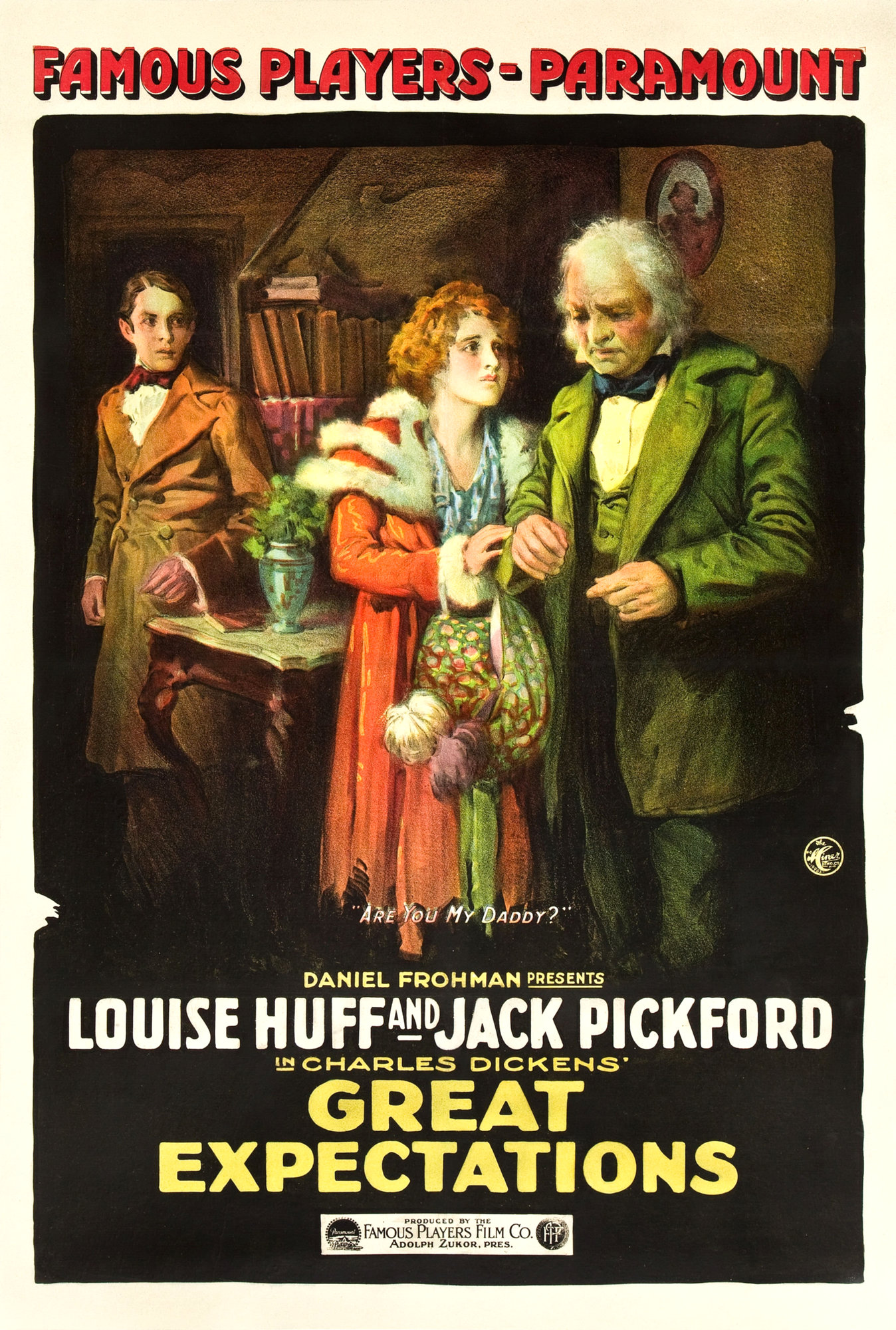
- Theatrical release poster
- Directed by: Robert G. Vignola; Paul West
- Written by: Paul West
- Based on: Great Expectations; 1861 novel by Charles Dickens
- Produced by: Daniel Frohman
- Starring: Jack Pickford
- Cinematography: William Marshall
- Distributed by: Paramount Pictures
- Release date: January 8, 1917
- Running time: 50 minutes
- Country: United States
- Languages: Silent; English intertitles

Great Expectations is a lost 1917 silent drama film directed by Robert G. Vignola and Paul West, based on the 1861 novel Great Expectations by Charles Dickens. Jack Pickford stars as Pip and Louise Huff as Estella.

== Cast ==
- Jack Pickford as Pip
- Louise Huff as Estella
- Frank Losee as Abel Magwitch / Provis
- William Black as Joe Gargery
- Marcia Harris as Mrs. Gargery
- Grace Barton as Miss Havisham
- Herbert Prior as Mr. Jaggers
