= Mile-a-Minute Kendall =

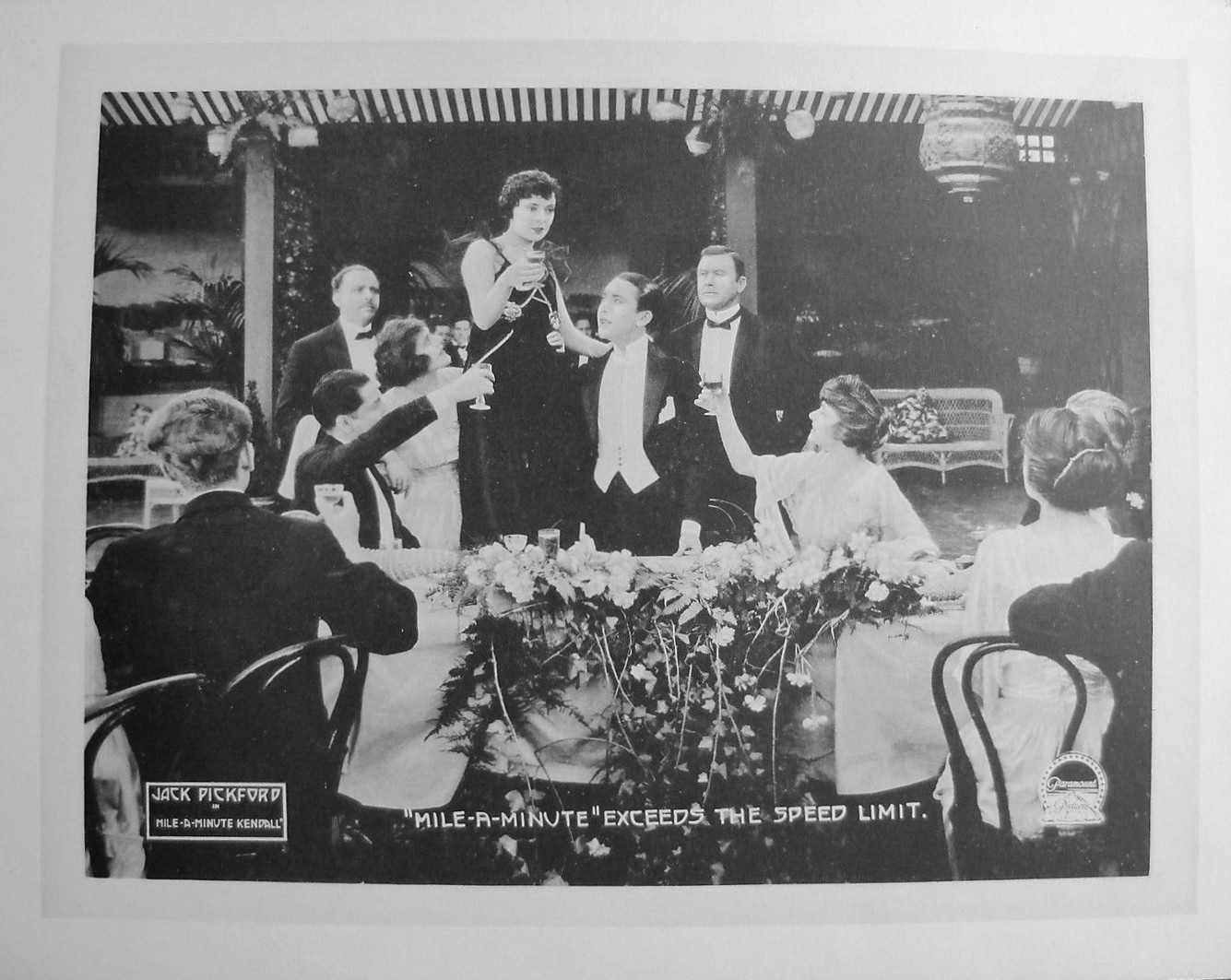
- Lobby card
- Directed by: William Desmond Taylor
- Written by: Gardner Hunting
- Based on: Mile-a-Minute Kendall by Owen Davis
- Produced by: Jesse L. Lasky
- Starring: Jack Pickford; Louise Huff; Charles Arling; Jane Wolfe; Casson Ferguson; Lottie Pickford
- Cinematography: Frank E. Garbutt
- Production company: Oliver Morosco Photoplay Company
- Distributed by: Famous Players–Lasky; Paramount Pictures
- Release date: May 13, 1918
- Running time: 5 reels
- Country: United States
- Language: Silent (English intertitles)

Mile-a-Minute Kendall is a 1918 American silent drama film directed by William Desmond Taylor and released by Paramount Pictures. Jack Pickford plays the title role, a wealthy, rakish young man who falls for a gold digger. The "beautiful but unscrupulous fortune hunter" who tempts Kendall is played by Lottie Pickford, Jack's sister; a contemporary review in Variety noted that "the idea of a sister 'vamping' her own brother is not exactly palatable." Louise Huff plays the "good girl" in the story.

== Cast ==
- Jack Pickford as Kendall
- Louise Huff as Jean Evans
- Charles Arling as Mr. Kendall
- Jane Wolfe as Mrs. Kendall (credited as Jane Wolff)
- Casson Ferguson as Eddie Semper
- Lottie Pickford as Rosalynde d'Aubre
- Jack McDonald as Jack Evans
- W. E. Lawrence as Philip Lund
- John Burton as Judge Weeks

== Reception ==
Good reviews marked the release of this film. Pickford received excellent reviews for his performance which was described as "refreshing" by Photoplay. Mile-a-Minute Kendall was paired with the Mack Sennett comedy short A Battle Royal in some theaters during its original release.

Like many American films of the time, Mile-a-Minute Kendall was subject to cuts by city and state film censorship boards. For example, the Chicago Board of Censors required cuts, in Reel 2, of the second view of a letter with the words "We'll always be friends on the side", two near views of intoxicated young woman seated on table smoking cigarettes, flash two scenes of semi-nude man and woman dancing in restaurant, first view of intoxicated young woman standing against wall, two scenes of bouncing young woman on tapestry and following scene of men carrying her off on their shoulders, scene of intoxicated woman on settee, and, Reel 4, the intertitle ending "That man has been her lover for years".

== Preservation ==
With no prints of Mile-a-Minute Kendall located in any film archives, it is a lost film.
