= Davian Chester =

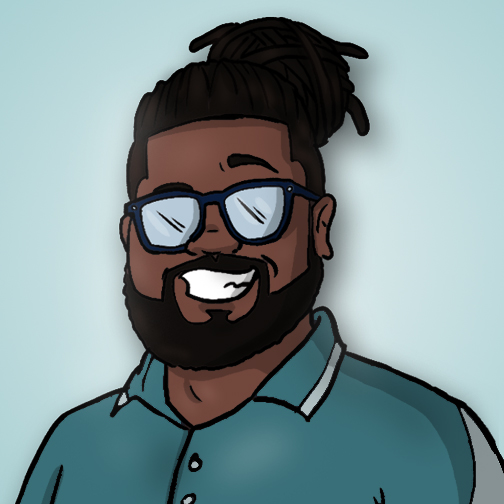
- Born: May 27, 1993
- Education: Chattahoochee Valley Community College

Davian Chester (born May 27, 1993), also known as the Juneteenth Guy, is a Georgia-based political cartoonist and graphic designer. In 2019, he garnered national attention for his Juneteenth Google Doodle—an homage art piece that went viral after the company failed to create its own doodle in honor of Juneteenth. Known for his Real Toons comics depicting issues in the Black community, Chester's work has been featured by various Internet news media and shared widely on social media. He is currently a regular contributor to The Miami Times.

== Biography ==
Chester was born and raised in Columbus, Georgia, where he still resides. He is African-American. He holds an associate degree in Visual Communications/Graphic Design from Chattahoochee Valley Community College.

== Career ==
Chester developed a largely African-American fanbase on social media with his Real Toons comics, in his own words, "illustrating the Black Experience." His comics typically address topical issues like police brutality, along with provocative questions to encourage lively debate.

On June 19, 2019, upon realizing Google had not done anything to honor the anniversary date of Juneteenth, he posted his own alternative doodle. It went viral in a matter of hours and he became an instant news story with major news outlets reporting on what he had done. This introduced the rest of the world to his work and to a holiday that until then was primarily only celebrated by African-Americans.

The following year, on June 19, 2020, the company created its first Google Doodle to honor the 155th anniversary of Juneteenth, observed by several news sources that also cited Chester's role the preceding year. That same year, Chester also created a serious and perhaps more timely Juneteenth art piece comparing African-Americans' relationship to the police immediately after slavery ended with their relationship to the police today. It was featured in the Atlanta Journal-Constitution, solidifying his status as the "Juneteenth Guy."

In August 2020, he became a regular contributor to The Miami Times, as well as The Cartoon Movement in March 2024.

Chester's artwork has graced several magazine covers, children's books, and albums, and has been shared on television and social media by numerous celebrities and influencers. He partners with leading brands such as the NAACP, Match.com(BLK), Lionsgate, and BET Her creating social media campaigns. In May 2022, his artwork was featured on The Real talk show. His artwork has also been featured by BuzzFeed, Blavity, Essence, and other Internet media.

== Awards & Exhibits ==
- 2018 "How Social Media Works," Embracing Our Differences Exhibit, Sarasota, Florida.
- 2024 "Black Hero 2024," Award at the Apex Museum during inaugural celebration of National Black Heroes Day.
