= Louise Huff =

American actress

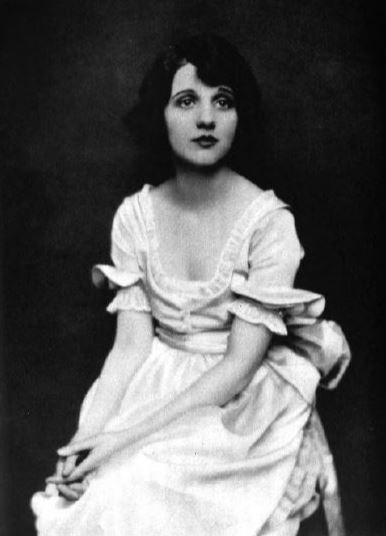
- Photo of Louise Huff from Photoplay Magazine (November 1920)
- Born: November 14, 1895; Columbus, Georgia, U.S.
- Died: August 22, 1973 (aged 77); New York City, U.S.
- Occupation: Actress
- Years active: 1911–1924
- Spouses: Edgar Jones (m. 1914, divorced) Edwin A. Stillman (m. 1920)
- Children: 3
- Relatives: Justina Huff (sister)

Louise Huff (November 14, 1895 – August 22, 1973) was an American actress of the silent film era.

== Biography ==
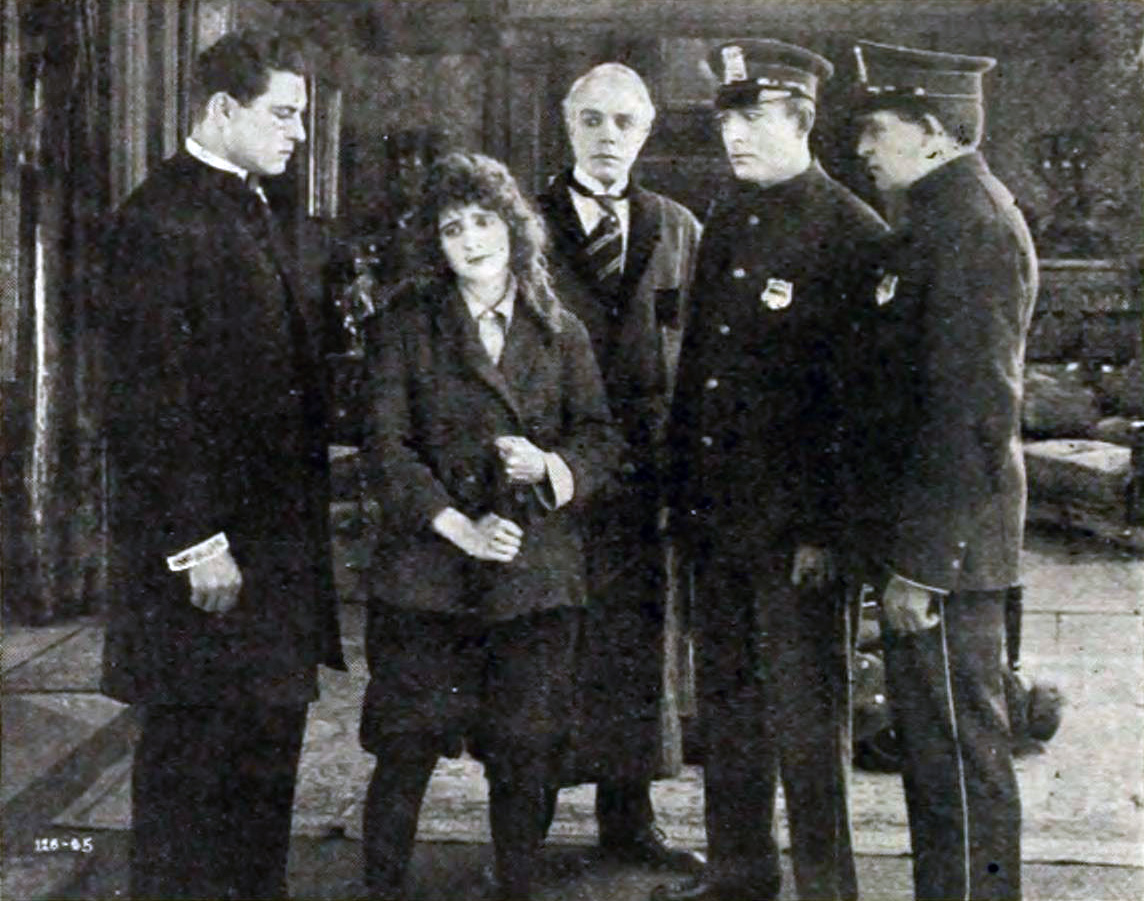
Destiny's Toy (1916)

Huff was a descendant of former President James Knox Polk. She began her acting career at the age of 15 and toured in productions of Ben-Hur and Graustark. She made her motion picture debut in 1913 with In the Bishop's Carriage and Caprice. Louise joined Lubin Studios in 1913 where she worked with actor and director Edgar Jones. She married Jones in 1914 and they had a daughter, Mary Louise in 1915. In 1916 she secured the ingenue role opposite Jack Pickford in the Booth Tarkington comedy Seventeen.

Huff was featured in motion pictures produced by Famous Players–Lasky and Paramount Pictures, and continued in films until 1922. Her later silent films included roles in Great Expectations (1917), Mile-a-Minute Kendall (1918), Oh, You Women! (1919), Disraeli (1921) and her final film, The Seventh Day (1922).

A biography by Hans J. Wollstein states:

A stage ingenue of some importance who had appeared in the original Broadway version of Ben Hur, brunette Louise Huff became a star with the pioneer Lubin Mfg. Company of Philadelphia. In scores of one- and two-reel melodramas and Westerns from the very early 1910s, Huff was especially popular in tandem with Edgar Jones, whom she married. Together, they relocated to California in the mid-1910s but her career was already on the wane and she retired in 1922. Her sister, Justina Huff, was also a Lubin star.

However, Wollstein erred in claiming that Louise appeared on Broadway with Ben Hur. It was actually a touring version of the play that appeared across the country. She did however play on Broadway after her screen career ended. She appeared in the Broadway productions of Mary the Third (1923) and The New Englander (1924).

Her fame was international as evidenced by memorabilia from a variety of countries, including a novelization of her film The Crook of Dreams from France and tobacco trading cards from Canada and the U.K. Her film The Seventh Day was considered lost until a copy turned up in a Czechoslovak film archive.

She married Edwin A. Stillman in 1920 and had two more children, William and Nancy. Stillman was president of Watson-Stillman, manufacturers of hydraulic machinery. In her later years, Louise resided at 155 East 72nd Street in New York and was a director of the Friends of the Theater and Music Collection at the Museum of the City of New York. She died in New York's Doctors Hospital on August 22, 1973.

== Partial filmography ==
- Caprice (1913)
- The Old Homestead (1915)
- The Ransom (1915)
- Marse Covington (1915)
- Destiny's Toy (1916)
- Seventeen (1916)
- The Sphinx (1916)
- The Reward of Patience (1916)
- Blazing Love (1916)
- Great Expectations (1917)
- The Lonesome Chap (1917)
- Freckles (1917)
- What Money Can't Buy (1917)
- The Varmint (1917)
- The Ghost House (1917)
- Jack and Jill (1917)
- Mile-a-Minute Kendall (1918)
- The Dangerous Paradise (1920)
- What Women Want (1920)
- Disraeli (1921)
- The Seventh Day (1922)
