= Ricky Bartlett =

Ricky Bartlett may refer to:

- Ricky Bartlett (cricketer) (born 1966), English cricketer for Somerset
- Ricky Bartlett (rugby union) (1891–1973), English international rugby union player
