= Jeanie Gould =

American novelist

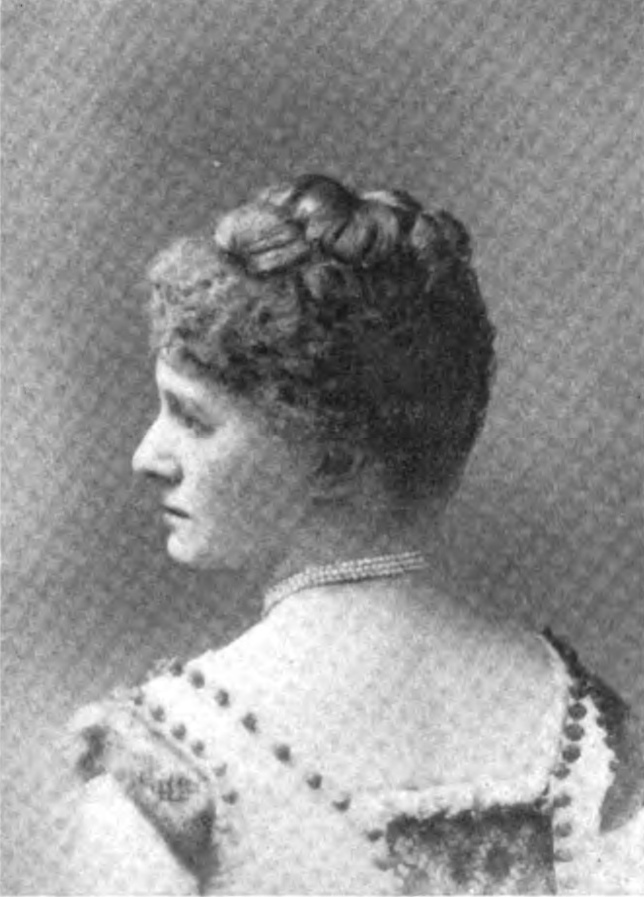
- Jeanie Gould Lincoln, from an 1898 publication.
- Born: Jeanie Thomas Gould; Unknown; Troy, New York, United States
- Died: August 8, 1921; Washington, D.C., United States
- Occupations: Novelist, poet
- Writing career
- Pen name: Daisy Ventnor
- Genre: Historical fiction

Jeanie Thomas Gould Lincoln (Unknown – August 8, 1921) was an American novelist and poet who wrote poetry, romance, and historical fiction. Professionally known as Jeanie Gould Lincoln, she also published poetry and short fiction in newspapers and magazines under the pen name Daisy Ventnor. Her novels included Marjorie's Quest (1872), Her Washington Season (1884), An Unwilling Maid (1897), and A Javelin of Fate (1905).

== Early life and education ==
Gould's birthdate is uncertain. Scholar Kim Roberts posits a birthdate of 1855. Her age in the 1920 United States Census is given as 72, which would mean an 1848 birthdate. However, her 1921 death certificate and family papers list a birthdate of May 28, 1842.

Gould was born Jeanie Thomas Gould to George and Sarah Vail Gould in Troy, New York. Her father was a judge of the New York Court of Appeals. Gould was privately educated at home by tutors.

== Career ==
Gould published her first book, a collection of poems called A Chaplet of Leaves (1869), at the encouragement of author and editor Nathaniel Parker Willis. The Boston Daily Evening Transcript praised the collection's "pleasant fancies and musical flow."

Gould's first novel, Marjorie's Quest (1872), was popular when released and continued to sell well two decades after its initial publication. Written for young people, the book takes place during the American Civil War. The protagonist, Marjorie, is on the Union side, and the plot centers on Marjorie's efforts to find her father.

Gould's book, Her Washington Season (1884), was an epistolary novel. Its characters were based on herself and Mrs. Benjamin Ogle Tayloe, a prominent figure in Washington D.C. society. The plot revolves around a misunderstanding between newlyweds Barbara and Harry Oglethrope, and the majority of the book focuses on Barbara's time in Washington society. Her Washington Season had mixed reviews. The Writer described the novel as an accurate chronicle of Washington high society, while Godey's Magazine considered it “in no way remarkable.”

After more than a decade without publishing a new book, Gould wrote A Genuine Girl (1896), a sequel to Marjorie's Quest, at the request of her publisher, Houghton & Mifflin. It reintroduces Marjorie, this time as a middle-aged woman, and follows the romantic adventures of her daughter.

Gould's next two novels were set during the American Revolutionary War. An Unwilling Maid (1897) is set in the final years of the war and follows the adventures of the main character, a young woman called Mistress Betty York, and her friends. A Pretty Tory (1899) chronicles the romance of Mistress Geraldine Moncriffe, a young Tory, and her suitor, a member of the Whig Party.

A Javelin of Fate (1906) is set in Baltimore at the close of the American Civil War. It explores the Confederate sympathies that created tension in Gould's family during that time. Reviews were mixed. The New York Times wrote that the novel “contains all the materials of a good story, but they have not been well put together”, while The Dial praised its technical skill and plot.

Gould's final novel was The Luck of Rathcoole (1912). Set in New York during George Washington's first administration, the book follows the romance of Mistress Faith Wolcott, also known as Miss Moppet, and her suitor.

Gould published short stories and poems in magazines and newspapers throughout her career. These included Peterson’s Magazine and The Washington Times. For these publications, she often used the pen name of Daisy Ventnor. Some of her poems, such as "Tender and True", were set to music.

== Personal life ==
In 1877, Gould married Nathan Smith Lincoln, a prominent physician in Washington, D.C. The couple were active in Washington society, and Gould organized charitable events. They had two children, journalist G. Gould Lincoln and novelist Natalie Sumner Lincoln. Gould died on August 8, 1921. She was buried in the Oak Hill Cemetery in Washington, D.C.

== Selected works ==
=== Poems ===
- 1869: A Chaplet of Leaves

=== Novels ===
- 1872: Marjorie's Quest
- 1884: Her Washington Season
- 1896: A Genuine Girl
- 1897: An Unwilling Maid
- 1899: A Pretty Tory
- 1905: A Javelin of Fate
- 1912: The Luck of Rathcoole
