= Joan Standing =

English actress (1903–1979)

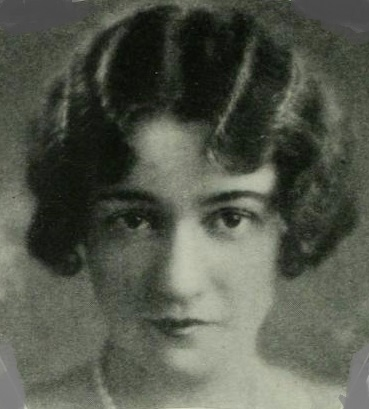
- Joan Standing, 1927
- Born: 21 June 1903; Worcestershire, England, UK
- Died: 3 February 1979 (aged 75); Houston, Texas, U.S.
- Occupation: Actress
- Years active: 1919–1940
- Spouse: Otto Pierce (m. 1927, died 1957)
- Children: 2
- Relatives: Herbert Standing (grandfather); Wyndham Standing (uncle); Sir Guy Standing (uncle); Percy Standing (uncle); Jack Standing (uncle); Kay Hammond (cousin); John Standing (first cousin once removed)

Joan Standing (21 June 1903 – 3 February 1979) was an English actress, best known for playing Nurse Briggs in the 1931 horror film Dracula. She appeared in more than 60 films from 1919 to 1940, with the majority under contract with Metro-Goldwyn Mayer Studios.

== Biography ==
Standing was born into the acting Standing family on 21 June 1903 in Worcestershire, England. She was the niece of the actors Guy Standing (1873–1937), Wyndham Standing (1880–1963) and Percy Standing (1882–1950). She was also the granddaughter of actor Herbert Standing (1846–1923) and cousin to actress Kay Hammond (1909–1980).

As an actress, her first film was The Loves of Letty (1919). Her last film appearance was in Li'l Abner (1940).

Standing married film camera operator Otto Pierce on 26 October 1927 and they had two children. She was widowed on 22 October 1957.

Standing died from cancer on 3 February 1979 in Houston, Harris County, Texas, aged 75. She was cremated at the South Memorial Park Crematory in Pearland, Texas.

== Partial filmography ==
- The Loves of Letty (1919) - Slavey
- The Branding Iron (1920) - Maude Upper
- Silk Hosiery (1920) - Sophia Black
- Lorna Doone (1922) - Gwenny Carfax (uncredited)
- Oliver Twist (1922) - Charlotte
- Hearts Aflame (1923) - Ginger
- The Cricket on the Hearth (1923) - Tillie Slowboy
- Pleasure Mad (1923) - Hulda
- A Noise in Newboro (1923) - Dorothy Mason
- Three Weeks (1924) - Isabella
- Women Who Give (1924) - Sophia Higginboottom
- Happiness (1924) - Jenny
- What Shall I Do? (1924) - Lizzie
- The Beauty Prize (1924) - Lydia Du Bois
- Empty Hearts (1924) - Hilda, the maid
- Greed (1924) - Selina
- The Dancers (1925) - Pringle
- Faint Perfume (1925) - The Hired Girl
- Love on the Rio Grande (1925)
- Ranger of the Big Pines (1925) - Minor Role (uncredited)
- With This Ring (1925) - Cecilie's maid
- Counsel for the Defense (1925) - Printer's Devil
- The Outsider (1926) - Pritchard
- The Skyrocket (1926) - Sharon's Secretary
- Memory Lane (1926) - Maid
- Sandy (1926) - Alice McNeil
- The Little Firebrand (1926) - Miss Smyth
- Lost at Sea (1926) - Olga
- The Campus Flirt (1926) - Harriet Porter
- The First Night (1927) - Mrs. Miller
- Ritzy (1927) - Mary
- The College Hero (1927) - Nellie Kelly
- Beau Sabreur (1928) - Maudie
- Riley of the Rainbow Division (1928) - Mabel
- Home, James (1928) - Iris Elliot
- The Kid's Clever (1929) - A Girl
- The Cohens and Kellys in Atlantic City (1929) - Minor Role (uncredited)
- My Lady's Past (1929) - Maid
- Fashions in Love (1929) - Miss Weller
- The Marriage Playground (1929) - Miss Scopey
- Street of Chance (1930) - Miss Abrams
- Hell's Angels (1930) - Roy's Dancing Partner (uncredited)
- For the Love o' Lil (1930) - Chambermaid
- Extravagance (1930) - Mary - Maid (uncredited)
- A Lady's Morals (1930) - Louise
- Ex-Flame (1930) - Kilmer
- Dracula (1931) - Nurse Briggs
- Never the Twain Shall Meet (1931) - Julia
- Young as You Feel (1931) - Lemuel's Secretary
- The Age for Love (1931) - Eleanor
- Possessed (1931) - Whitney's Secretary (uncredited)
- Emma (1932) - Employment Agency Clerk (uncredited)
- Broken Lullaby (1932) - Flower Shop Girl (uncredited)
- Love Affair (1932) - Jim's Secretary (uncredited)
- American Madness (1932) - Panicked Depositor (uncredited)
- Goldie Gets Along (1933) - The Mayor's Secretary (uncredited)
- Private Detective 62 (1933) - Client with Free (uncredited)
- Jane Eyre (1934) - Daisy
- Broadway Bill (1934) - Brooks' Phone Operator (uncredited)
- Behold My Wife! (1934) - Ms. Smith (uncredited)
- Straight from the Heart (1935) - Mother of Crippled Boy (uncredited)
- The Headline Woman (1935) - Sadie, Chase's Secretary (uncredited)
- Little Lord Fauntleroy (1936) - Dawson (uncredited)
- Grand Ole Opry (1940) - Woman (uncredited)
- Colorado (1940) - Saloon Reader (uncredited)
- Li'l Abner (1940) - Kitty Hoops
