= Percy Standing =

English actor (1877–1953)

Percy Darrell Standing
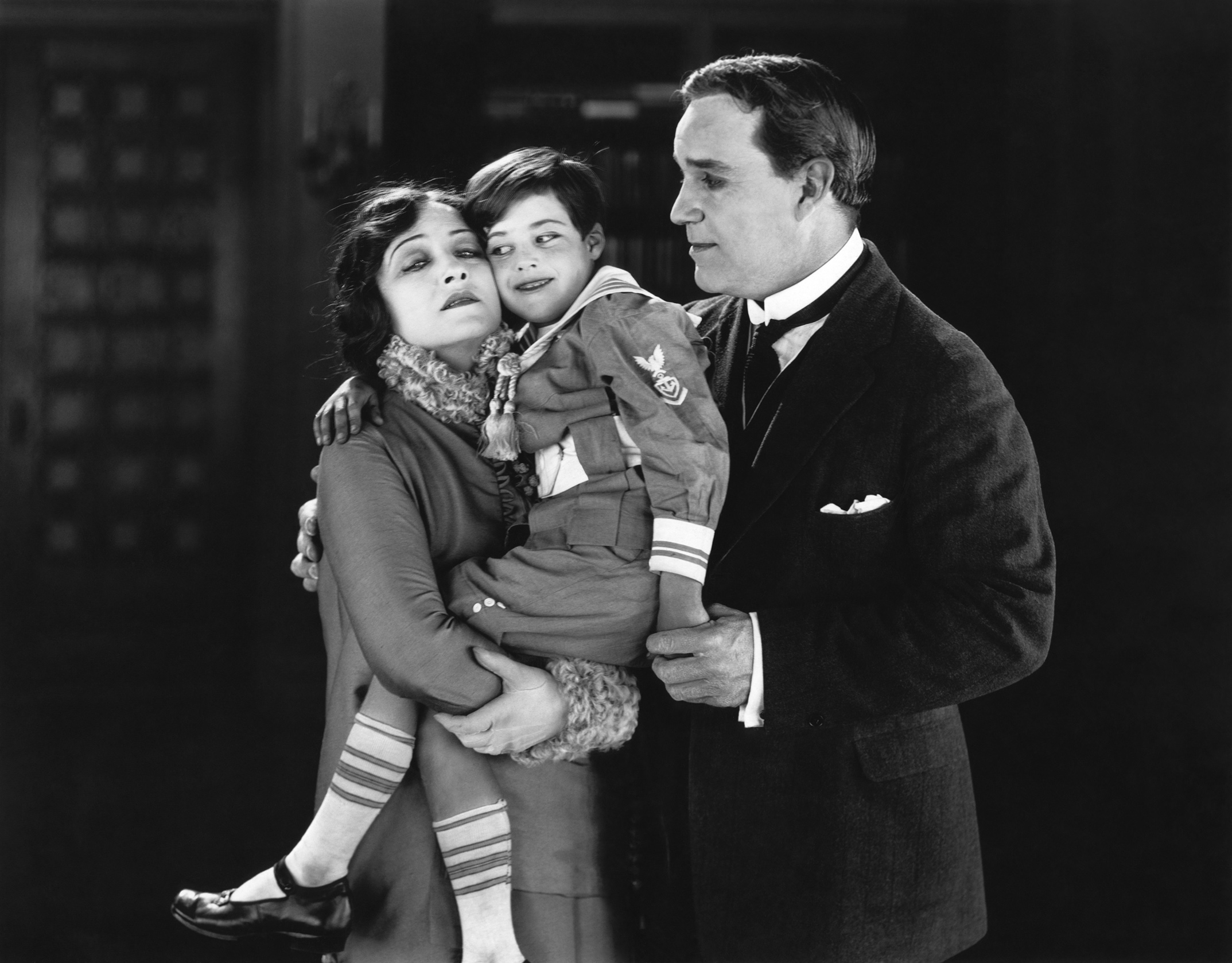
- Standing (right) with Pauline Frederick and little Frankie Lee in Bonds of Love, 1919
- Born: 10 May 1877; London, England
- Died: 1 March 1953 (aged 75); London, England
- Resting place: Abney Park Cemetery, London, England
- Occupation: Actor
- Years active: 1915–1934
- Parent: Herbert Standing (father)
- Relatives: Jack Standing (brother); Guy Standing (brother); Wyndham Standing (brother); Joan Standing (niece); Kay Hammond (niece); John Standing (great nephew)

Percy Darrell Standing (1877 – 1953) was an English film actor of the silent era. His film roles include the Creature in the second screen adaptation of Frankenstein, Life Without Soul (1915) and Professor Moriarty opposite Eille Norwood's Sherlock Holmes in The Final Problem (1923). He was part of an acting family which included his father Herbert Standing, and brothers Sir Guy Standing, Wyndham Standing, Jack Standing and Herbert Standing Jr.

== Selected filmography ==
- Life Without Soul (1915)
- My Four Years in Germany (1918)
- To the Highest Bidder (1918)
- Should a Husband Forgive? (1919)
- The Great Day (1920)
- The Island of Wisdom (1920)
- Appearances (1921)
- The Mystery Road (1921)
- Sheer Bluff (1922)
- A Gipsy Cavalier (1923)
- The Harbour Lights (1923)
- The Final Problem (1923)
- Aaron's Rod (1923)
- Fires of Fate (1923)
- Becket (1924)
- Harmony Heaven (1930)
- The Flame of Love (1930)
- Colonel Blood (1934)
