= Cupid Forecloses =

1919 silent film by David Smith

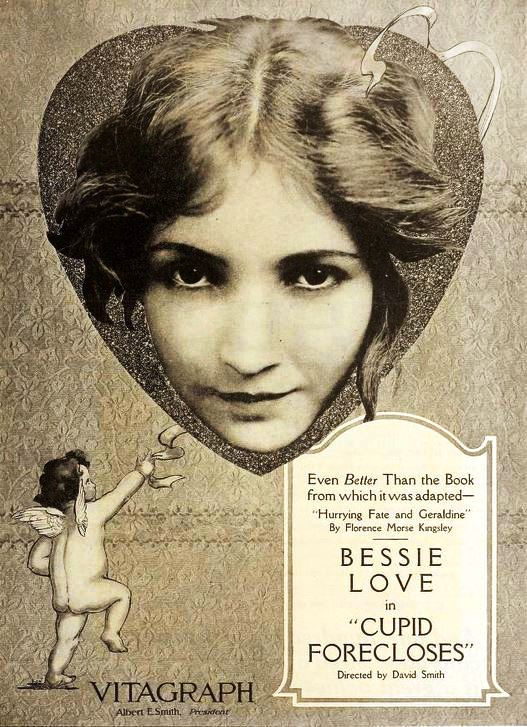
- Advertisement from Motion Picture News
- Directed by: David Smith
- Written by: Stanley Olmstead; Edward J. Montagne
- Based on: Hurrying Fate and Geraldine (novel) by Florence Morse Kingsley
- Starring: Bessie Love; Wallace MacDonald
- Cinematography: Clyde De Vinna
- Production company: Vitagraph Studios
- Release date: July 12, 1919 (U.S.)
- Running time: 5 reels
- Country: United States
- Language: Silent (English intertitles)

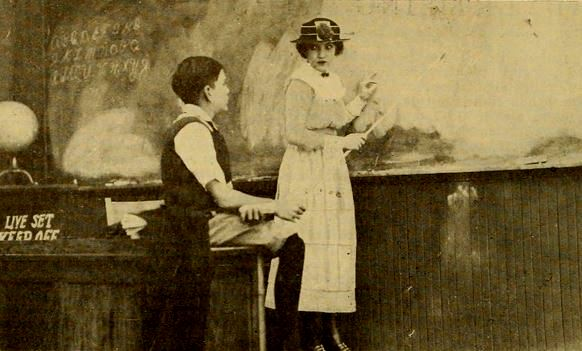
Unidentified actor and Bessie Love

Cupid Forecloses is a 1919 American silent comedy film starring Bessie Love and Wallace MacDonald. It was directed by David Smith and produced by Vitagraph Studios. It was based on the popular novel Hurrying Fate and Geraldine by Florence Morse Kingsley. The film has been preserved at the British Film Institute and American Film Institute.

== Plot ==
Geraldine Farleigh, a timid village schoolteacher, supports her family and must pay off her late father's debt to Bruce Cartwright. She falls in love with the man she believes is a lawyer representing Cartwright, who turns out to be Cartwright himself.

== Cast ==
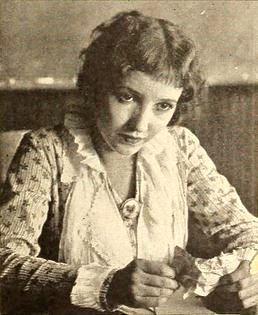
Bessie Love as schoolteacher Geraldine Farleigh

- Bessie Love as Geraldine Farleigh
- Dorothea Wolbert as Mrs. Farleigh
- Wallace MacDonald as Bruce Cartwright
- Frank Hayes as Oliver Brown
- Jim Donnelly as Jim Connors
- Aggie Herring as Mrs. Connors
- Jake Abram as Rufe Tinker
- Anne Schaefer as Aunt Adelaide
- Gordon Griffith as Nat Farleigh
- Otto Lederer as The Postmaster
