= Dorothy Hammond =

English actress (1876–1950)

- Hammond circa 1900
- Born: Dorothy Frances Plaskitt; 1876; London, England
- Died: 23 November 1950 (aged 73–74); Buckinghamshire, England
- Occupation: Actress
- Years active: 1897–1936
- Spouse: Guy Standing (m. 1907; died 1937)
- Children: 3, including Kay Hammond
- Relatives: John Standing (grandson)

Dorothy Hammond, Lady Standing (born Dorothy Frances Plaskitt; 1876 – 1950) was an English actress.

== Life ==
Hammond was born Dorothy Frances Plaskitt in 1876, the daughter of Lydia (née Webb) and Joshua Plaskitt.

Hammond married actor Guy Standing in 1907. She largely retired from acting following her marriage. The couple had three children: Guy, Michael, and Dorothy Katherine, known professionally as Kay Hammond.

== Career ==
Hammond appeared in the West End as Annis Marsh in The Princess and the Butterfly (1897), in Macbeth (1898) and in All Changes Here!, produced by Charles Frohman. Frohman was known for his ability to develop talent and Hammond appeared in further Frohman productions on Broadway between 1902 and 1908. She toured the United States in 1914 as Ethel in Peg o' My Heart. Hammond also appeared in four films, silent films Hoodman Blind (1913) and Across the Continent (1913, credited as Mrs Guy Standing) as well as the British "talkies", Jubilee Window (1935) and Nothing Like Publicity (1936).

She appeared on stage with Herbert Beerbohm Tree, George Alexander and Mrs Patrick Campbell.

== Death ==
Hammond died in London on 23 November 1950.

== Media ==
The Ogden's Tobacco Company issued cigarette cards with their cigarettes. In 1900 Hammond appeared in the series entitled Actresses and Stage Artistes.
