= Babbitt (1924 film) =

1924 silent film

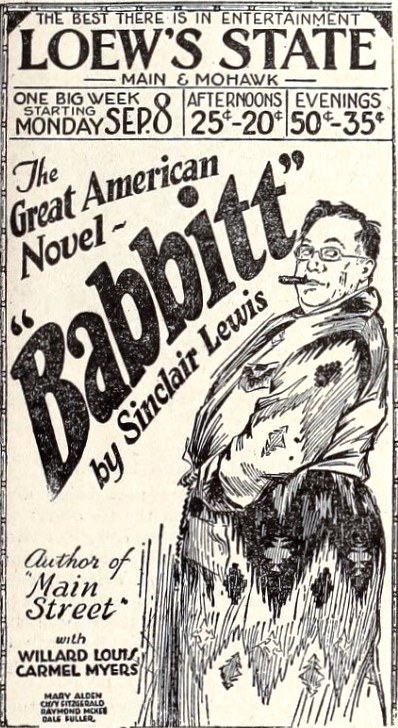
- Advertisement
- Directed by: Harry Beaumont
- Written by: Dorothy Farnum
- Based on: Babbitt by Sinclair Lewis
- Starring: Willard Louis; Mary Alden; Carmel Myers
- Cinematography: David Abel
- Production company: Warner Bros.
- Distributed by: Warner Bros.
- Release date: June 15, 1924
- Running time: 80 minutes
- Country: United States
- Language: Silent (English intertitles)

Babbitt is a 1924 American silent drama film directed by Harry Beaumont and starring Willard Louis, Mary Alden, and Carmel Myers. It is based on the 1922 novel of the same title by Sinclair Lewis, later also adapted into a 1934 sound film.

== Cast ==
- Willard Louis as George F. Babbitt
- Mary Alden as Mrs. Myra Babbitt
- Carmel Myers as Tanis Judique
- Raymond McKee as Theodore Roosevelt Babbitt
- Maxine Elliott Hicks as Verona Babbitt
- Virginia Loomis as Tina Babbitt
- Robert Randall as Paul Reisling
- Cissy Fitzgerald as Mrs. Zilla Reisling
- Gertrude Olmstead as Eunice Littlefield
- Lucien Littlefield as Edward Littlefield
- Dale Fuller as Tillie
- Kathleen Myers as Miss McGoun
- Frona Hale as Mrs. Littlefield
- Michael Dark as Chum Frink
- Charles McHugh as Virgil Gunch
- Malcolm Denny as Undetermined Secondary Role (uncredited)

== Preservation ==
With no prints of Babbitt located in any film archives, it is a lost film.

== Bibliography ==
- Robert B. Connelly. The Silents: Silent Feature Films, 1910-36, Volume 40, Issue 2. December Press, 1998.
