= Car 99 =

1935 film by Charles Barton

- Directed by: Charles Barton
- Screenplay by: Karl Detzer; C. Gardner Sullivan
- Produced by: Bayard Veiller
- Starring: Fred MacMurray; Ann Sheridan; Guy Standing; Marina Koshetz; Dean Jagger; William Frawley; Frank Craven
- Cinematography: William C. Mellor
- Edited by: Eda Warren
- Production company: Paramount Pictures
- Distributed by: Paramount Pictures
- Release date: March 2, 1935
- Running time: 67 minutes
- Country: United States
- Language: English

Car 99 is a 1935 American thriller film directed by Charles Barton and written by Karl Detzer and C. Gardner Sullivan. The film stars Fred MacMurray, Ann Sheridan, Guy Standing, Marina Koshetz, Dean Jagger, William Frawley and Frank Craven. The film was released on March 2, 1935, by Paramount Pictures.

== Plot ==
A story of the Michigan State Police and the strong sense of loyalty and duty it instills in its men. It follows the career of a newly inducted rookie, Ross Martin, who has joined the force at the urging of his sweetheart, Mary Adams. Martin soon distinguishes himself by his bravery in the apprehension of criminals. But when the leader of a gang of bank robbers falls into his hands and then escapes, because of carelessness on Martin's part, he is suspended from the force.

== Cast ==
- Fred MacMurray as Trooper Ross Martin
- Ann Sheridan as Mary Adams
- Guy Standing as John Vilker
- Marina Koshetz as Nan Vilker
- Dean Jagger as Trooper Jim Burton
- William Frawley as Training Sgt. Barrel
- Frank Craven as Sheriff Peter Arnot
- Nora Cecil as Granny Adams
- Charles C. Wilson as Trooper Captain Ryan
- Joe Sawyer as Whitey
- Mack Gray as Smoke
- Eddy Chandler as Trooper Haynes
- Robert Kent as Trooper Blatzky
- John Howard as Trooper Carney
- Alfred Delcambre as Trooper Jamison
- Russell Hopton as Dispatch Operator Harper
- Howard Wilson as Dutch
