= Guy Standing (actor) =

British actor (1873–1937)

Sir Guy Standing KBE CBE
- Standing in 1906
- Born: 1 September 1873; London, England
- Died: 24 February 1937 (aged 63); Hollywood Hills, California, U.S.
- Years active: 1895–1937
- Spouses: Isabelle Urquhart (m. 1893; div. 1899/1900); Blanche Burton (m. 19??; div. 19??); Dorothy Hammond (m. 1907)
- Children: 3, including Kay Hammond
- Parent: Herbert Standing (father)
- Relatives: Jack Standing (brother); Percy Standing (brother); Wyndham Standing (brother); John Standing (grandson)

Sir Guy Standing (1 September 1873 – 24 February 1937) was an English-American actor. After fighting in the British Navy in World War I, he became a noted actor in theater and then subsequently in pre-code Hollywood. He is known mainly for his roles playing authority figures, such as Colonel Stone in Lives of a Bengal Lancer. He was the son of Herbert Standing, and a member of the Standing family of actors.

== Biography ==
Standing was born on 1 September 1873 in London. He was the son of Herbert Standing (1846–1923), a noted actor from the stage and in silent films, and a nephew of the operatic baritone William T. Carleton. In the 1891 census, he was registered as a stage actor in London. In 1892, he came to New York, where he had his first notable stage appearance in November 1892 at Koster & Bial's Music Hall, alongside Mrs. Bernard Beere. He joined Loie Fuller's theatre company. In 1893, Standing was hired by Charles Frohman with whom he went on tour, starring in Sowing the Wind. In 1897, he appeared in The Little Minister. He worked on Broadway from 1897 to 1899, where he became a favourite with audiences. In 1907, he was joint star alongside Theodore Roberts in The Right of Way at Wallack's Theatre on Broadway. By 1910, Standing had become a well-known stage actor.

In 1911, Standing lived in Chelsea, London. Throughout the First World War, he served in the Royal Naval Volunteer Reserve, reaching the rank of commander. He was seconded to MI6, but transferred to the Ministry of Information in December 1917. In 1918, he was part of the British War Mission to the United States. For this service, he was made a Commander of the Order of the British Empire (CBE) in 1918 and raised to Knight Commander (KBE) in the 1919 New Year Honours.

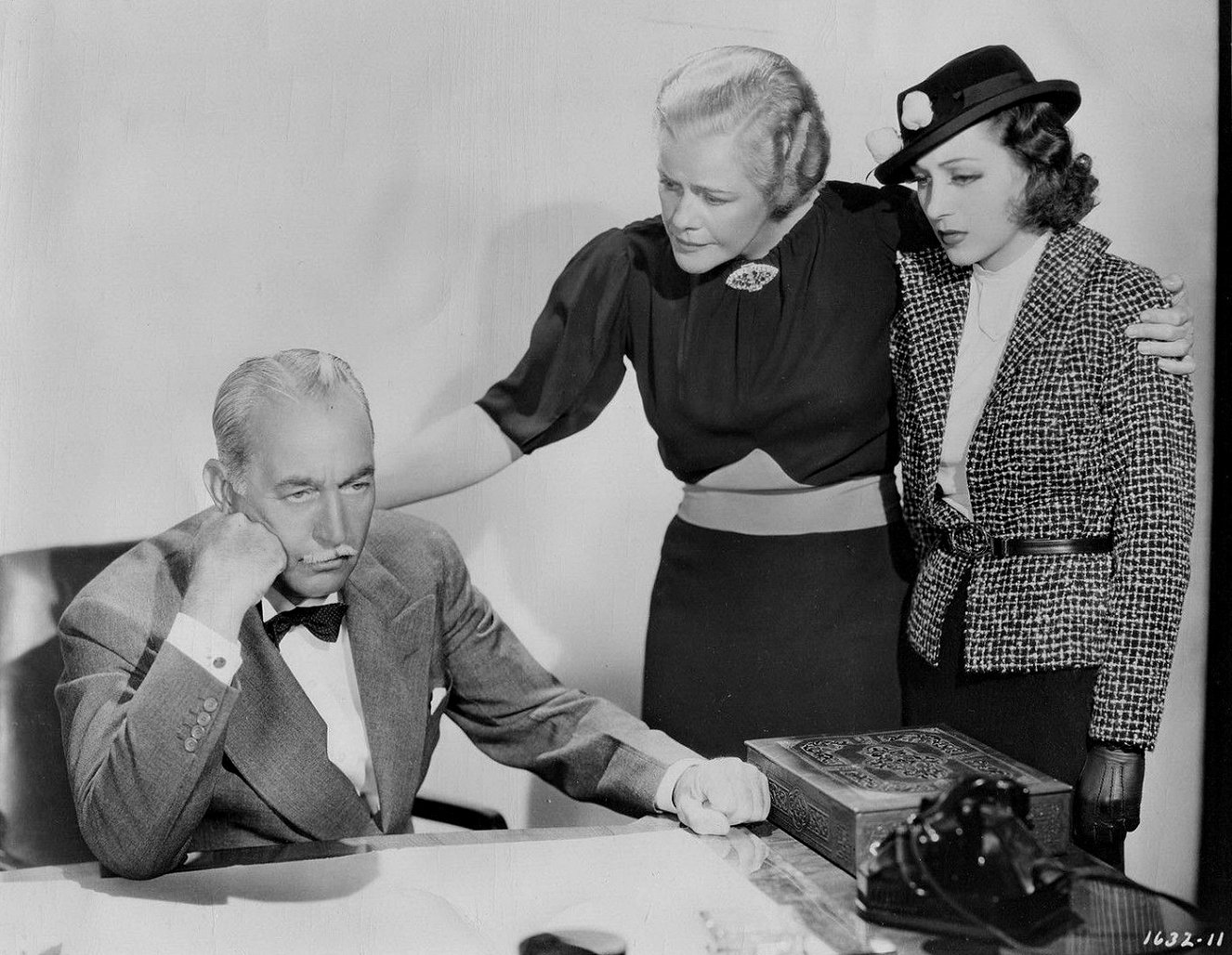
Guy Standing sitting next to Janet Beecher (center) and Frances Drake (right), in a production still from I'd Give My Life (1936)

After becoming a noted actor in American and British theatre, he moved to Hollywood in the early 1930s appearing in Paramount films. His best-known role is probably that of Colonel Stone, autocratic father of Lieutenant Stone (played by Richard Cromwell), in Henry Hathaway's Lives of a Bengal Lancer (1935).

Guy Standing's brothers Jack Standing, Herbert Standing Jr., Percy Standing and Wyndham Standing were also actors, as was his first wife Isabelle Urquhart, and his third wife and mother of his three children, Dorothy Hammond (née Plaskitt), his son Guy Standing Jr. and his daughter, Kay Hammond (née Dorothy Katherine Standing) and grandson John Standing. His son, Michael Standing (died 1 December 1984), was a cricket commentator for BBC and live radio commentator, known particularly for his "Standing on the Corner" slot in In Town Tonight.

Though legend holds that Standing died of a rattlesnake or spider bite, he died of a heart attack on 24 February 1937. Reportedly, right after he made the claim "I never felt better", he collapsed to the floor in pain, dying shortly after. He was interred at Grand View Memorial Park Cemetery in Glendale, California.

== Filmography ==
Year	Title	Role	Notes
1933	The Eagle and the Hawk	Major Dunham	
1933	The Story of Temple Drake	Grandfather Judge Drake	Film is sometimes credited for the increased enforcement of the Hays Code after 1934
1933	Midnight Club	Commissioner Hope	
1933	Cradle Song	Don Jose - the Doctor	
1933	Hell and High Water	Rear Admiral	
1934	Death Takes a Holiday	Duke Lambert	
1934	The Witching Hour	Judge Martin Prentice	
1934	Double Door	Mortimer Neff	
1934	Now and Forever	Felix Evans	
1935	The Lives of a Bengal Lancer	Colonel Tom Stone	Film was nominated for 7 Academy Awards and won one for best assistant director
1935	Car 99	Professor Anthony	
1935	Annapolis Farewell	Cmdr. Fitzhugh	
1935	The Big Broadcast of 1936	Doctor	
1936	Palm Springs	Captain Smyth	
1936	The Return of Sophie Lang	Max Bernard	
1936	I'd Give My Life	Governor John Bancroft	
1936	Lloyd's of London	John Julius Angerstein	
1937	Bulldog Drummond Escapes	Col. Reginald Nielson	Standing's final film role
