= One Touch of Sin =

1917 film by Richard Stanton

- Directed by: Richard Stanton
- Written by: L. Genez
- Produced by: William Fox
- Starring: Gladys Brockwell; Jack Standing; Willard Louis
- Cinematography: Dal Clawson; Devereaux Jennings; George Richter
- Production company: Fox Film
- Distributed by: Fox Film
- Release date: January 29, 1917
- Running time: 50 minutes
- Country: United States
- Languages: Silent; English intertitles

One Touch of Sin is a 1917 American silent drama film directed by Richard Stanton and starring Gladys Brockwell, Jack Standing and Willard Louis.

== Cast ==
- Gladys Brockwell as Mary Livingston
- Jack Standing as Richard Mallaby
- Willard Louis as Watt Tabor
- Sedley Brown as Old Livingston
- Carrie Clark Ward as The Widow
- Frankie Lee as Little Billy
- Charles Edler as Rd
- Jack McDonald as Hard-luck Danver

== Bibliography ==
- Solomon, Aubrey. The Fox Film Corporation, 1915-1935: A History and Filmography. McFarland, 2011.
