= Life Without Soul =

- Lobby card
- Directed by: Joseph W. Smiley
- Written by: Jesse J. Goldburg
- Produced by: John I. Dudley
- Starring: Percy Standing; George De Carlton
- Distributed by: Ocean Pictures
- Release date: November 21, 1915
- Running time: 70 minutes
- Country: United States
- Languages: Silent film English intertitles

Life Without Soul (1915) is a lost horror film, directed by Joseph W. Smiley and written by Jesse J. Goldburg. This film is an adaptation of Mary Shelley's 1818 Gothic novel Frankenstein; or, The Modern Prometheus. The film is about a doctor who creates a soulless man. In the end, it turns out that a young man has dreamed the events of the film after falling asleep reading Shelley's novel.

This version is considered a lost film and the second film version of Frankenstein. The first version was the Edison Manufacturing Company's 12-minute short film Frankenstein (1910), written and directed by J. Searle Dawley.

== Production ==
This full-length film, presented in five parts, was produced by the Ocean Film Corporation and stars English-born actor Percy Darrell Standing, who appears as the 'Brute Man' with minimal makeup. The plot centers on the Brute Man, who murders the sister of his creator, Dr. William Frawley, on her wedding night. Frawley then pursues his creation across Europe, ultimately shooting and killing it before dying of exhaustion himself. The narrative is framed as a story being read from a book. The film was reissued in 1916 by the Raver Film Corporation with added scientific documentary footage detailing the reproduction methods of fish.

== Cast ==
- Percy Standing as The Creation / Brute Man
- George De Carlton as Frankenstein's Father
- Lucy Cotton as Elizabeth Lavenza
- Pauline Curley as Claudia Frawley
- Jack Hopkins as Henry Claridge
- David McCauley as Victor Frawley As A Child
- Violet De Biccari as Elizabeth Lavenza As A Child
- William A. Cohill as Dr. William Frawley

== See also ==
- List of lost films
