= Diamond Horseshoe =

1945 film by George Seaton

- Directed by: George Seaton
- Written by: George Seaton; Kenyon Nicholson (play)
- Produced by: William Perlberg
- Starring: Betty Grable; Dick Haymes
- Cinematography: Ernest Palmer
- Edited by: Robert L. Simpson
- Music by: Herbert W. Spencer (uncredited)
- Distributed by: 20th Century Fox
- Release date: May 2, 1945
- Running time: 104 minutes
- Country: United States
- Language: English
- Budget: $2.6 million
- Box office: $3,150,000 (US)

Diamond Horseshoe (also billed as Billy Rose's Diamond Horseshoe) is a 1945 American musical film starring Betty Grable, Dick Haymes and William Gaxton (in his final feature film role), directed and written by George Seaton, and released by 20th Century Fox. It was filmed in Technicolor in Billy Rose's Diamond Horseshoe, a nightclub located in the basement of the Paramount Hotel. The film's original score is by Harry Warren and Mack Gordon, introducing the pop and jazz standard "The More I See You".

== Plot ==
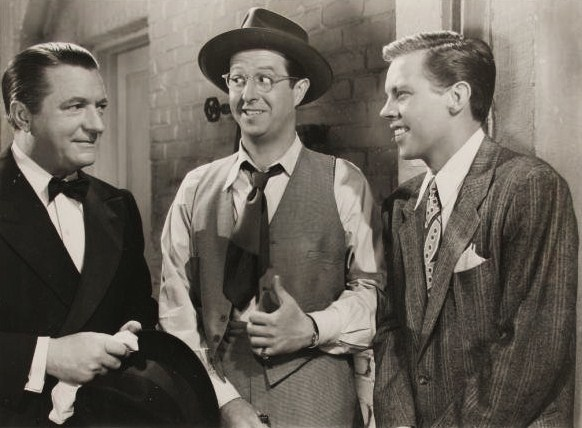
Publicity Still from Diamond Horseshoe featuring from left to right William Gaxton, Phil Silvers, and Dick Haymes

Joe Davis Sr. performs in a big nightclub called Billy Rose's Diamond Horseshoe in the Paramount Hotel in Manhattan. He is visited by his son Joe Jr. who is a medical student. Joe Jr. tells his father that he wants to be in show business, much to his father's disapproval. Nevertheless, Joe Sr. gives his son a job at his club where Joe Jr. then becomes smitten with Bonnie Collins, the club's headlining act.

Joe Sr. is spending so much time worrying about his son that he starts to neglect his own girlfriend Claire. Claire promises to give Bonnie a mink coat if she pretends to like and go out with Joe Jr., so that Joe Sr. will pay more attention to her. Things take a complicated turn when Bonnie actually does fall in love with Joe Jr. and they get married, again much to his father's disapproval.

== Cast ==
- Betty Grable as Bonnie Collins
- Dick Haymes as Joe Davis Jr.
- William Gaxton as Joe Davis Sr.
- Beatrice Kay as Claire Williams
- Phil Silvers as Blinkie Miller
- Margaret Dumont as Mrs. Standish
- Carmen Cavallaro as Himself
- Willie Solar as doubletalking Singing Clown (uncredited)
- Eddie Acuff as Clarinet Player
- Sam Ash (actor) as Extra at Footlight Club
- Charles Coleman as Majordomo
- Hal K. Dawson as Sam Carter
- Cathy Downs as Miss Cream Puff
- Dick Elliott as Footlight Club Waiter
- Franklyn Farnum as Extra at Nightclub Table
- Jean Fenwick as Lady Be-Good
- Bess Flowers as Duchess of Duke
- Gladys Gale as Chorine
- Edward Gargan as Grogan, stage hand
- Mack Gray as Mack, the waiter
- Reed Hadley as Intern
- Bud Jamison as Footlight Club patron
- Phyllis Kennedy as Frank's nightclub girlfriend
- Mildred Kornman as Chorine
- Eddie Laughton as Eddie
- Barbara Lawrence as Blonde in nightclub
- Julie London as Chorine (uncredited)
- George Melford as Pop, stage doorman
- Eve Miller as Chorine
- Frank Mills as Waiter
- Lee Phelps as Bartender at the Diamond Horseshoe
- Bob Reeves as Doorman at Club 21
- Phillips Tead as Waiter with cart
- Ray Teal as Tough Customer at Footlight Club

== Background ==
Diamond Horseshoe is a remake of two previous films derived from the same story, The Barker (1928) and Hoop-La (1933). Grable played the role previously played by Dorothy Mackaill in The Barker and Clara Bow in Hoop-La. All are based on the 1928 play The Barker by Kenyon Nicholson.

In the chorus line, an 18-year old Julie London makes an unbilled appearance in her first or second major studio film. During a production number, the bizarre double-talk comic and screeching singer Willie Solar (1891–1956) has a rare onscreen cameo as a filmed record of his stage act.

== Reception ==
The film was very successful when it was released, but because of its high cost struggled to make a profit. Grable's other picture that year The Dolly Sisters was one of Fox's highest-grossing films of 1945.
