= Fanchon the Cricket =

Fanchon, the Cricket
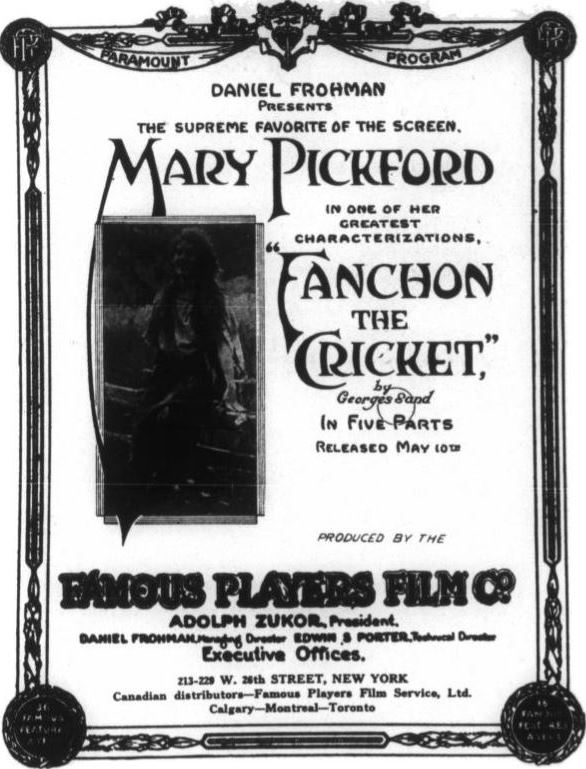
- Newspaper advertisement
- Directed by: James Kirkwood
- Written by: James Kirkwood (scenario); Frances Marion (scenario)
- Based on: La Petite Fadette; 1849 novel by George Sand
- Produced by: Daniel Frohman
- Starring: Mary Pickford; Jack Standing
- Cinematography: Edward Wynard
- Production company: Famous Players Film Company
- Distributed by: Paramount Pictures
- Release date: May 10, 1915 (United States)
- Running time: 5 reels
- Country: United States
- Language: Silent (English intertitles)

Fanchon the Cricket is a 1915 American silent drama film produced by Famous Players Film Company and distributed by Paramount Pictures. It is based on a novel, La Petite Fadette by George Sand. It was directed by James Kirkwood and stars Mary Pickford, at the time working for Adolph Zukor and Daniel Frohman. A previous film version of the story was released in 1912 by IMP (later Universal Pictures) and directed by Herbert Brenon.

Fanchon the Cricket is the only film to feature all three Pickford siblings: Mary (in the lead role), Lottie Pickford and Jack Pickford. Milton Berle, Fred Astaire and Adele Astaire are also listed among the cast. Astaire biographer Tim Satchell maintains that the film is the only one to feature the dancing duo of Fred and Adele Astaire. Fred Astaire later said he had no recollection of working on the film. All three roles have yet to be positively confirmed.

For years it was known only to survive as an incomplete nitrate print held by the British Film Institute, but a nitrate duplicate was found within La Cinémathèque française in 2012. The organizations partnered with The Mary Pickford Foundation and hired L’ Immagine Ritrovata Laboratory of Bologna, Italy to photochemically and digitally restore the film to 4k high definition. The missing English intertitles were reconstructed by translating the French versions found on the dupe. The Pickford foundation also commissioned a new score to accompany the reconstructed film (released in 2018), which was composed by Julian Ducatenzeiler and Andy Gladbach.

== Plot summary ==
Fanchon the Cricket (1915)

Fanchon is a free-spirited young lady who lives in the woods with her grandmother. Judging by the clothing, the story takes place in the 1700s. The townspeople suspect that she and her grandmother are witches.

After saving a young boy from drowning, they fall in love. She tells him to wait a year and if he still feels the same way they will marry. He returns in a year to attempt to marry her but she will not at the time as her grandmother is gravely ill. Her grandmother passes away and the young man falls ill. However, Fanchon helps to restore his health, thus ensuring a happy ending for the young couple.

== Cast ==
- Mary Pickford as Fanchon
- Jack Standing as Landry Barbeau
- Lottie Pickford as Madelon
- Gertrude Norman as Old Fadette
- Russell Bassett as Landry's Father
- Richard Lee as Didier
- Jack Pickford as the unnamed bully

== Release ==
The film was released in New Zealand in late 1915, playing in Wellington at the People's Picture Palace in mid-December, and playing through January in Greytown.
