= Kay Hammond =

English actress (1909–1980)

- Born: Dorothy Katherine Standing; 18 February 1909; London, England
- Died: 4 May 1980 (aged 71); Brighton, East Sussex, England
- Education: Royal Academy of Dramatic Art
- Occupation: Actress
- Years active: 1927–1961
- Spouse(s): Sir Ronald Leon 3rd Bt (m.1932–div.1946); Sir John Clements (m.1946)
- Children: 2, including John Standing
- Parent(s): Guy Standing; Dorothy Hammond
- Relatives: Joan Standing (cousin); Wyndham Standing (uncle); Jack Standing (uncle); Percy Standing (uncle); Herbert Standing (grandfather)

Dorothy Katherine Standing, Lady Clements (18 February 1909 – 4 May 1980), known professionally as Kay Hammond, was an English stage and film actress.

== Family ==
Kay Hammond was born in London, England as Dorothy Katherine Standing, the daughter of Sir Guy Standing and his wife, Dorothy Hammond (Dorothy Plaskitt). Her grandfather was Herbert Standing (1846–1923) and her uncles were Wyndham, Jack, and Percy Darrell Standing.

== Career ==
She studied at RADA and first appeared on the London stage in 1927. Her most famous role was that of Elvira in Noël Coward's Blithe Spirit, which she played in the original stage production. She reprised her role in the 1945 film version opposite Rex Harrison, Margaret Rutherford and Constance Cummings.

She appeared as a guest of Roy Plomley on Desert Island Discs on 25 February 1951.

== Personal life ==
Hammond's first husband was baronet Sir Ronald George Leon. Their sons were John Ronald Leon (the actor John Standing) and Timothy George Leon. Her second husband was the stage actor Sir John Clements.

== Death ==
Kay Hammond died in Brighton, aged 71, from undisclosed causes, on 4 May 1980. She was cremated and her ashes scattered in the memorial garden at Downs Crematorium, Brighton, East Sussex

== Filmography ==
| Year | Title | Role | Notes |
|---|---|---|---|
| 1930 | Children of Chance | Joyce | |
| 1931 | Fascination | Kay | |
| 1931 | A Night in Montmartre | Margot | |
| 1931 | Almost a Divorce | Maisie | |
| 1931 | Carnival | Helen | |
| 1931 | Out of the Blue | Angela Tucker | |
| 1932 | The Third String | Hebe Tucker | |
| 1932 | A Night Like This | Mimi - Cocktail Shaker | uncredited |
| 1932 | Nine till Six | Beatrice | |
| 1932 | Money Means Nothing | Angel | |
| 1932 | Sally Bishop | Janet Hallard | |
| 1933 | Yes, Madam | Pansy Beresford | |
| 1933 | Bitter Sweet | Gussi | |
| 1933 | Sleeping Car | Simone | |
| 1933 | Britannia of Billingsgate | Pearl Bolton | |
| 1933 | The Umbrella | Mabel | |
| 1934 | Bypass to Happiness | Dinah | |
| 1936 | Two on a Doorstep | Jill Day | |
| 1941 | Jeannie | Margaret | |
| 1945 | Blithe Spirit | Elvira Condomine | |
| 1949 | Call of the Blood | Dr. Anne Lester | |
| 1953 | Henry V | Princess Katherine | TV movie |
| 1961 | Five Golden Hours | Martha | final film role |

== Selected stage credits ==
- Can the Leopard...? by Ronald Jeans (1931)
- Hollywood Holiday by John Van Druten (1931)
- French Without Tears by Terence Rattigan (1938)
- The Happy Marriage by John Clements (1952)
- The Little Glass Clock by Hugh Mills (1954)
