= Spaghetti and Lottery =

1915 film

- Directed by: Will Louis
- Written by: Vincente DePascale
- Produced by: Arthur Hotaling; Siegmund Lubin
- Starring: Willard Louis
- Distributed by: General Film Company
- Release date: January 16, 1915
- Running time: split reel
- Country: United States
- Language: Silent with English intertitles

Spaghetti and Lottery is a 1915 American short comedy film featuring Oliver Hardy. It was released on a split reel with Mr. Stubb's Pen.

== Plot ==
This plot summary was published in The Moving Picture World for January 9, 1915:

Antonio and Pascale, well known in little Italy, as a couple of harmless fellows, who would rather get a little easy money easy than a lot of hard cash hard, discover it Is time to buy the policy on their lottery. They manage to get enough to buy the much-coveted prize, when the odor of spaghetti from the nearby restaurant reminds them that It is also time for eats. Being now penniless, they decide to try it on their nerve, so over to the restaurant they go. They order the largest platter of spaghetti ever ordered In the place. Their ridiculous actions cause the other guests to laugh. Being unaccustomed to such Insults they at once show their wounded feelings by hurling spaghetti at the offenders. In a short time there Is a general fight, and Antonio and Pascale are compelled to run away to save their lives. They are finally caught and are about to fare badly when the appearance of the policy man with the money won by the lucky number on their ticket enables them to square up the damages and they are once more happy.

== Cast ==
- Will Louis as Antonio
- Oliver Hardy as Cook (as Babe Hardy)
- Vincente DePascale as Pascale
- Royal Byron as Brizzi
- Harry Lorraine as Proprietor
- Harry Rice as Waiter
- Pete Bell as Waiter

== See also ==
- List of American films of 1915
- Oliver Hardy filmography
