= Willard Louis =

American actor (1882–1926)

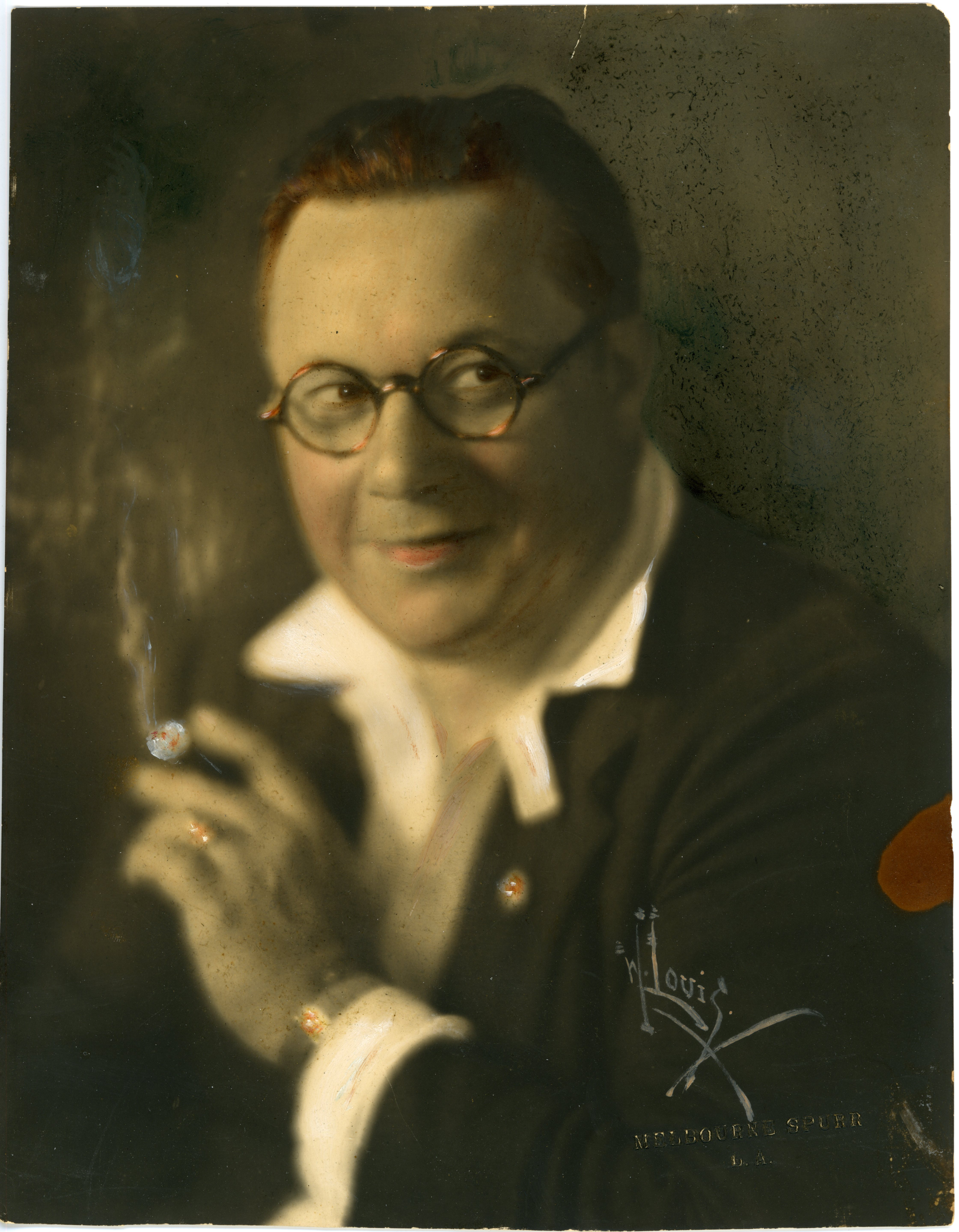
- Willard Louis
- Born: Willard Louis Smith; April 19, 1882; San Francisco, California, U.S.
- Died: July 22, 1926 (aged 44); Glendale, California, U.S.
- Occupation: Actor
- Years active: 1911-1926

Willard Louis (April 19, 1882 – July 22, 1926) was an American stage and film actor of the silent era. He appeared in more than 80 films between 1911 and 1926. He was born in San Francisco, California.

Louis had an art studio before he became an actor at age 20. He acted on stage for four years before he began making films. In addition to his work in dramatic films, Louis performed in comedic roles. In 1926, he signed a five-year contract with Warner Bros., with some of the proposed films having him co-starring with Louise Fazenda.

Louis died of typhoid fever and pneumonia in Glendale, California, aged 44.

== Partial filmography ==
- Spaghetti and Lottery (1915)
- The Undertaker's Daughter (1915)
- A Man of Sorrow (1916)
- The Man from Bitter Roots (1916)
- The Battle of Hearts (1916)
- The Fires of Conscience (1916)
- The Island of Desire (1917)
- The Book Agent (1917)
- A Tale of Two Cities (1917)
- Madame Du Barry (1917)
- A Branded Soul (1917)
- To Honor and Obey (1917)
- One Touch of Sin (1917)
- The Unpainted Woman (1919)
- Love Insurance (1919)
- The Loves of Letty (1919)
- The Scarlet Shadow (1919)
- What Am I Bid? (1919)
- Going Some (1920)
- The Great Accident (1920)
- Dollars and Sense (1920)
- Madame X (1920)
- A Slave of Vanity (1920)
- Moonlight and Honeysuckle (1921)
- Robin Hood (1922)
- Only a Shop Girl (1922)
- Vanity Fair (1923)
- McGuire of the Mounted (1923)
- The French Doll (1923)
- The Marriage Market (1923)
- Her Marriage Vow (1924)
- A Lady of Quality (1924)
- Daddies (1924)
- Three Women (1924)
- Babbitt (1924)
- Beau Brummel (1924)
- The Lover of Camille (1924)
- Don't Doubt Your Husband (1924)
- A Broadway Butterfly (1925)
- Eve's Lover (1925)
- The Man Without a Conscience (1925)
- Kiss Me Again (1925)
- Hogan's Alley (1925)
- Three Weeks in Paris (1925)
- His Secretary (1925)
- The Love Toy (1926)
- Madamoiselle Modiste (1926)
- The Shamrock Handicap (1926)
- Don Juan (1926)
- The Honeymoon Express (1926)
- A Certain Young Man (1927) (*uncredited; posthumous performance)
