= Jack Standing =

English-American actor (1886–1917)

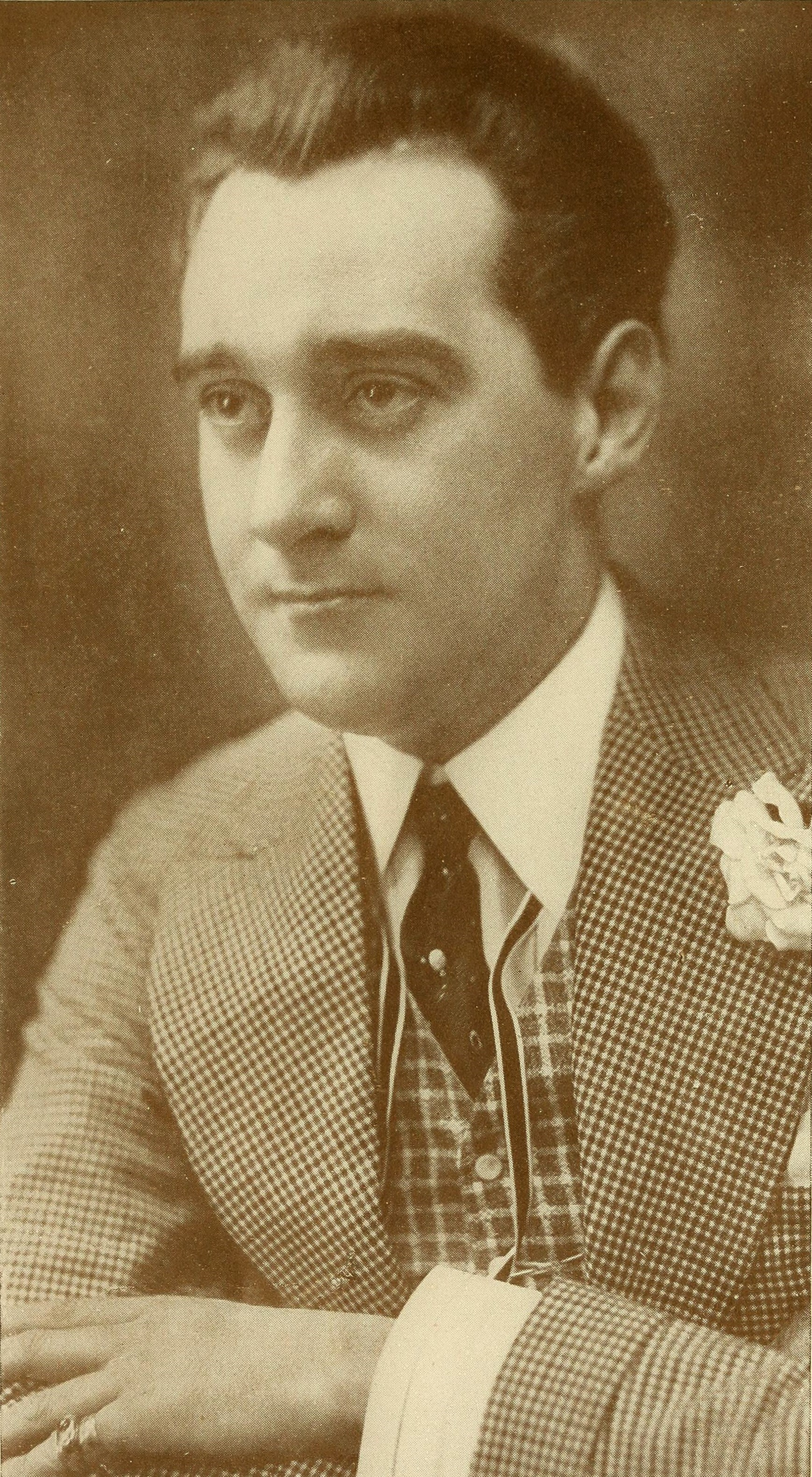
- Standing in 1915
- Born: 10 February 1886; London, England, UK
- Died: 25 October 1917 (aged 31); Los Angeles, California, U.S.
- Occupation: Actor
- Years active: 1911–1917
- Relatives: Guy Standing (brother); Percy Standing (brother); Wyndham Standing (brother)

Jack Standing (10 February 1886 – 25 October 1917) was an English born American actor.

== Biography ==
The son of stage actor Herbert Standing and brother of Wyndham Standing (1880–1963), who also was a famous actor in the early days of film, Jack Standing first appeared in Broadway musicals such as The Belle of New York and Florodora before he went to the Biograph Company in 1909. Because he was a handsome young man, he was quickly offered many roles and signed a contract with Sigmund Lubin in 1911. Like many others from the silent film, Standing was asked to play quite everything from passionate lovers to villains or old men. In 1915, he told the Moving Picture World magazine, "Spare me from being a one-type actor!" He appeared in more than fifty films.

An incomplete print of 1915 Mary Pickford vehicle Fanchon the Cricket, in which Standing co-starred, has recently been found. The teenage Fred and Adele Astaire allegedly made their screen debuts in this film. Standing's greatest success was the 1916 film Hell's Hinges, where he played the weak-willed brother of Clara Williams. On 25 October 1917, Standing died of pneumonia at the age of 31, bringing a premature end to a promising career.

Standing married and had a son, Jack Standing Jr. (born 1914) who apparently appeared in early silent films as a child.

Many members of his family also worked in the theatre or films, including his father Herbert Standing (1846–1923) and brothers Wyndham, Herbert Jr., Sir Guy and Percy, as well as Herbert Jr.'s daughter Joan Standing and Sir Guy's daughter Kay Hammond.

== Filmography ==
Year	Title	Role	Notes
1914	The Perils of Pauline	Ensign Summers	Serial
1914	Detective Craig's Coup	Bob Brierly	
1914	The Price He Paid	The Doctor	
1915	The Road o' Strife		
1915	Fanchon the Cricket	Landry Barbeau	
1915	The Son	Gene Harlow – the Son	Short
1915	The Blindness of Devotion		Lost film
1916	The Evangelist	Rex Allen	Lost film
1916	Hell's Hinges	Rev. Robert Henley	
1916	Civilization's Child	Nicolay Turgenev	Lost film
1917	One Touch of Sin	Richard Mallaby	
1917	The Price of Her Soul	Snap Gun Connor	
1917	The Innocent Sinner	Walter Benton	
1917	The Amazons	Minor Role	Uncredited; Lost film
1917	The Curse of Eve	Leo Spencer	Lost film
1918	With Hoops of Steel	Paul Delarue	(final film role)
