= The Kid's Clever =

1929 film

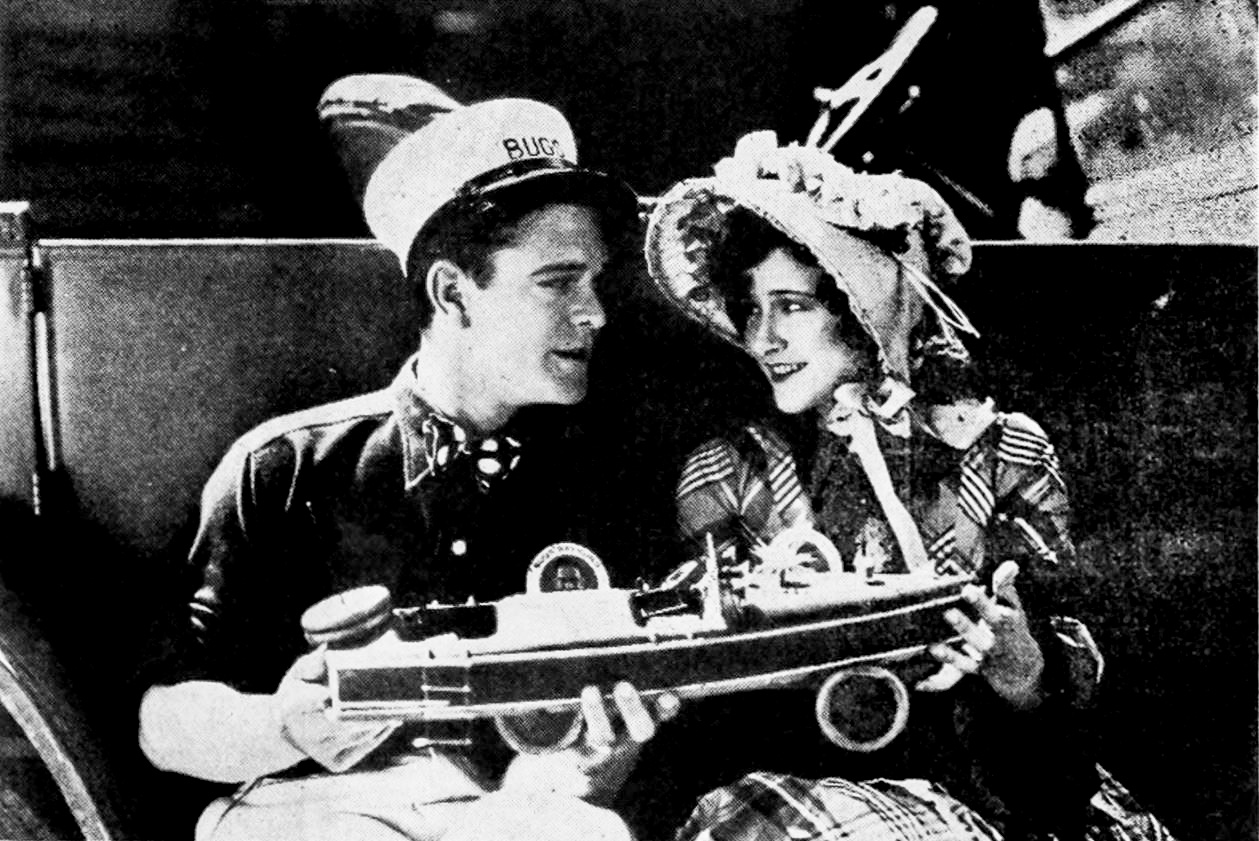
- Film still
- Directed by: William James Craft
- Screenplay by: Jack Foley; Ernest Pagano; Albert DeMond
- Story by: Vin Moore
- Produced by: Harry L. Decker
- Starring: Glenn Tryon; Kathryn Crawford; Russell Simpson; Lloyd Whitlock; George Chandler; Joan Standing
- Cinematography: Alan Jones
- Edited by: Charles Craft
- Production company: Universal Pictures
- Distributed by: Universal Pictures
- Release date: February 17, 1929
- Running time: 64 minutes
- Country: United States
- Language: Silent (English intertitles)

The Kid's Clever is a 1929 American silent comedy film directed by William James Craft and written by Jack Foley, Ernest Pagano, and Albert DeMond. The film stars Glenn Tryon, Kathryn Crawford, Russell Simpson, Lloyd Whitlock, George Chandler, and Joan Standing. The film was released on February 17, 1929, by Universal Pictures.

== Cast ==
- Glenn Tryon as Bugs Raymond
- Kathryn Crawford as Ruth Decker
- Russell Simpson as John Decker
- Lloyd Whitlock as Ashton Steele
- George Chandler as Hank
- Joan Standing as A Girl
- Max Asher as Magician
- Florence Turner as Matron
- Virginia Sale as Secretary
- Stepin Fetchit as Negro Man

== Preservation ==
With no prints of The Kid's Clever located in any film archives, it is a lost film.
