= To the Highest Bidder =

1918 film by Tom Terriss

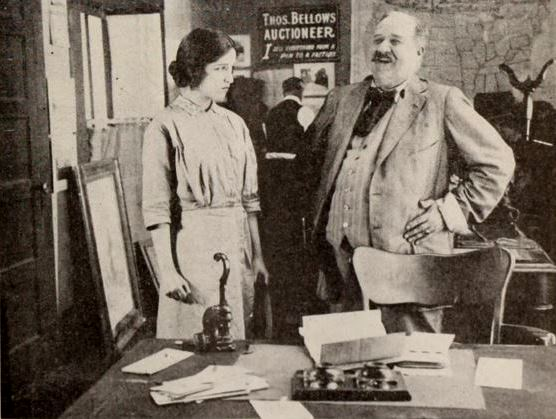
- Directed by: Tom Terriss
- Written by: Edward J. Montagne
- Based on: a novel To the Highest Bidder by Florence Morse Kingsley
- Produced by: Vitagraph Company of America
- Starring: Alice Joyce; Percy Standing; Mary Carr
- Cinematography: Joseph Shelderfer
- Production company: Vitagraph Company of America
- Distributed by: V-L-S-E
- Release date: July 13, 1918
- Running time: 5 reels
- Country: USA
- Language: Silent..English titles

To the Highest Bidder is a lost 1918 silent film drama directed by Tom Terriss and starring Alice Joyce. It was produced by the Vitagraph Company of America and distributed by a releasing company V-L-S-E.

== Cast ==
- Alice Joyce - Barbara Preston
- Percy Standing - Stephen Jarvis
- Walter McGrail - David Whitcomb
- Edna Murphy - Jennie
- Mary Carr - Miss Cottle

unbilled

- Stephen Carr - Jimmy Preston
- Jules Cowles - Peg Morrison
