= Yes, Madam =

Yes, Madam may refer to:

- Yes, Madam (1933 film), a British comedy film
- Yes, Madam (1942 film), an Italian romance film
- Yes, Madam (1985 film), a Hong Kong action film
- Yes, Madam?, a 1938 British musical comedy film
- Yes Madam (2003 film), an Indian Tamil-language comedy-drama film
