= The Loves of Letty =

1919 film by Frank Lloyd

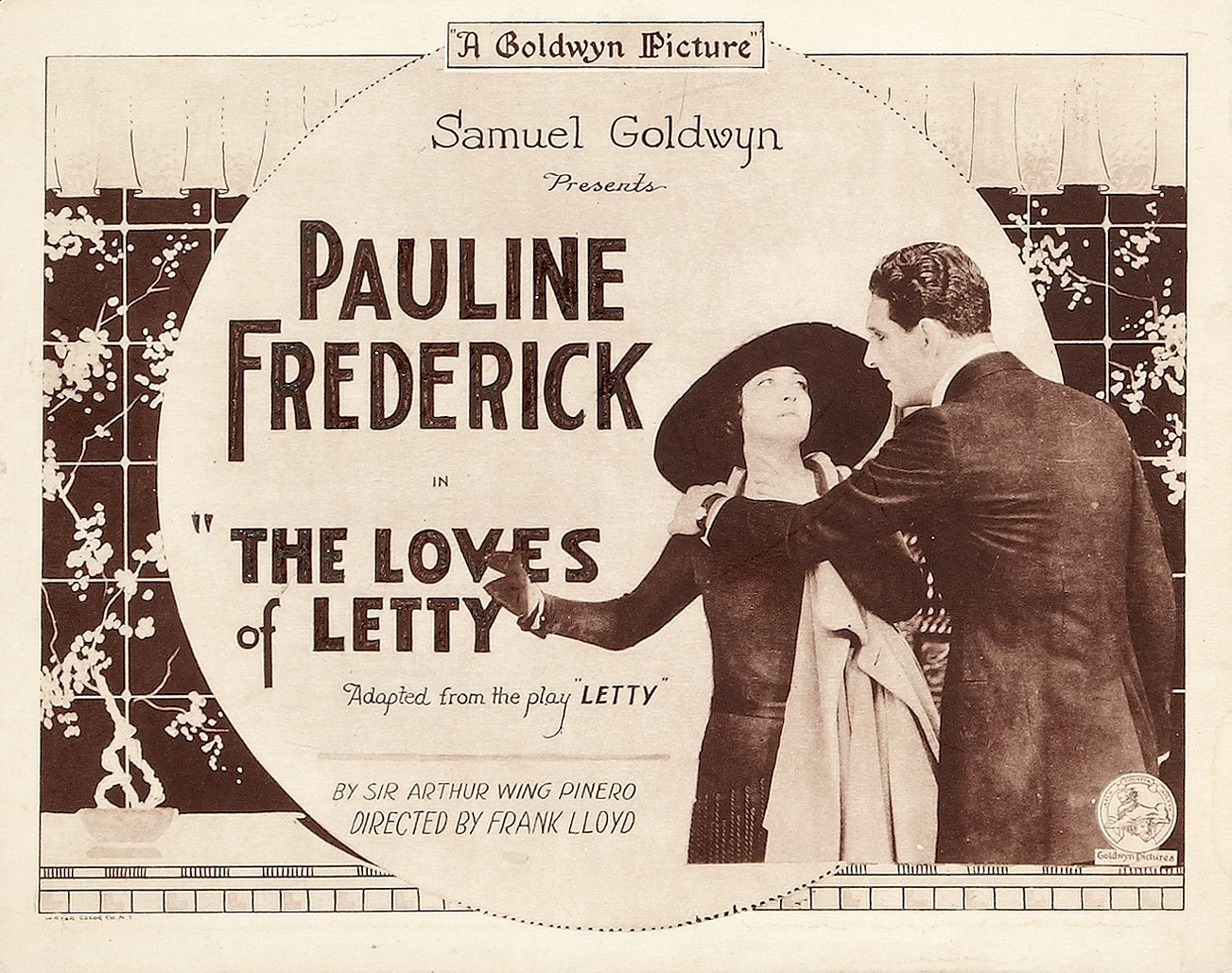
- Lobby card for the film
- Directed by: Frank Lloyd
- Written by: J. E. Nash (scenario)
- Based on: Letty by Arthur Wing Pinero
- Starring: Pauline Frederick
- Cinematography: Edward Gheller
- Distributed by: Goldwyn Pictures
- Release date: December 7, 1919
- Running time: 50 minutes
- Country: United States
- Language: Silent (English intertitles)

The Loves of Letty is a 1919 American silent drama film produced and distributed by Samuel Goldwyn and directed by Frank Lloyd. Based on the play Letty by Arthur Wing Pinero, the film features Pauline Frederick in the title role.

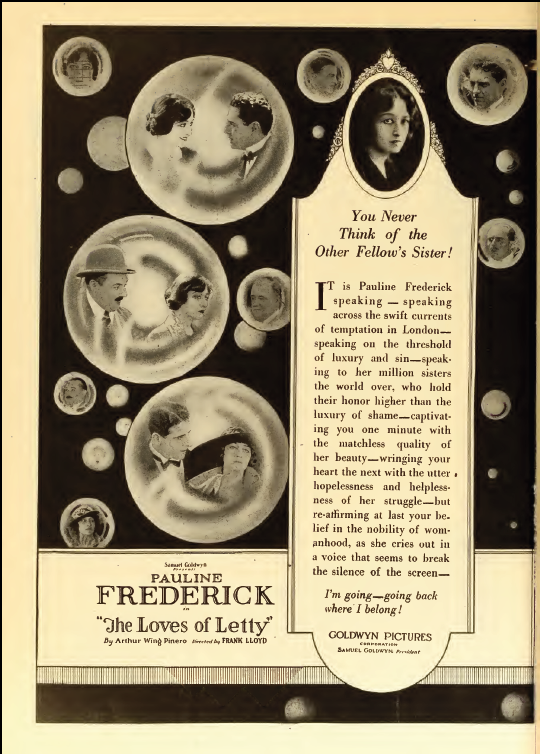
Contemporary advertisement

== Cast ==
- Pauline Frederick as Letty Shell
- John Bowers as Richard Perry
- Lawson Butt as Neville Letchmore
- Willard Louis as Bernard Mandeville
- Florence Deshon as Marion Allardyce
- Lela Bliss as Hilda Gunning (credited as Leila Bliss)
- Leota Lorraine as Florence Crosby
- Sidney Ainsworth as Ivor Crosby
- Harland Tucker as Coppy Drake
- Joan Standing as Slavey

== Preservation ==
The survival status of The Loves of Letty is disputed. The Library of Congress' American Silent Feature Film Survival Database listed no archival holdings of the film as of 2017. In February of 2021, the film was cited by the National Film Preservation Board on their Lost U.S. Silent Feature Films list. However, in 2014, Stanford's Pauline Frederick site references a "recent" rediscovery of a deteriorated 35mm nitrate print of the film in a European collection that was transferred to the Academy Film Archive.
