= The Other 'Arf =

British TV sitcom (1980–1984)

- Created by: Terence Howard; Paul Makin; Ian La Frenais
- Starring: John Standing; Lorraine Chase
- Country of origin: United Kingdom
- Original language: English
- No. of series: 4
- No. of episodes: 26

Production
- Running time: 30 minutes
- Production companies: ATV (series 1–2); Central Independent Television (series 3–4); WitzEnd Productions

Original release
- Network: ITV
- Release: 30 May 1980 – 30 March 1984

The Other 'Arf is a British television ITV sitcom series broadcast from 30 May 1980 to 30 March 1984. It stars John Standing as upper class Conservative politician Charles Latimer, MP, who begins a relationship with working class cockney fashion model Lorraine Watts (played by former model Lorraine Chase).

The series was produced for ITV by ATV and its successor Central Television.

== Cast ==
- Lorraine Chase - Lorraine Watts
- John Standing - Charles Latimer MP
- John Cater - George Watts (Series 1–3)
- James Villiers - Lord Freddy Apthorpe (Series 1–3)
- Patricia Hodge - Sybilla Howarth (Series 1–2)
- Steve Adler - Brian Sweeney (Series 1–2)
- Natalie Forbes - Astrid Lindstrom (Series 1)
- Sheila Keith - Mrs Lilley (Series 4)
- Richard Caldicot - Bassett (Series 4)

== DVD release ==
DVD	Release date
The Complete Series 1	17 January 2011
The Complete Series 2	23 January 2012
The Complete Series 3	TBA
The Complete Series 4	TBA
The Complete Series 1 to 4 Box Set	TBA
