= Mack Gray =

American actor (1905–1981)

- Born: December 11, 1905; Brooklyn, New York, U.S.
- Died: January 17, 1981 (aged 75); Beverly Hills, California, U.S.
- Occupation: Actor

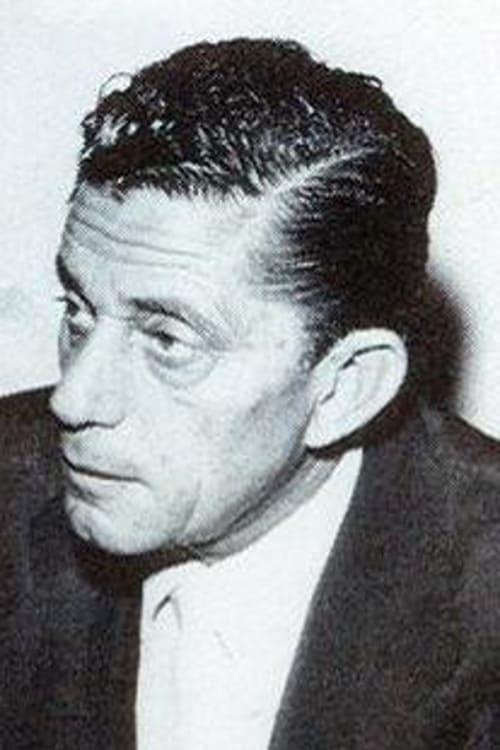

Mack Gray (December 11, 1905 – January 17, 1981) was an American actor, with credits in over 44 titles.

== Career and Personal life ==
Born Max Greenberg to Jewish parents, he was given the nickname "Killer" by Carole Lombard due to his roles, playing tough men. He was a confidant of Frank Sinatra, a close associate of Dean Martin for nearly 35 years, and friend of George Raft who described Gray as his "factotum" for 20 years. Mack Gray was often cast in the films of all three of his movie-star friends. Brother of longtime stuntman Joe Gray (actor). Joe Gray for 22 years was Martin's trusted stunt double, appearing in 32 of Martin's films and 12 of Frank Sinatra's films. Mack was beloved in his close circle of friends and coworkers for 5 decades.

== Filmography ==
Film
Year	Title	Credits	Notes
1962	Who's Got the Action?	Hood	
1962	Sergeants 3	Bartender	uncredited
1957	Ten Thousand Bedrooms	Party Guest	uncredited
1951	Love Nest	Man in Jail	uncredited
1951	You Never Can Tell	Prisoner in Jail	uncredited
1951	Rhubarb	Suspect in Polo Coat in Lineup	uncredited
1951	The Guy Who Came Back	Minor Role	uncredited
1950	Wabash Avenue	Poker Player	uncredited
1949	A Dangerous Profession	Fred-Taxi Driver	uncredited
1949	Red Light	Bookie	uncredited
1949	Take Me Out to the Ball Game	Gangster Henchman	uncredited
1949	The Lucky Stiff	Card Player	uncredited
1948	Race Street	Stringy	
1946	Nocturne	Gratz	credited as Mack Grey
1946	Mr. Ace	Mack	uncredited
1946	Whistle Stop	Bartender	
1945	Johnny Angel	Mack - the Bartender	
1945	Diamond Horseshoe	Mack- the waiter	uncredited
1944	Follow the Boys	Lt. Reynolds	uncredited
1943	Stage Door Canteen	Waiter	uncredited
1942	Broadway	Mack 'Killer' Gray	
1941	Meet John Doe	uncredited	
1941	Tall, Dark and Handsome	Mug	uncredited
1940	They Drive by Night	Mike	uncredited
1940	The House Across the Bay	Doorman, Lookout	uncredited
1939	Invisible Stripes	Henchman seated at party	uncredited
1939	I stole a million	uncredited	
1939	Each Dawn I Die	Joe - a gangster	uncredited
1939	Invitation to Happiness	Usher	uncredited
1939	Sudden Money	Duke	uncredited
1937	Night Club Scandal	Reed's Assistant	uncredited
1937	Double or Nothing	Man at Table	uncredited
1937	Exclusive	Secretary	uncredited
1937	Internes can't take money	Second Mug	uncredited
1936	Florida Special	Louie	
1935	She couldn't take it	Ike	uncredited
1935	The Glass Key	Duke	
1935	Goin' to Town	Croupier	uncredited
1935	Car 99	Smoke	
1935	Rumba	Assistant Dance Director	uncredited
1934	Bolero	Club Patron	uncredited
1934	All of Me	Tough Guy	uncredited
1933	The Bowery	Pug	uncredited
1929	Applause	Slim's Brother	uncredited

Television
Year	Title	Credits	notes
1966-1974	The Dean Martin Show	Music coordinator	16 episodes
1960	Startime	Music coordinator	1 episode
