= Hollywood Holiday =

1931 play

- Written by: John Van Druten
- Original language: English
- Genre: Comedy

Premiere
- Date premiered: 15 October 1931
- Place premiered: New Theatre

Hollywood Holiday is a comedy play by British writers John Van Druten and Benn Levy. The play is a satire on Hollywood script-writing, and sees a female playwright's script being transformed into half a dozen unrecognisable screenplays.

It ran at the New Theatre for twenty performances from 15 October and 31 October 1931. The original cast included Kay Hammond, Melville Cooper, Dennis Wyndham and Jean Cadell.

== Bibliography ==
- Wearing, J.P. The London Stage 1930-1939: A Calendar of Productions, Performers, and Personnel. Rowman & Littlefield, 2014.
