= The Honeymoon Express =

1926 film

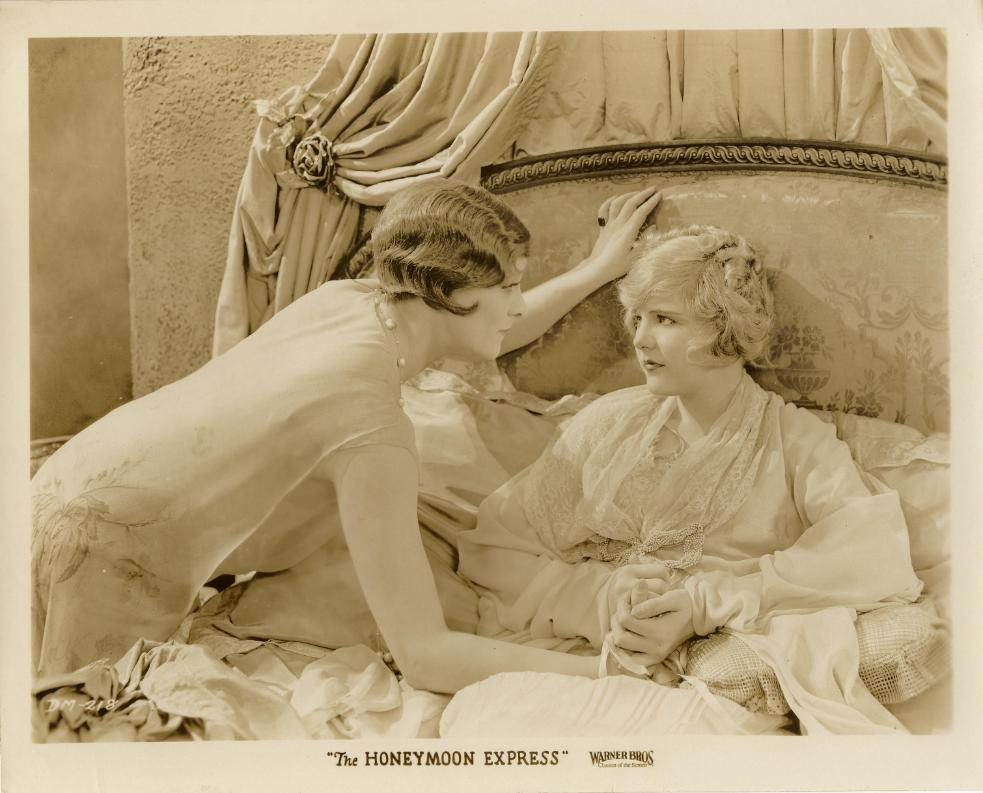
- Lobby card
- Directed by: James Flood
- Written by: Mary O'Hara
- Based on: The Doormat
- Starring: Willard Louis; Irene Rich
- Cinematography: David Abel; Willard Van Enger
- Production company: Warner Bros.
- Distributed by: Warner Bros.
- Release date: September 2, 1926 (limited release)
- Running time: 7 reels (70 minutes)
- Country: United States
- Language: Silent (English Intertitles)

The Honeymoon Express is a lost 1926 silent film drama based on Ethel Clifton and Brenda Fowler's play The Doormat. It was directed by James Flood, starring Willard Louis and Irene Rich. It was never originally meant to be released. Two runtimes were reported at two separate showings.

== Plot ==
The members of the Lambert household do not get along with each other, so Margaret and her youngest daughter Mary leave their home. Margaret becomes an interior director, resulting in her regaining her happiness. Margaret's son Lance becomes angry at his father John due to the people who are invited over to their home, and Lance starts a career with the help of his mother. John wants Margaret to return, but she refuses to do so. Margaret and her employer Jim become a couple, and so do Mary and Jim's brother Dick. The family becomes reunited, but with Jim as the head of the household.

== Cast ==
- Willard Louis as John Lambert
- Irene Rich as Mary Lambert
- Holmes Herbert as Jim Donaldson
- Helene Costello as Margaret Lambert
- John Patrick as Nathan Peck
- Jane Winton as Estelle
- Virginia Lee Corbin as Becky
- Harold Goodwin as Lance
- Robert Brower as Dick Donaldson

== Production ==
The film is based on a play titled The Doormat. It was directed by James Flood and the screenwriter was Mary O'Hara. The film was released by Warner Bros. Pictures. It was reported by The Film Daily on July 16, 1926, that Jack L. Warner of Warner Bros. Pictures was withdrawing the film from the releasing schedule, but it was later screened in September 1926 in New York City. The September 8, 1926, showing of the film in New York City was stated by Variety to be 64 minutes long, but it was reported by the magazine that an October 6, 1926, showing was 78 minutes long. The second reported length is more likely to be correct, considering its film reel length of 6,768 feet.

The book American Film Cycles: The Silent Era states that The Honeymoon Express is one of a few silent films that "reflected the decade's extended social tolerance of premarital and extramarital sex, and emphasized that these new freedoms brought additional responsibilities."

== Reception ==
The Palladium-Item said, "Your critic is willing to stake his reputation on the opinion that The Honeymoon Express is the sort of picture to be loved at sight and remembered gratefully long afterward". A review from The Tuscaloosa News praised the cast and stated, "All members of the family should see The Honeymoon Express".
