= La Petite Fadette =

1849 novel by George Sand

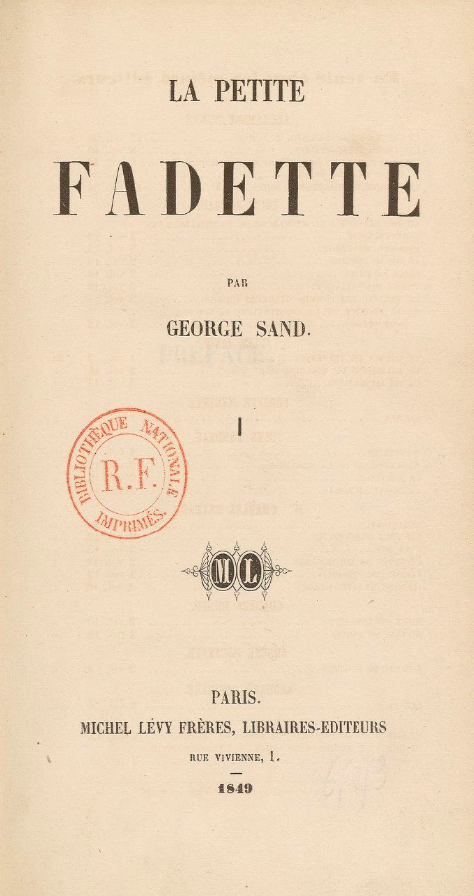
- Author: George Sand
- Language: French
- Genre: Romantic
- Publication date: 1849
- Publication place: France

La Petite Fadette, also published in English under the titles Little Fadette. A Domestic Story (1849), Fadette. A Domestic Story (1851) and Little Fadette (1967), is an 1849 novel written by French novelist George Sand, born Amantine Dupin. Sand wrote the rural story together with La Mare au Diable and François le Champi in the 1840s as she returned from Paris to the countryside of Châteauroux. The novel is one of Sand's best known today.

== Plot ==
The novel takes place in the 19th-century French countryside. The parents of Landry and Sylvinet, identical twin brothers, who are respectable and relatively rich farmers, do not follow the advice that is given at the twins' birth to keep separating and distinguishing them from each other while they are still young. Consequently, the twins grow up together. Although they are opposites, with Landry the less emotional, more conventionally strong twin, and Sylvinet, the less physically strong and more emotional one, the twins both love each other more than anything else. When they are 14 years old, the plot takes a turn. Due to the family's dire financial straits, one twin has to leave to work in a neighbouring farm, and Landry is chosen. Landry tries to hide his distress out of pride, unlike Sylvinet, who cries and is very demonstrative. Sylvinet does not understand how Landry can pretend to want to leave home. He is therefore hurt, and he responds angrily and emotionally to the separation, disappearing into the woods.

When looking for his brother in the woods, Landry encounters Fadette. Fadette lives with her younger brother and a grandmother who makes the two children work constantly. The children are despised and looked down upon by the other villagers for being different. The children are known as "witches" and indeed often appear unkempt, covered in dirt, and at one with the elements. When Fadette helps Landry to find his brother, she makes him promise to return the favor. She helps Landry cross a small river, on the other end of which he finds his brother.

At the next village fête, Fadette asks Landry to dance with her and only her. Landry is angered, though he knows he has promised to fulfill the favor. He is ashamed to be associated with Fadette due to her reputation as a witch and is disappointed, as Madelon, the most beautiful and coquettish girl in town, wants to dance with him instead. However, he reluctantly keeps his promise and even defends Fadette when the village boys attack her. Moved but embarrassed by the gesture, Fadette tells Landry to dance with whomever he wants and leaves the party. However, Landry goes after her and hears her crying. They talk at length in the dark village, and Landry realises that she is a very sweet, sensible, and intelligent person, and begins to fall in love with the little Fadette. He even wants to kiss her but she refuses, telling him that he will regret it the next day.

Fadette is right; the next day, Landry remembers her dirty face, and does not understand how he could have felt such an attraction for her. But soon after, he overhears a conversation between Fadette and Madelon that emphasizes that Fadette is kind and humble and the other girl is vain and proud. His feelings are then revived. He asks Fadette to marry him; a secret engagement.

Sylvinet is aware that something is different about his brother and that the relationship between them has changed. He suffers deeply and behaves badly in the eyes of everyone around him. Sylvinet then discovers their secret but keeps it to himself. It is when Madelon finds out that the news is spread through the village. Everyone, including Landry's parents, are shocked and urge him to end the relationship immediately. Landry refuses but Fadette decides to leave town to put an end to the scandal and talk. Some time after, Landry decides to leave since, due to Sylvinet's increasing anger and depression toward him, the twins' relationship has begun to fracture.

When Fadette returns to town, she has become a prosperous, attractive, and reputable young woman. After her grandmother's death, she inherits a surprisingly large amount of money and is able to look after herself and her brother properly. Now everyone in the village is forced to finally acknowledge her merits and even Landry's parents approve of their engagement. But jealousy is making Sylvinet more and more disgruntled and even physically ill. Although he initially refuses to see Fadette, she actually manages to cure Sylvinet and he finally accepts her. After Landry and Fadette are married, Sylvinet enlists in the army and leaves the provinces. Landry is not aware of Sylvinet's feeling, but in a twist of irony, it turns out that his mother and probably Fadette have suspected all along that Sylvinet is in love with Fadette. Thus his final enlistment is an act of sacrifice, as he does not want to stand in the way of his brother's happiness.

== Publication and adaptations ==
The novel was translated into English and published in 1900 by Henry Holt and Company, and an updated critical translation by Gretchen van Slyke was published by Penn State University Press in 2017.

A 1915 silent film, Fanchon the Cricket, starring Mary Pickford, was based on the novel.

A 2004 French television movie was directed by Michaëla Watteaux.
