= Florence Morse Kingsley =

American fiction author (1859-1937)

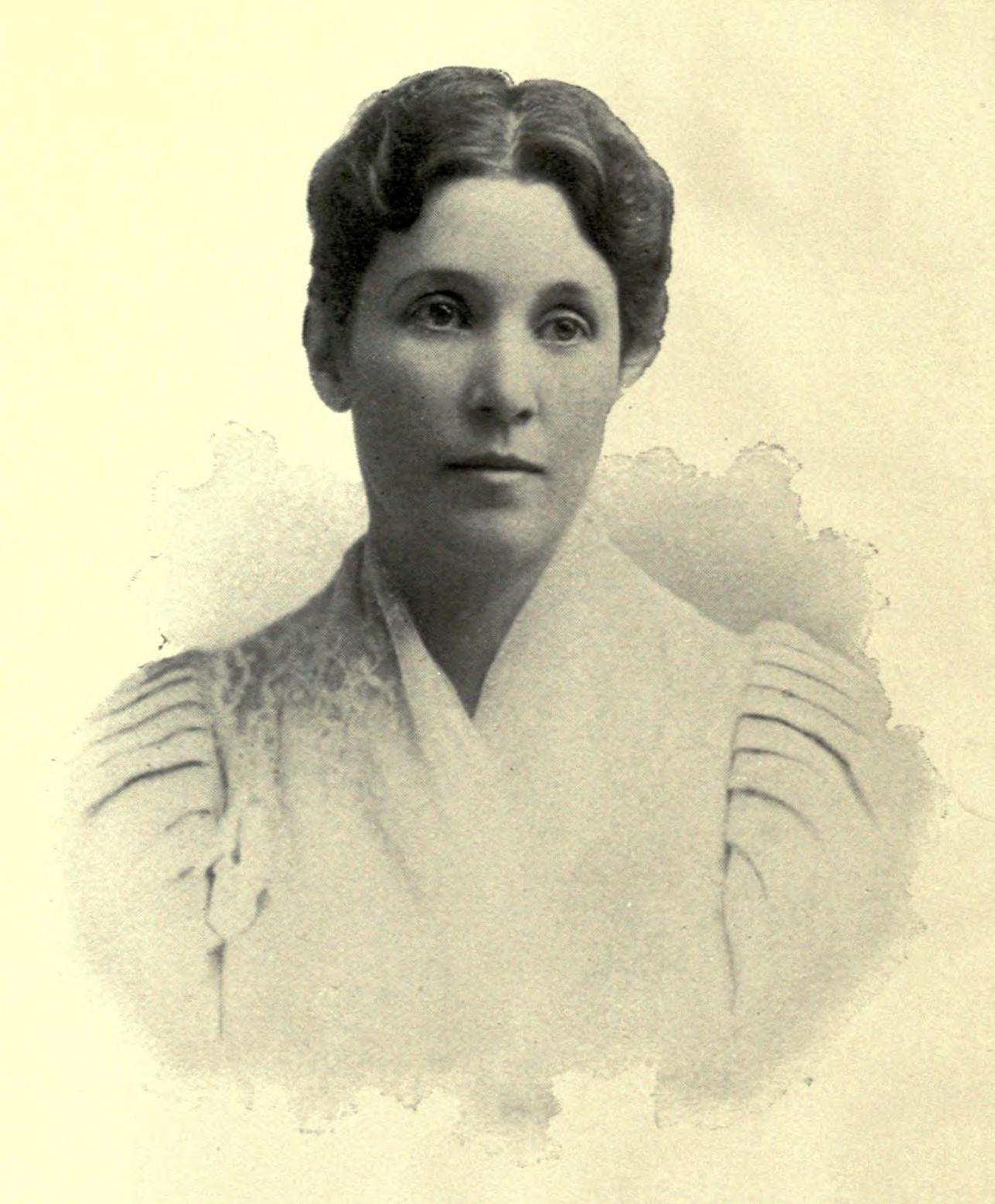
- Florence Morse Kingsley circa 1896
- Born: July 14, 1859; Medina County, Ohio, U.S.
- Died: November 7, 1937 (aged 78); Staten Island, New York, U.S.
- Education: Wellesley College
- Occupation: Writer
- Years active: 1879–1914

Florence Morse Kingsley (July 14, 1859 – November 7, 1937) was an American author of popular and religious fiction.

== Early life ==
Florence Morse Kingsley was born in Poe, Medina County, Ohio, to artists Eleanor Ecob and Jonathan Bradley Morse. Florence grew up in Brecksville Township, Ohio, where her parents were educators in the local school district.

== Personal life ==
Florence Morse was a student at Wellesley College from 1876 to 1879. However, she had to leave before graduating because of a severe eye problem.

She married Reverend Charles Rawson Kingsley, son of Frances Elizabeth Rawson and Charles Clark Kingsley on July 12, 1882 in Utica, New York. Dr. Charles and Mrs Florence Kingsley had five children: Charles Rawson Kingsley, Jr., Donald Morse Kingsley, Grace Ecob Kingsley, James Morse Kingsley, and John Bradley Kingsley.

== Professional life ==
Florence Morse Kingsley was a contemporary of fellow writer Lew Wallace, the author of Ben-Hur. The influence of her early Wellesley days were captured in her books:

- The Hired Baby
- And so They were Married
- The Wounds of a Friend
- The Princess and the Ploughman
- To the Highest Bidder (made into a movie of the same name)
- The Singular Miss Smith

When Kingsley was thirty-five, a publisher held a writing competition to obtain the best manuscript that would inspire a child's faith for Christ. It was in this contest that Florence Kingsley submitted her manuscript for Titus: A Comrade of the Cross. In six weeks, 200,000 copies had been printed to meet demand. She later published two other works of Christian fiction: the sequel to her original entitled Stephen: A Soldier of the Cross, and the epic tale The Cross Triumphant.

Kingsley was featured in, and a contributing writer to, the Ladies' Home Journal.
