= John Standing =

English actor (born 1934)

Sir John Standing Bt
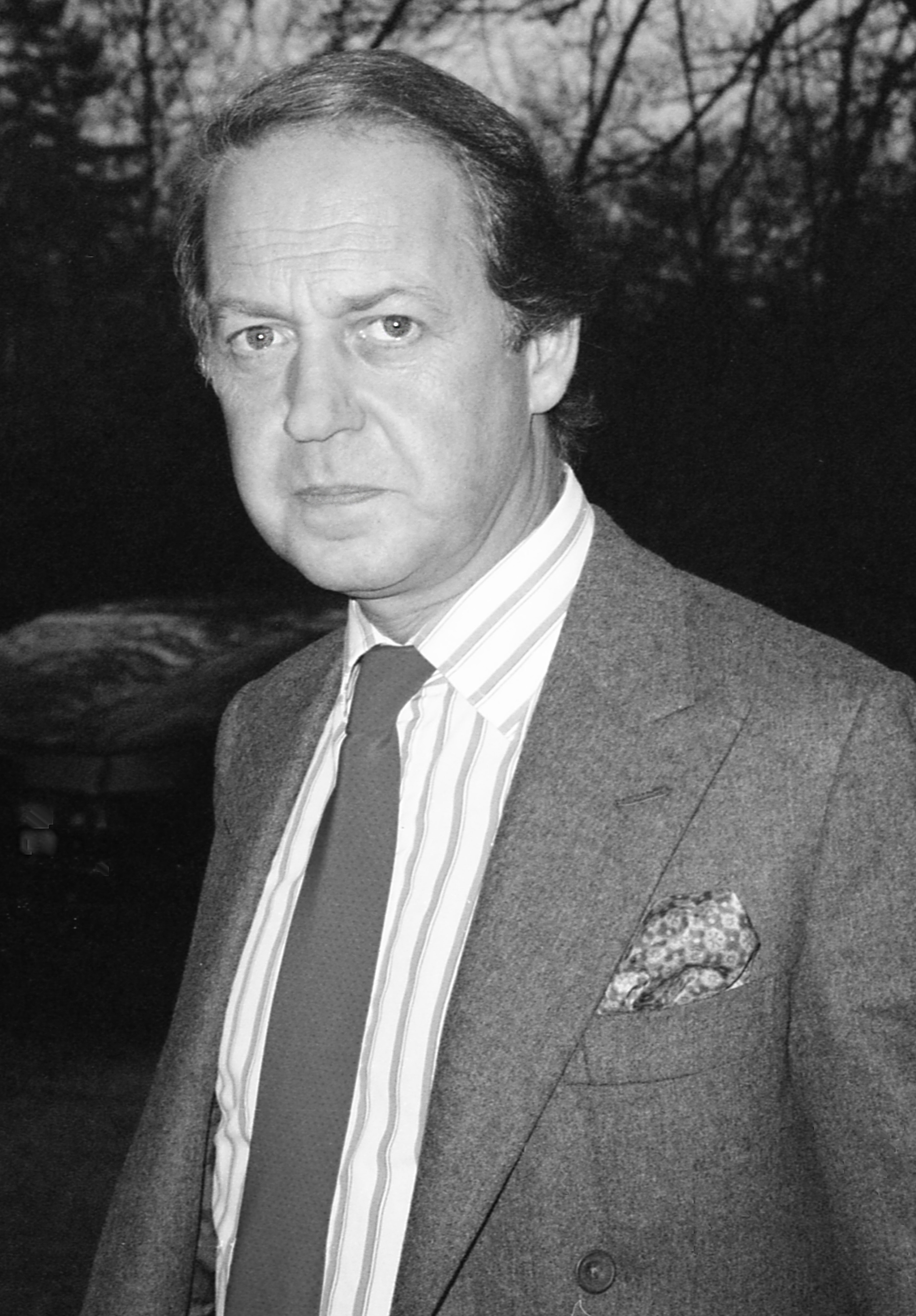
- Standing in 1986
- Born: John Ronald Leon; 16 August 1934 (age 92); London, England
- Education: Eton College; Byam Shaw School of Art
- Occupation: Actor
- Years active: 1955–present
- Spouses: Jill Melford (m. 1961; div. 1972) Sarah Forbes (m. 1984)
- Children: 4
- Mother: Kay Hammond

Sir John Ronald Leon, 4th Baronet (born 16 August 1934), known professionally as John Standing, is an English actor.

== Early life ==
Standing was born in London, the son of Kay Hammond (née Dorothy Katherine Standing), an actress, and Sir Ronald George Leon, 3rd Baronet, a stockbroker descended from Sir Herbert Leon, the builder of Bletchley Park. He succeeded his father as the 4th baronet in 1964, but does not use the title. The Leon family were, until 1937, owners of Bletchley Park. After the government acquired it, the country house in Buckinghamshire was used in the Second World War as a code-breaking centre.

Leon was educated at Eton College and Millfield School, Somerset. He did his National Service in the King's Royal Rifle Corps as a second lieutenant from 1954 to 1955, when he transferred to the Territorial Army. Later he studied at the Byam Shaw School of Art in London.

== Career ==
Standing began his theatre career in Peter Brook's 1955 production of Titus Andronicus starring Laurence Olivier and his wife Vivien Leigh. He later played leading parts in Oscar Wilde's The Importance of Being Earnest, Christopher Fry's Ring Round the Moon, A Sense of Detachment by John Osborne, and Noël Coward's Private Lives, with Maggie Smith. He was nominated for an Olivier award (1979) for Close of Play at the National Theatre.

He made his film debut in The Wild and the Willing (1962), going on to appear in King Rat (1965), Walk, Don't Run (1966), The Psychopath (1966), The Eagle Has Landed (1976), The Elephant Man (1980), Nightflyers (1987), Mrs Dalloway (1997) and A Good Woman (2004).

One of his first major television roles was as Sidney Godolphin in the BBC twelve-part serial, The First Churchills (1969). Other television appearances include Tinker, Tailor, Soldier, Spy (1979); the ITV sitcom The Other 'Arf (1980–84), with Lorraine Chase; The Choir (1995) and King Solomon's Mines (1985). In the United States, he made guest appearances in numerous weekly programmes including L.A. Law, Civil Wars and Murder, She Wrote, and co-starred briefly with Robert Wagner and Samantha Smith in the action series Lime Street (1985). In 1976, he also appeared opposite Peter O'Toole in the little-seen BBC thriller film, Rogue Male, directed by Clive Donner.

He appeared in the horror film Nightflyers (1987) adapted from a short story by George R. R. Martin. In 2002, he had a speaking credit on Lost Horizons, the second studio album from the British electronic duo Lemon Jelly. On track 1, "Elements", he lists the basic “elements" that make up the world: ash, metal, water, wood, fire and sky. On track 3, "Ramblin' Man", Standing reads a long list of various locations around the world, ranging from small Sussex villages to major world capitals.

In July 2010, it was confirmed that he would be appearing as Jon Arryn in the HBO series Game of Thrones, based on Martin's A Song of Ice and Fire novels.

== Filmography ==
=== Film roles ===
- A Pair of Briefs (1962) – Hubert Shannon
- The Wild and the Willing (1962) – Arthur
- The Iron Maiden (1962) – Humphrey Gore-Brown
- Hot Enough for June (1964) – Men's Room Attendant (uncredited)
- King Rat (1965) – Daven
- The Psychopath (1966) – Mark Von Sturm
- Walk, Don't Run (1966) – Julius D. Haversack
- Torture Garden (1967) – Leo Winston (segment 3 "Mr. Steinway")
- A Touch of Love (1969) – Roger Henderson
- All the Right Noises (1971) – Nigel
- X Y & Zee (1972) – Gordon
- Au Pair Girls (1972) – Buster
- Rogue Male (1976) – Major Quive-Smith
- The Eagle Has Landed (1976) – Father Philip Verecker
- Space: 1999, The Mark of Archanon (1976) – Pasc
- The Legacy (1978) – Jason Mountolive
- The Class of Miss MacMichael (1978) – Charles Fairbrother
- The Sea Wolves (1980) – Finley
- The Elephant Man (1980) – Fox
- Privates on Parade (1983) – Captain Sholto Savory
- To Catch a King (1984, TV movie) – Duke of Windsor
- The Young Visiters (1984) – Prince of Wales
- Invitation to the Wedding (1985) – Earl Harry
- Nightflyers (1987) – Michael D'Brannin
- Chaplin (1992) – Butler
- Mrs Dalloway (1997) – Richard Dalloway
- The Man Who Knew Too Little (1997) – Gilbert Embleton
- 8½ Women (1999) – Philip Emmenthal
- Rogue Trader (1999) – Peter Baring
- Mad Cows (1999) – Politician
- Pandaemonium (2000) – Rev. Holland
- The Calling (2000) – Jack Plummer
- Queen's Messenger (2001) – Foreign Secretary
- Witness to a Kill (2001) – Foreign Secretary
- Shoreditch (2003) – Jenson Thackery
- Jack Brown and the Curse of the Crown (2004) – Sheldon Gotti
- A Good Woman (2004) – Dumby
- Animal (2005) – Dean Frydman
- V for Vendetta (2006) – Bishop Anthony Lilliman
- Lassie (2005) – French
- Scoop (2006) – Garden Party Guests
- Rabbit Fever (2006) – Ally's dad
- Outlaw (2007) – Captain Mardell
- I Want Candy (2007) – Michael de Vere
- Before the Rains (2007) – Charles Humphries
- Cheerful Weather for the Wedding (2012) – Horace Spigott
- Queen and Country (2014) – Grandfather George
- The Hippopotamus (2017) – Podmore
- The Happy Prince (2018) – Dr Tucker
- The Great Escaper (2023) - Arthur

=== Television roles ===
- The Avengers (1963) – East
- The Saint (1963) – Gendarme
- Armchair Theatre (1964) – Siaru
- Danger Man (1965) – James
- The First Churchills (1969) – Sidney Godolphin
- Space: 1999 (1976) – Pasc
- Van der Valk (1977) – Ehrlich
- Tinker Tailor Soldier Spy (1979, TV mini-series) – Sam Collins
- The Other 'Arf (1980-1984) Charles Latimer MP
- Shillingbury Tales (1981) Dick Firman
- Pygmalion (1983, TV movie) – Col. Pickering
- Murder, She Wrote (1987–1990) – Chief Daniel Trent / Arthur Constable
- The Endless Game (1989) – Belfrage
- L.A. Law (1990) – Nigel Morris
- Eerie, Indiana (1992) - Professor Zirchon
- The Old Boy Network (1992) – Peter Duckham
- Riders (1993, TV film) – Malise Gordon
- Gulliver's Travels (1996, TV mini-series) – Admiral Bolgolam
- A Dance to the Music of Time (1997, TV mini-series) – Nicholas Jenkins
- NYPD Blue (2000) – Jimmy Cheatham
- The Real Jane Austen (2002) - Mr Austen
- The Falklands Play (2002) - Home Secretary William Whitelaw
- King Solomon's Mines (2004, TV mini-series) - Professor Samuel Maitland
- Midsomer Murders (2004) - Charles Rust - “Bad Tidings”
- The Line of Beauty (2006) – Lord Kessler
- Midsomer Murders (2009) - Will Tunstall - “The Dogleg Murders”
- Game of Thrones (2011) (Episode: "Winter Is Coming") – Jon Arryn (corpse)
- Agatha Christie’s Poirot (2013) - Colonel Toby Luttrell - “Curtain: Poirot’s Last Case”
- The Crown (2016) – Sir Henry Imbert-Terry

== Arms ==
Coat of arms of John Standing

Crest
Issuant from a mural crown Or a demi-lion Gules grasping in the paws a sunflower leaved and slipped Or seeded Sable.
Escutcheon
Gules two sunflowers erect slipped leaved and eradicated Or seeded Sable.
Motto
Seek The Truth

Baronetage of the United Kingdom
| Preceded by Ronald George Leon | Baronet (of Bletchley Park); 1964–present | Incumbent |
