= Marion Short =

American playwright

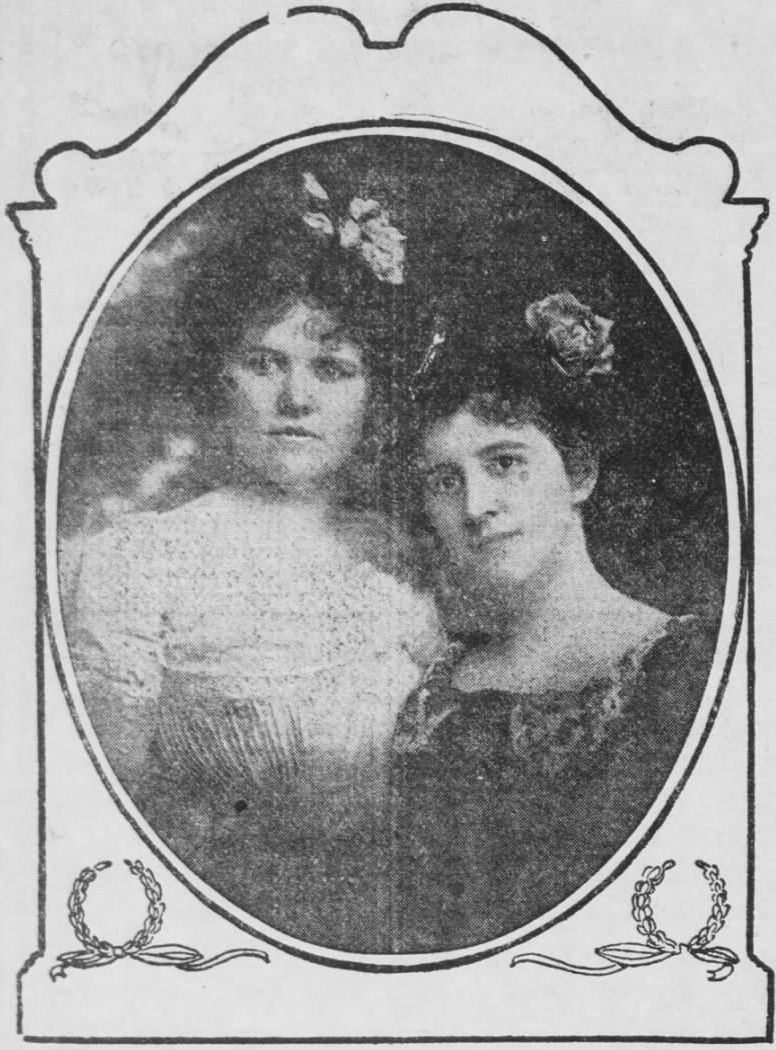
Marion Short (left) with Pauline Phelps, 1901

Marion Short (c. 1880–?) was an American dramatist, poet, and short story writer who produced a number of successful plays. Many of her works were co-authored with Pauline Phelps, and some were performed on Broadway. The silent film The Waiting Soul (1917) was based on one of her short stories, and Out Yonder (1919) on a play by her and Phelps.

== Biography ==
Little is known of Marion Short's personal life. She was born in Illinois around 1880. She lived in California before moving to New York. At the age of 40, she was living in Manhattan and was unmarried. Short's final known work was published in 1938, after which there is no record of her.

== Career ==
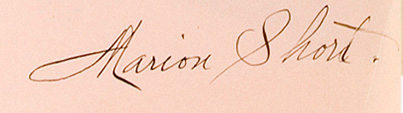
Signature, 1911

Marion Short had several poems published in her teens by Edgar S. Werner, and she continued to work with the publisher for more than thirty years. She was a popular elocutionist, performing recitations and sketches at multiple events throughout the 1890s. In the latter half of the decade, she would perform with others under the name of "The Marion Short Company", or "The Marion Short Three-Star Combination".

Short's repertoire included monologues by Pauline Phelps. She was a great admirer of Phelps' work, and started a correspondence with the writer which led to the two forming a literary partnership. The duo edited multiple works by other playwrights before they began publishing their own plays, sometimes under the pseudonym "Paul Marion". These would often star popular actresses of the day, such as Adelaide Thurston and Helen Hayes.

A prolific writer, Short would release several works every year; most of these were comedic plays, although she also published work in short story magazines. She was a skilled negotiator and businesswoman, which contributed to her success as a writer and consultant.

Short was a member of the American Society of Dramatists and Composers.

== Works ==
=== Short stories ===
- "Stevens the Conventional" (1904), appeared in The Red Book magazine
- "The Waiting Soul" (Aug, 1914), appeared in Snappy Stories magazine and adapted into the film The Waiting Soul (1917) by Wallace C. Clifton

=== Plays ===
- Folly Land Lyrics (1899), with Pauline Phelps
- When a Woman Loves (1900), with Pauline Phelps
- Halloween and Candle Light (1901), with Pauline Phelps
- Sweet Clover (1905), with Pauline Phelps
- The Girl from Out Yonder (1906), with Pauline Phelps, later adapted into the silent film Out Yonder (1919)
- St. Cecilia (1906), with Pauline Phelps
- A Grand Army Man (1907), with David Belasco and Pauline Phelps
- As Molly Told It (1909), with Pauline Phelps
- County Fair at Punkinville (1912), with Pauline Phelps
- Touch-down (1913)
- Pauline Pavlovna (1914)
- Blossoming of Mary Anne (1915), with Sidney Toler
- Home from College (1915)
- Jack's Brother's Sister (1916), with Pauline Phelps
- Return of Hi Jinks (1916)
- Honor of the Stars and Stripes (1918)
- Miss Somebody Else (1918)
- Golden Age (1919), with Sidney Toler
- What's Your Game (1919), with Sidney Toler
- The Flour Girl (1920), with Pauline Phelps
- Hot Pancakes (1920), with Pauline Phelps
- Shavings (1920), with Pauline Phelps (based on a novel by Joseph C. Lincoln)
- The Same Old Girl (1921), with Pauline Phelps and Charles George
- Cozy Corners (1922), with Pauline Phelps
- Witches' Hour and Candle Light (1922), with Pauline Phelps, (likely a reworking of their 1901 play Halloween and Candle Light)
- Lights of Happyland (1922)
- Alias Nora O'Brien (1923), with Lynn Osborn
- Rose of the Southland (1924)
- Only Me (1924), with Pauline Phelps
- The Belle of Philadelphia Town (1925), with Pauline Phelps
- The Hidden Guest (1926), with Pauline Phelps
- Nancy Pretends (1927), with Pauline Phelps
- The Flour Girl (1927), with Pauline Phelps
- Betty Engaged (1928)
- The Jade Necklace (1929)
- Getaway (1929)
- Stop! Go! (1930), with Pauline Phelps
- Peach Tree Road (1930)
- Nobody's Home (1931)
- Jealous? Certainly Not! (1931)
- Marindy Gets "Assurance" (1931)
- Nervous Miss Niles (1931)
- Rastus Gets Discussed (1931)
- The Wistful Widow (1932), with Pauline Phelps
- In Washington's Day (1932), with Pauline Phelps
- Black Gold (1932), with Pauline Phelps
- Her Alienated Affections (1932)
- The Mysterious Mrs. Updyke (1932)
- Impatience of Job (1932)
- Thrills (1932)
- The Ryerson Mystery (1933)
- She Wouldn't Stay Put (1933)
- The Return of Mr. Benjamin (1933)
- Who Said Quit? (1933), with Pauline Phelps
- Cupid Throws a Monkeywrench (1933)
- Grandpa Goes Hunting (1934)
- The Newspaper Bride (1934)
- They Will Grow Up (1934)
- Billy Goes Haywire (1935)
- Thirteen Diamonds (1935)
- A Short Story (1935)
- The Bad Boy Comes Back (1935)
- Aunt Sally and the Crime Wave (1936)
- Madam Magnificent (1936)
- Information Wanted (1937)
- The Little Terror (1937)
- The Trailer Man (1938)
