= Partners of the Tide (film) =

1921 film

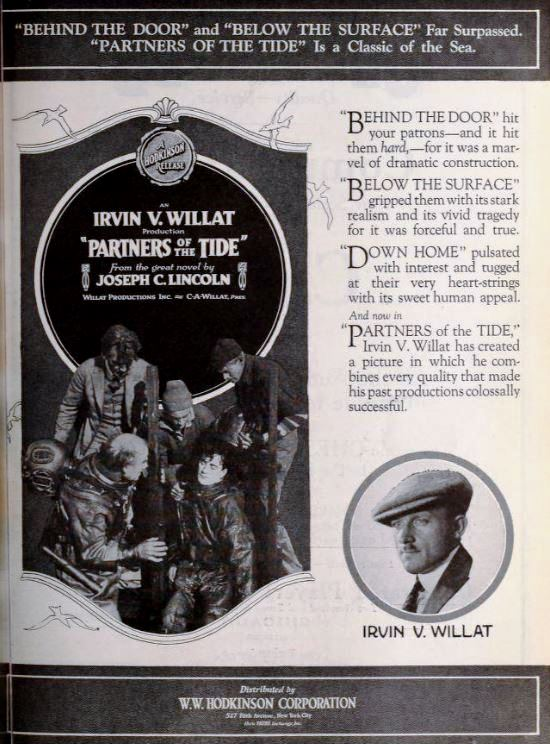
- Directed by: L.V. Jefferson
- Written by: Irvin Willat
- Based on: Partners of the Tide by Joseph C. Lincoln
- Produced by: Irvin Willat
- Starring: Jack Perrin; Daisy Jefferson; Gertrude Norman
- Cinematography: Paul Eagler
- Production company: Irvin V. Willat Productions
- Distributed by: Hodkinson Pictures
- Release date: March 20, 1921
- Running time: 70 minutes
- Country: United States
- Languages: Silent; English intertitles

Partners of the Tide is a 1921 American silent drama film directed by L.V. Jefferson and starring Jack Perrin, Daisy Jefferson and Gertrude Norman. It was distributed by the independent Hodkinson Pictures. It was based on the 1905 novel Partners of the Tide by Joseph C. Lincoln.

== Cast ==
- Jack Perrin as Bradley Nickerson
- Marion Feducha as Bradley as a Boy
- Gordon Mullen as Sam Hammond
- Daisy Jefferson as Augusta Baker
- Gertrude Norman as Grandma Baker
- J.P. Lockney as Captain Ezra Titcomb
- Joe Miller as Carl Swenson
- Bert Hadley as James Williams
- Fred Kohler as First Mate
- Florence Midgley as Temperance Allen
- Ashley Cooper as Seth Rogers

== Bibliography ==
- Munden, Kenneth White. The American Film Institute Catalog of Motion Pictures Produced in the United States, Part 1. University of California Press, 1997.
