= Mary Cecil =

Mary Cecil may refer to:

- Emily Cecil, Marchioness of Salisbury (1750–1835), full name Mary Amelia Cecil
- Mary Cecil, 2nd Baroness Amherst of Hackney (1857–1919)
- Mary Cecil (actress), appeared in Persuasive Peggy (1917)
