= More Truth Than Poetry =

1917 silent film directed by Burton King

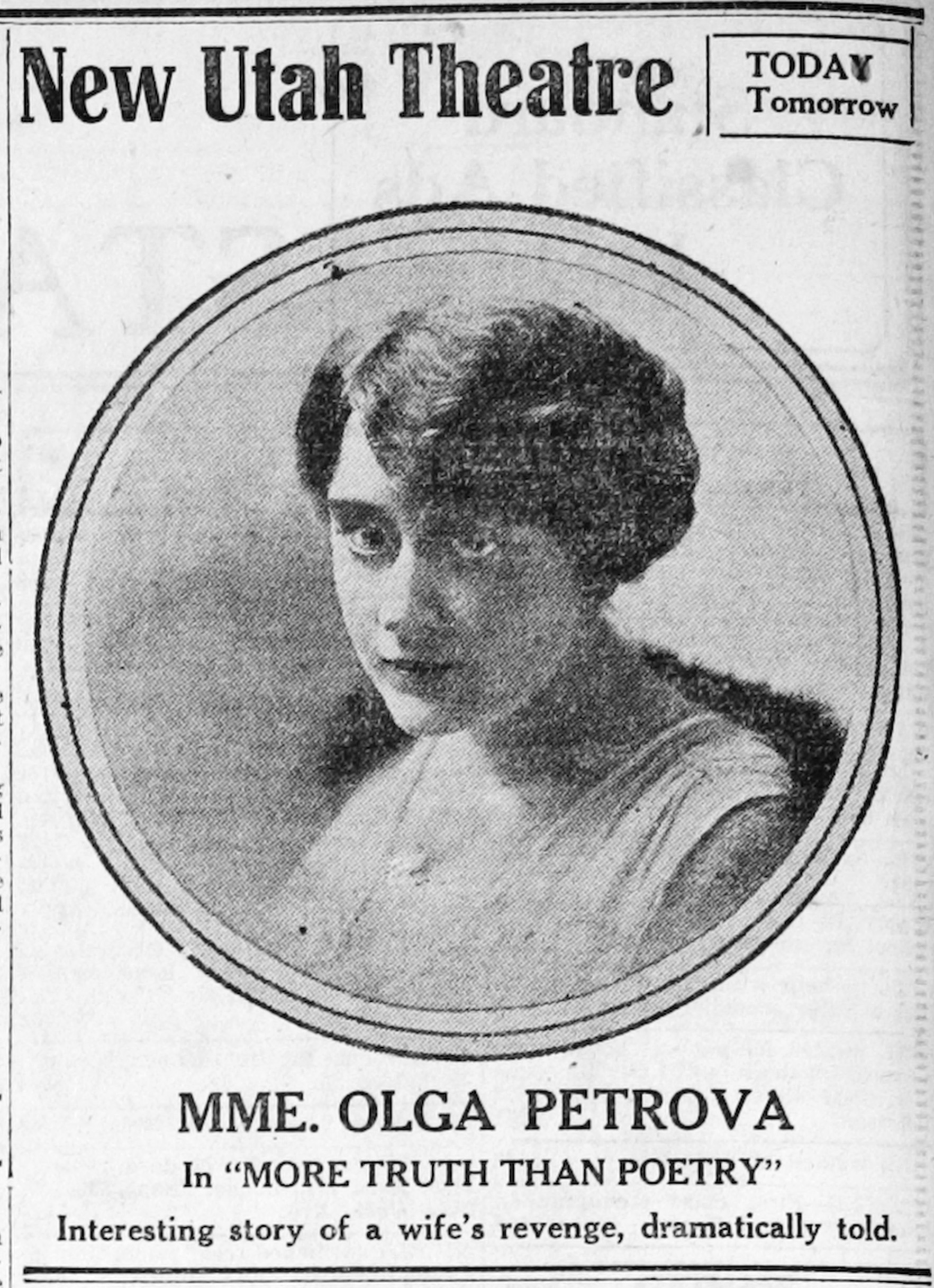
- Contemporary advertisement
- Directed by: Burton King
- Screenplay by: Emma Bell Clifton (scenario)
- Story by: Olga Petrova
- Starring: Olga Petrova; Mahlon Hamilton; Charles Martin
- Cinematography: Harry B. Harris
- Production company: Metro Pictures
- Release date: October 22, 1917 (US)
- Running time: 5 reels
- Country: United States
- Language: English

More Truth Than Poetry is a 1917 American silent drama film, directed by Burton King. It stars Olga Petrova, Mahlon Hamilton, and Charles Martin, and was released on October 22, 1917.

== Cast list ==
- Olga Petrova as Elaine Esmond/Vera Maitland
- Mahlon Hamilton as Ashton Blair/Blake Wendell
- Charles Martin as Daniel Maitland
- Violet Reed as Florence Grant
- Harry Burkhardt as Robert Grant
- Mary Sands as Grace Danby
- William B. Davidson as Allen Danby
- Tony Merlo as Louis Barrentos
