= The Silence Sellers =

1917 silent film directed by Burton L. King

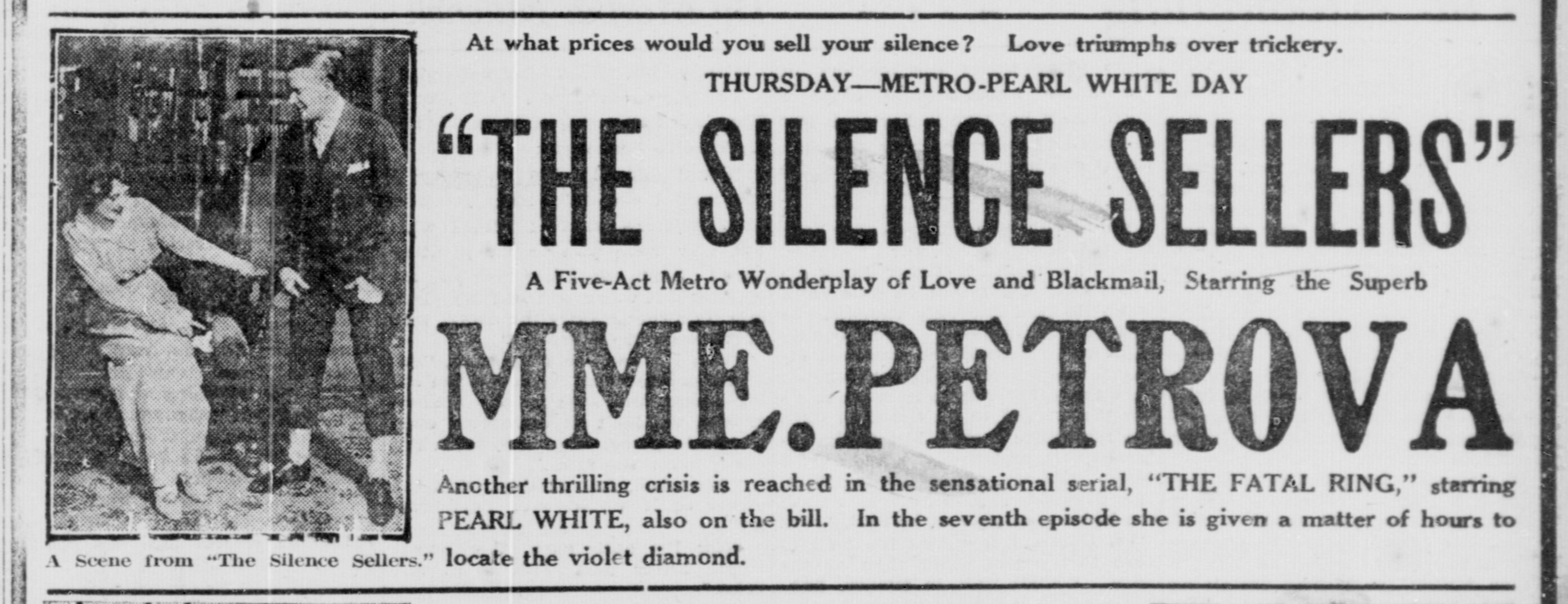
- Newspaper advertisement
- Directed by: Burton King
- Written by: Wallace Clifton
- Based on: an unknown titled short story by Blair Hall
- Starring: Olga Petrova; Mahlon Hamilton; Wyndham Standing
- Cinematography: Harry B. Harris
- Production company: Metro Pictures
- Release date: September 24, 1917 (US)
- Running time: 5 reels
- Country: United States
- Language: English

The Silence Sellers is a 1917 American silent drama film, directed by Burton King. It stars Olga Petrova, Mahlon Hamilton, and Wyndham Standing, and was released on September 24, 1917.

== Cast list ==
- Olga Petrova as Laura Sutphen
- Mahlon Hamilton as Donald Loring
- Wyndham Standing as Von Kolnitz
- Violet Reed as Sue Schuyler
- Charles Dungan as John Sutphen
- Miles McCarthy as Walter Schuyler
- Henry Leone as Hoffman
- Edward James as Butler
