= A Wonderful Wife =

1922 film directed by Paul Scardon

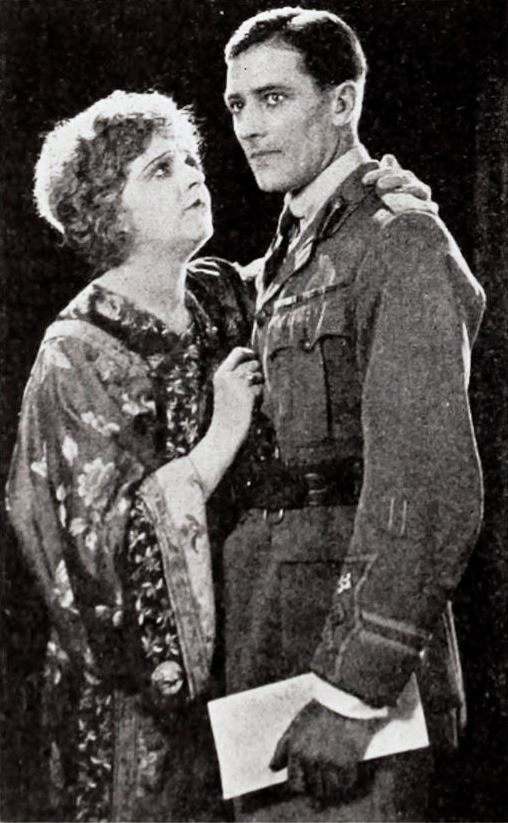
- Still from a magazine
- Directed by: Paul Scardon
- Screenplay by: Arthur F. Statter
- Based on: The Rat Trap by Dolf Wyllarde
- Starring: Miss DuPont; Vernon Steele; Landers Stevens; Charles Arling; Ethel Ritchie; Harris Gordon
- Cinematography: Ben F. Reynolds
- Production company: Universal Film Manufacturing Company
- Distributed by: Universal Film Manufacturing Company
- Release date: April 24, 1922
- Running time: 50 minutes
- Country: United States
- Language: Silent (English intertitles)

A Wonderful Wife is a 1922 American drama film directed by Paul Scardon and written by Arthur F. Statter. It is based on the 1904 novel The Rat Trap by Dolf Wyllarde. The film stars Miss DuPont, Vernon Steele, Landers Stevens, Charles Arling, Ethel Ritchie, and Harris Gordon. The film was released on April 24, 1922, by Universal Film Manufacturing Company.

== Plot ==
As described in a film magazine, Chum Lewin (Dupont) is interested in advancing the career of her husband, Captain Alaric Lewin (Steele), in the British military service. Alaric is secretary to Commissioner Gregory (Stevens), and, in order to secure her husband a better post, Chum professes unusual interest in Gregory and his plans and allows him to hold her hand. Gregory becomes inflamed with passion and sends Captain Lewin to a far off point in the interior of Africa, from which he determines that his secretary will never return. Chum learns of Gregory's treachery and forces him to furnish her with an escort to take her to her husband's posting. She finds him ill with fever. Gregory follows her and, when natives attack, he meets an untimely death.

== Cast ==
- Miss DuPont as Chum Lewin
- Vernon Steele as Capt. Alaric Lewin
- Landers Stevens as Commissioner Gregory
- Charles Arling as Halton
- Ethel Ritchie as Diana
- Harris Gordon as Nugent
- Nick De Ruiz as Native Groom
