= Exile (1917 film) =

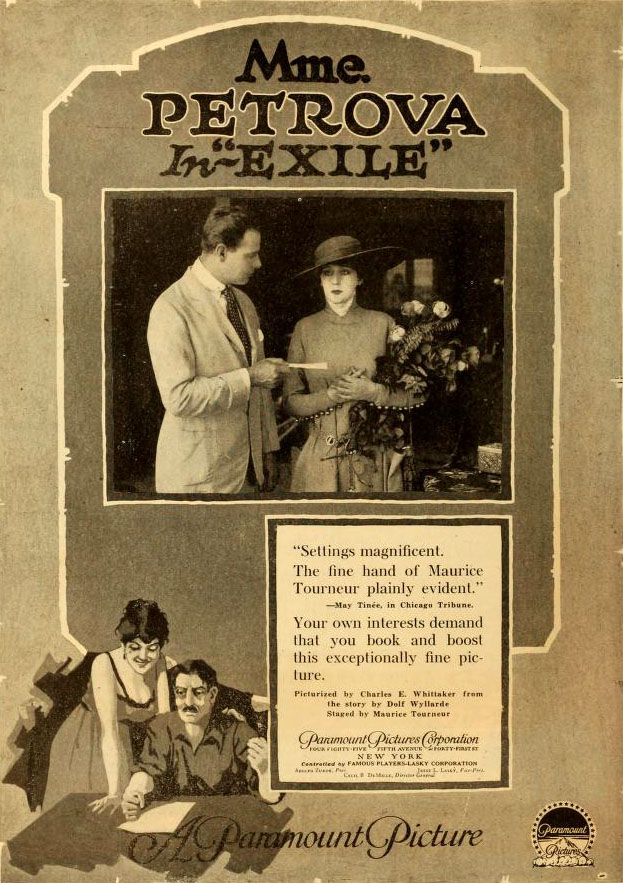
- Advertisement for film
- Directed by: Maurice Tourneur
- Screenplay by: Charles E. Whittaker; Dolf Wyllarde
- Based on: Exile, An Outpost of Empire; 1916 novel by Dolf Wyllarde
- Produced by: Jesse L. Lasky
- Starring: Olga Petrova; Wyndham Standing; Mahlon Hamilton; Warren Cook; Charles Martin; Violet Reed
- Cinematography: John van den Broek
- Edited by: Clarence Brown
- Production company: Jesse L. Lasky Feature Play Company
- Distributed by: Paramount Pictures
- Release date: September 1917
- Running time: 50 minutes
- Country: United States
- Language: Silent (English intertitles)

Exile is a 1917 American silent drama film directed by Maurice Tourneur and written by Charles E. Whittaker based upon the 1916 Dolf Wyllarde novel. The film stars Olga Petrova, Wyndham Standing, Mahlon Hamilton, Warren Cook, Charles Martin, and Violet Reed. The film was released in September 1917, by Paramount Pictures. It is not known whether the film currently survives, which suggests that it is a lost film.

== Plot ==
As described in a film magazine, American engineer Richmond Harvey is working for the betterment of Exile, a Portuguese colony. Vincento Perez, as chief justice, holds the power of life and death over thousands of Arabs. Perez desires to obtain a letter he has written Harvey, which, if published, would mean the ruin of Perez. He sends his wife Claudia to Harvey's quarters, where she intimates that she is in love with him. They have a sumptuous dinner and sit far into the night talking. Finally she retires, handing Harvey the key to her room. He tells her that he will not take advantage of the situation, and in the morning hands her the letter. She gives it to her husband and leaves him. The Arabs arise against Perez and kill him. Harvey saves Claudia's life by snatching her from a veranda surrounded by angry Arabs and they ride off together.

== Cast ==
- Olga Petrova as Claudia Perez
- Wyndham Standing as Vincento Perez
- Mahlon Hamilton as Richmond Harvey
- Warren Cook as The Governor of Exile
- Charles Martin as Manuel D'Alfrache
- Violet Reed

== Reception ==
Like many American films of the time, Exile was subject to cuts by city and state film censorship boards. The Chicago Board of Censors issued an Adults Only permit for the film. The Board then cut, in Reel 2, the intertitles "Offer him anything — understand, anything", "Offer him anything", "I am authorized to offer anything", and "We must have it at any price", and two debauchery scenes; in Reel 3, a closeup of Claudia placing key to her room on table before ascending stairs and the intertitles "That was the bargain, wasn't it", "My love for you is too sincere to permit of any act reflecting on your honor", and "Are you absolutely stone? Does the sacrifice mean nothing to you?"; and in Reel 4, the intertitles "What did you pay for it?", "You lost any right you might have had", and "your brutality has cost you my love", and the closeup of Perez strangling Claudia as she is lying on a stone.
