= Partners of the Tide =

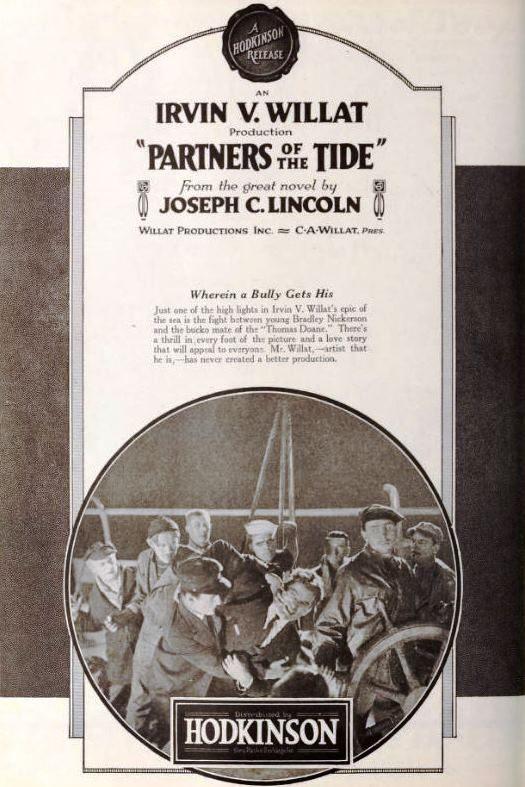

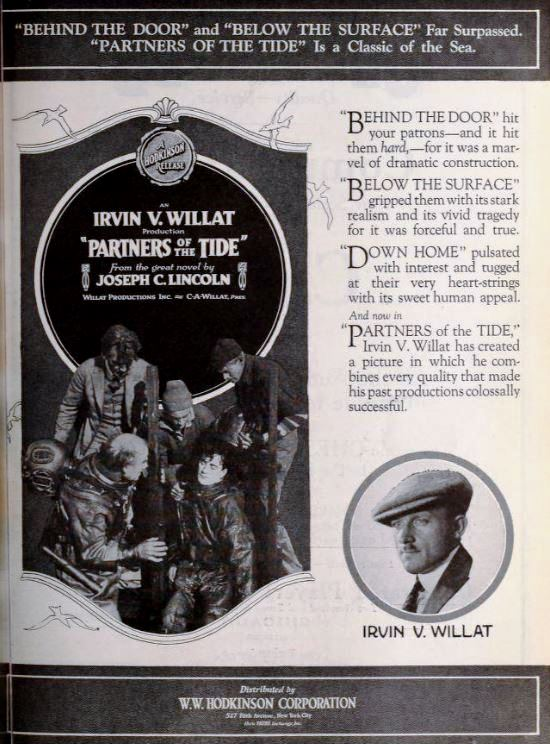

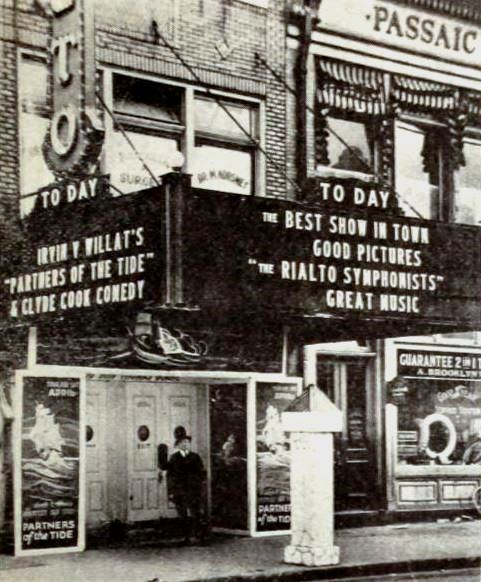
Partners of the Tide advertised on the marquee and on a poster at the Passaic Rialto Theater

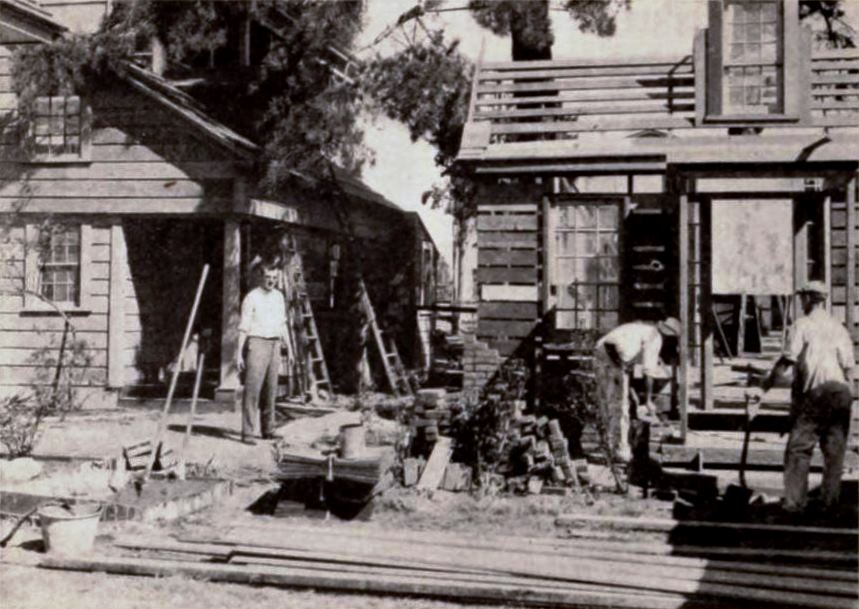
Movie set construction

Partners of the Tide is a novel by Joseph C. Lincoln published in 1905. It was adapted into a 1921 film. The story revolves around a shipwreck. L. V. Jefferson is given directing credit in the catalog of copyrights.

== Film ==
The film was an Irvin V. Willat production and the fourth film made at Willat Studios.

== Cast ==
- Jack Perrin
- Marion Feducha
- Gordon Mullen
- Daisy Jefferson
- Gertrude Norman
