= The Soul of a Magdalen =

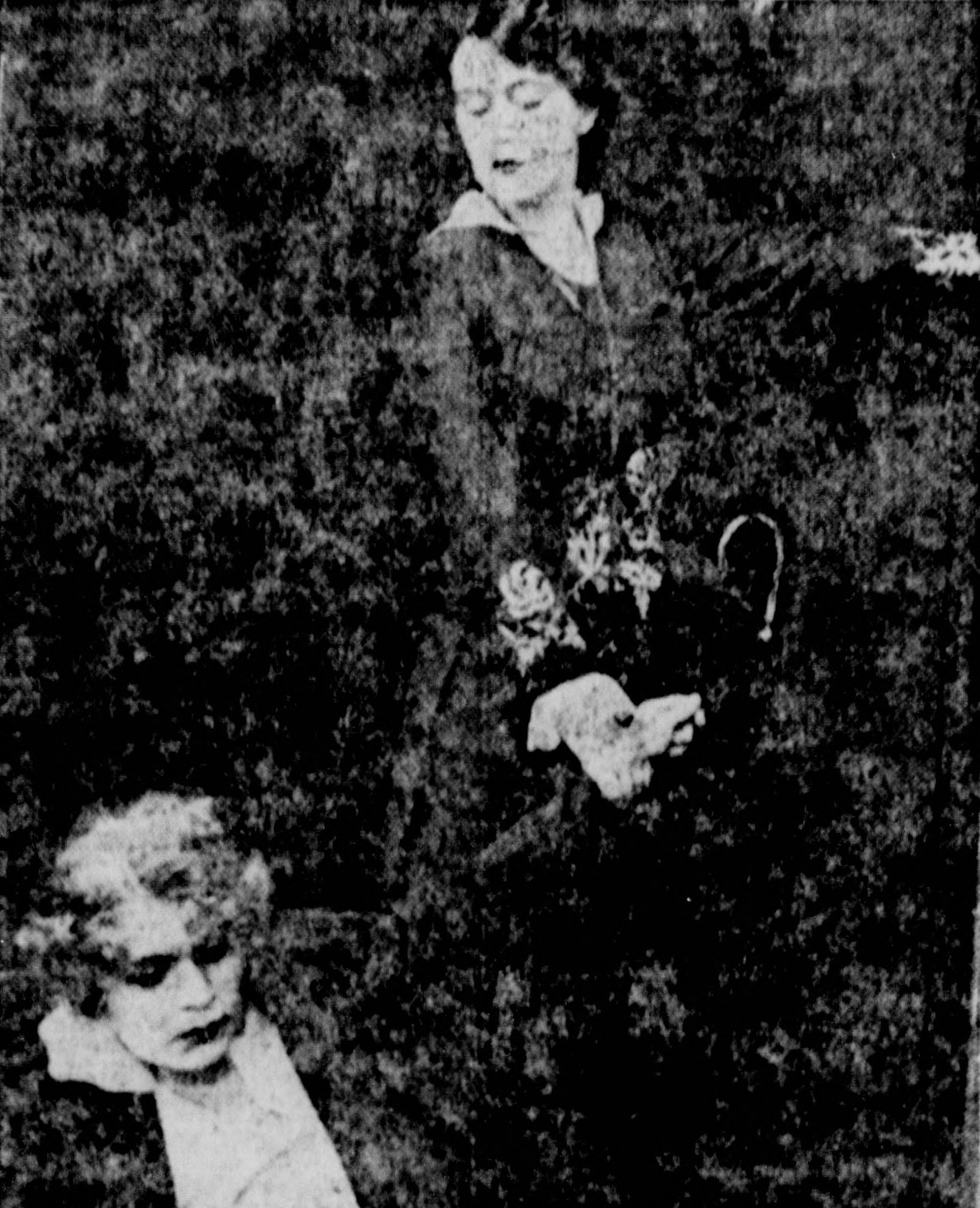
- Scene from the film
- Directed by: Burton L. King
- Written by: Lillian Case Russell
- Starring: Olga Petrova; Wyndham Standing; Mahlon Hamilton
- Cinematography: Harry B. Harris
- Production companies: Popular Plays and Players
- Distributed by: Metro Pictures
- Release date: May 14, 1917
- Running time: 50 minutes
- Country: United States
- Languages: Silent; English intertitles

The Soul of a Magdalen is a 1917 American silent drama film directed by Burton L. King and starring Olga Petrova, Wyndham Standing and Mahlon Hamilton.

== Cast ==
- Olga Petrova as Heloise Broulette
- Wyndham Standing as Leland Norton
- Mahlon Hamilton as Carter Vail
- Mathilde Brundage as Mrs. Vail
- Violet Reed as Lil
- Gene Burnell as Alice Vail
- Frances Walton as Mrs. Broulette
- Richard Barthelmess as Louis Broulette
- Boris Korlin as Valet
- Frank Moore as Dr. Crane

== Bibliography ==
- Lowe, Denise. An Encyclopedic Dictionary of Women in Early American Films: 1895-1930. Routledge, 2014.
