= Pauline Phelps =

American dramatist

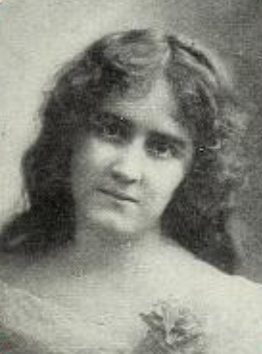
- Pauline Phelps, from a 1903 publication
- Born: November 13, 1870; Simsbury, Connecticut
- Died: January 6, 1963 (aged 92); Medical Lake, Washington
- Other name: Pauline Short
- Occupations: Stenographer, Writer, Playwright

Pauline Phelps (November 13, 1870 – January 6, 1963) was an American writer and playwright, known for writing short monologues for recitation, and for her collaborations with partner Marion Short.

== Early life ==
Pauline Isabelle Phelps was born in Simsbury, Connecticut, the daughter of George Mortimer Phelps and Abigail Case Phelps.

== Career ==
Popular recitation pieces by Pauline Phelps included historical works such as Rosalind's Surrender (1901) and As the Moon Rose, comic pieces with titles like Aunt Sarah on Bicycles and Telephone Romance (1899), and the unusual Shakespearian Conference, in which a cast of Shakespeare's tragic characters gather to discuss the ways to increase the audience for Shakespeare plays. Phelps's plays were often performed by amateur community and school drama programs. Her Daughters of the Revolution starred vaudevillian performer Neil Burgess as Hannah Thurber, in a 1903 production.

Phelps often collaborated with her partner Marion Short on writing plays, sometimes using the joint pen-name Paul Marion. Works by the duo included When a Woman Loves (1900), The Girl from Out Yonder (1906; adapted as the 1919 film Out Yonder), A Grand Army Man (co-authored with David Belasco and performed on Broadway in 1907, with David Warfield and Antoinette Perry in the cast), As Molly Told It (1909), Jack's Brother's Sister (1916), The Flour Girl (1920), Shavings (1920, based on a novel by Joseph C. Lincoln), The Belle of Philadelphia Town (1925), Cosy Corners (1922), Stop! Go! (1930), The Wistful Widow (1932), and Sweet Clover. They also adapted some works by English playwright Ina Leon Cassilis for American performance.

Sweet Clover, one of the first of her collaborations with Marion Short to reach the stage, was called "by far the strongest play turned out yet by American female dramatists" by a critic from the Philadelphia Record. Actress Adelaide Thurston starred in two early Phelps/Short plays in the 1900s, Sweet Clover and The Girl from Out Yonder.

Late in her career, Phelps turned to adaptations. She adapted Louisa May Alcott's Little Women for performance in 1939, and wrote a stage adaptation of Jane Eyre in 1941, as well as stage adaptations of J. M. Barrie's The Little Minister (1940) and Jane Austen's Pride and Prejudice (1941). After World War II several further short plays and adaptations by Phelps appeared, including Madame Butterfly (1954).

== Later life ==
Pauline Phelps traveled to North Dakota to marry Hugh Connoran Short and reside in rural Billings County. They were married in Dawson County Montana in 1942. Social security records list her death in the town of Medical Lake, Spokane County, Washington in January, 1963.
