= Wyndham Standing =

English film actor (1880–1963)

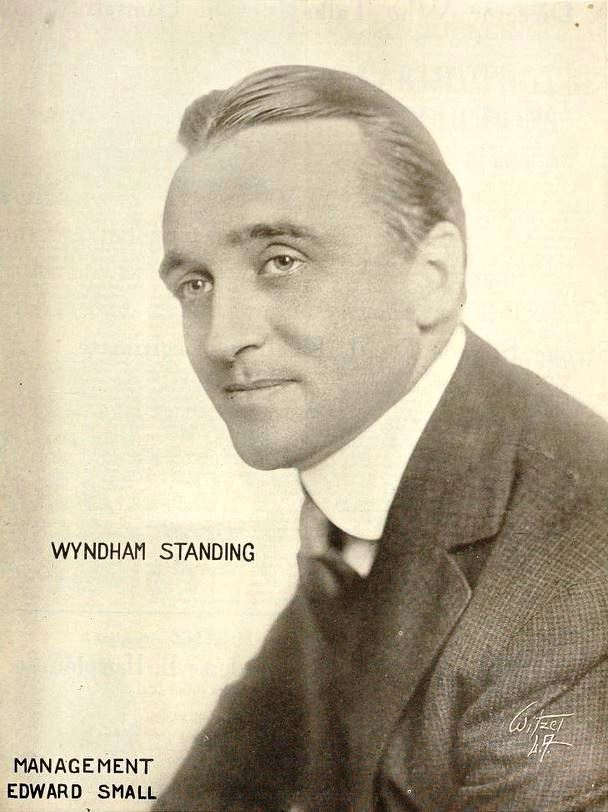
- Standing in 1919
- Born: Charles Wyndham Standing; 23 August 1880; London, England
- Died: 1 February 1963 (aged 82)
- Occupation: Actor
- Years active: 1915–1948
- Father: Herbert Standing
- Relatives: Guy Standing (brother); Jack Standing (brother); Percy Standing; Joan Standing (niece); Kay Hammond (niece); Charles Wyndham (uncle)

Charles Wyndham Standing (23 August 1880 – 1 February 1963) was an English film actor.

== Early years ==
Standing was born in London, England and died in Los Angeles, California. He was the son of veteran actor Herbert Standing and the brother of actors Sir Guy Standing, Jack Standing, Herbert Standing Jr. and Percy Standing. Actor Charles Wyndham was his uncle.

== Career ==
Standing, a popular leading man in the silent film era, appeared in more than 130 films between 1915 and 1948. He and Ronald Colman starred in the original classic The Dark Angel (1925), a film once lost but recently rediscovered. He delivered a memorable performance in Hell's Angels (1930) as the commanding officer who gets fed up with the cowardly antics of Ben Lyon and James Hall before sending them off on a deadly bombing mission.

== Filmography ==
- Business Is Business (1915) - Marquis
- A Mother's Atonement (1915, Short) - Wilbur Kent
- The Supreme Test (1915) - James Semple
- Bullets and Brown Eyes (1916) - Count Michael
- The Bugle Call (1916) - Capt. William Andrews
- The Beggar of Cawnpore (1916) - Capt. Guy Douglas
- The Wolf Woman (1916) - Franklin Walden
- Redeeming Love (1916) - Hugh Wiley
- The Waiting Soul (1917) - Dudley Kent
- The Auction of Virtue (1917) - Kirke
- The Soul of a Magdalen (1917) - Leland Norton
- The Law of the Land (1917) - Richard Harding
- To the Death (1917) - Jules Lavinne
- The Silence Sellers (1917) - Von Kolnitz
- Exile (1917) - Vincento Perez
- Rose of the World (1918) - Captain Harry English
- The Hillcrest Mystery (1918) - Hugo Smith
- The Life Mask (1918) - Woodruffe Clay
- The Glorious Adventure (1918) - Hiram A. Ward
- Out of the Shadow (1919) - Richard Steel
- The Woman on the Index (1919) - David Maber
- Paid in Full (1919) - Jimsy Smith
- The Marriage Price (1919) - Frederick Lawton
- Eyes of the Soul (1919) - Larry Gibson
- The Hushed Hour (1919) - Lord George Daw
- The Witness for the Defense (1919) - Henry Thresk
- A Temperamental Wife (1919) - Senator Newton
- The Isle of Conquest (1919) - John Arnold
- The Miracle of Love (1919) - Clive Herbert
- My Lady's Garter (1920) - Bruce Calhoun
- A Modern Salome (1920) - Harry Torrence
- Lifting Shadows (1920) - Hugh Mason
- Earthbound (1920) - Richard Desborough
- Blackmail (1920) - Richard Harding
- The Marriage of William Ashe (1921) - William Ashe
- The Journey's End (1921) - The Mill Owner
- The Iron Trail (1921) - Murray O'Neil
- The Bride's Play (1922) - Sir Fergus Cassidy
- Smilin' Through (1922) - John Carteret
- Isle of Doubt (1922) - Dean Deland
- The Inner Man (1922) - Thurlow Michael Barclay Jr
- The Hypocrites (1923) - Rev, Edgar Linnell
- The Lion's Mouse (1923) - Dick Sands
- Little Johnny Jones (1923) - The Earl of Bloomsburg
- Daytime Wives (1923) - Elwood adams
- Forgive and Forget (1923) - Mr. Cameron
- The Gold Diggers (1923) - Stephen Lee
- Secrets (1924) - Minor Role (uncredited)
- Pagan Passions (1924) - John Dangerfield
- The Rejected Woman (1924) - James Dunbar
- Vanity's Price (1924) - Richard Dowling
- Flames of Desire (1924) - Daniel Strathmore
- The Early Bird (1925) - George Fairchild
- The Reckless Sex (1925) - Carter Trevor
- The Teaser (1925) - Jeffry Loring
- The Dark Angel (1925) - Gerald Shannon
- Soiled (1925) - James P. Munson
- The Unchastened Woman (1925) - Hubert Knollys
- If Youth But Knew (1926) - Sir Ormsby Ledger
- The Canadian (1926) - Ed Marsh
- White Heat (1927) - Gilbert Gillman
- Thumbs Down (1927) - James Breen
- The City Gone Wild (1927) - Franklin Ames
- The Port of Missing Girls (1928) - Mayor McKibben
- The Price of Divorce (1928) - The Doctor
- The Flying Squad (1929) - Mark McGill
- Power Over Men (1929) - Émile Delacour
- Widecombe Fair (1929) - The Squire
- Hell's Angels (1930) - RFC Squadron Commander
- Such Is the Law (1930) - John W. Tunston
- Dracula (1931) - Surgeon (uncredited)
- The Silent Witness (1932) - Sir John Lawson—Barrister
- A Study in Scarlet (1933) - Capt. Pyke
- Design for Living (1933) - Max's Butler
- Sadie McKee (1934) - Alderson's Butler (uncredited)
- The Key (1934) - Officer (uncredited)
- The Girl from Missouri (1934) - Turner's Butler (uncredited)
- You Belong to Me (1934) - Magician (uncredited)
- British Agent (1934) - Englishman Talking to Carrister at Party (uncredited)
- Imitation of Life (1934) - Jarvis the Butler
- Limehouse Blues (1934) - Assistant Commissioner Kenyon
- Clive of India (1935) - Col. Townsend (uncredited)
- East of Java (1935) - Hunter (uncredited)
- Mary of Scotland (1936) - Sergeant-at-Arms
- Beloved Enemy (1936) - Thornton
- Law of the Underworld (1938) - Businessman at Meeting (uncredited)
- Kidnapped (1938) - Clansman (uncredited)
- Bulldog Drummond's Secret Police (1939) - Wedding Master of Ceremonies (uncredited)
- The Man in the Iron Mask (1939) - Doctor
- Bulldog Drummond's Bride (1939) - Ambulance Doctor (uncredited)
- They Shall Have Music (1939) - Minor Role (uncredited)
- Mr. Smith Goes to Washington (1939) - Senator Ashman (uncredited)
- Rulers of the Sea (1939) - Banker (uncredited)
- The Amazing Mr. Williams (1939) - Elevator Passenger (uncredited)
- The Night of Nights (1939) - Naval Commander (uncredited)
- Waterloo Bridge (1940) - Toff (uncredited)
- Escape to Glory (1940) - Man
- Pride and Prejudice (1940) - Committeeman (uncredited)
- The Long Voyage Home (1940) - British Naval Officer (uncredited)
- The Son of Monte Cristo (1940) - Chamberlain
- Free and Easy (1941) - Lord Wensley (uncredited)
- Rage in Heaven (1941) - Dr. McTernan (scenes deleted)
- Meet John Doe (1941) - Democrat (uncredited)
- They Dare Not Love (1941) - Cafe Patron (uncredited)
- International Lady (1941) - Minor Role (uncredited)
- Smilin' Through (1941) - Doctor (uncredited)
- This Above All (1942) - Doctor (uncredited)
- They All Kissed the Bride (1942) - Department Head (uncredited)
- Counter-Espionage (1942) - The Maitre d' (uncredited)
- Laugh Your Blues Away (1942) - Mr. Jamison
- Appointment in Berlin (1943) - Bartender (uncredited)
- Madame Curie (1943) - King Oscar (uncredited)
- A Guy Named Joe (1943) - English Colonel (uncredited)
- Passport to Destiny (1944) - Doctor (uncredited)
- Meet the People (1944) - Shipyard Executive (uncredited)
- Marriage Is a Private Affair (1944) - Butler (uncredited)
- Mrs. Parkington (1944) - Butler (uncredited)
- The Woman in the Window (1944) - Man at Club (uncredited)
- The Great John L. (1945) - (uncredited)
- Week-End at the Waldorf (1945) - Literary Type (uncredited)
- The Locket (1946) - Butler (uncredited)
- The Secret Heart (1946) - Butler (uncredited)
- The Sea of Grass (1947) - Gambler (uncredited)
- The Arnelo Affair (1947) - Member (uncredited)
- The Late George Apley (1947) - Trustee, Boston Waif Society (uncredited)
- The Private Affairs of Bel Ami (1947) - Count de Vaudrec
- Ivy (1947) - Assistant Chief Justice (uncredited)
- Lured (1947) - Asst. Medical Examiner (uncredited)
- Merton of the Movies (1947) - Club Member (uncredited)
- Green Dolphin Street (1947) - Government General (uncredited)
- If Winter Comes (1947) - London Doctor (uncredited)
- B.F.'s Daughter (1948) - F.W. White, Ainsley's Friend
