= Violet Reed =

American actress

- Born: Violet B. Williams; 1894; Chicago, Illinois, US
- Occupation: Actress

Violet Reed (born Violet Williams) was an American actress active in Hollywood during the silent era.

== Biography ==
Reed was born in Chicago, Illinois, to John Williams and Hanna Mattson. Her father appears to have died when she was young. She was educated in Galesburg, Illinois, and Philadelphia, Pennsylvania. She trained as an opera singer before making her way into vaudeville and then motion pictures in the early 1910s, beginning at Vitagraph and later working under contract at Biograph, Thanhauser, and Metro. In the early 1920s, her film career came to an end; she appears to have spent time traveling around Europe. It is unknown what became of her after that.

== Selected filmography ==
- The Man Who Lost Himself (1920)
- The Right to Lie (1919)
- The Panther Woman (1918)
- The Power and the Glory (1918)
- More Truth Than Poetry (1917)
- Exile (1917)
- The Silence Sellers (1917)
- To the Death (1917)
- The Undying Flame (1917)
- The Soul of a Magdalen (1917)
- The Eyes of the World (1917)
- The Black Butterfly (1916)
- The Gambler of the West (1915)
- Reapers of the Whirlwind (1915)
- Life's Changing Tide (1915)
- For Her Friend (1915)
- The Buckskin Shirt (1915)
- Felix Holt (1915)
- The Black Sheep (1915)
- Seekers After Romance (1915)
- The Heart of a Bandit (1915)
- The Birthday Ring (1913)
- Madonna of the Storm (1913)
- The Tongueless Man (1912)
- Tricked Into Happiness (1912)
- The Poor Relation (1912)
