= The Black Butterfly =

1916 film by Burton L. King

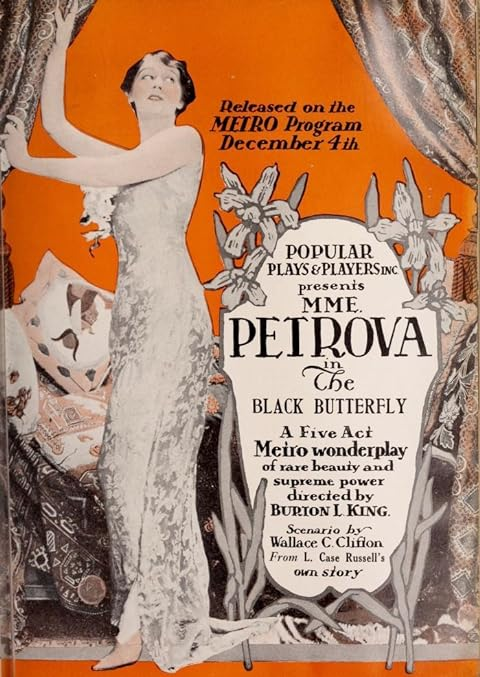
- Lobby poster
- Directed by: Burton L. King
- Written by: Olga Petrova (story); Lillian Case Russell (story); Wallace C. Clifton (scenario)
- Starring: Olga Petrova
- Cinematography: André Barlatier - French Wikipedia)
- Production companies: Popular Plays and Players
- Distributed by: Metro Pictures
- Release date: December 4, 1916
- Running time: 5 reels
- Country: United States
- Language: Silent (English intertitles)

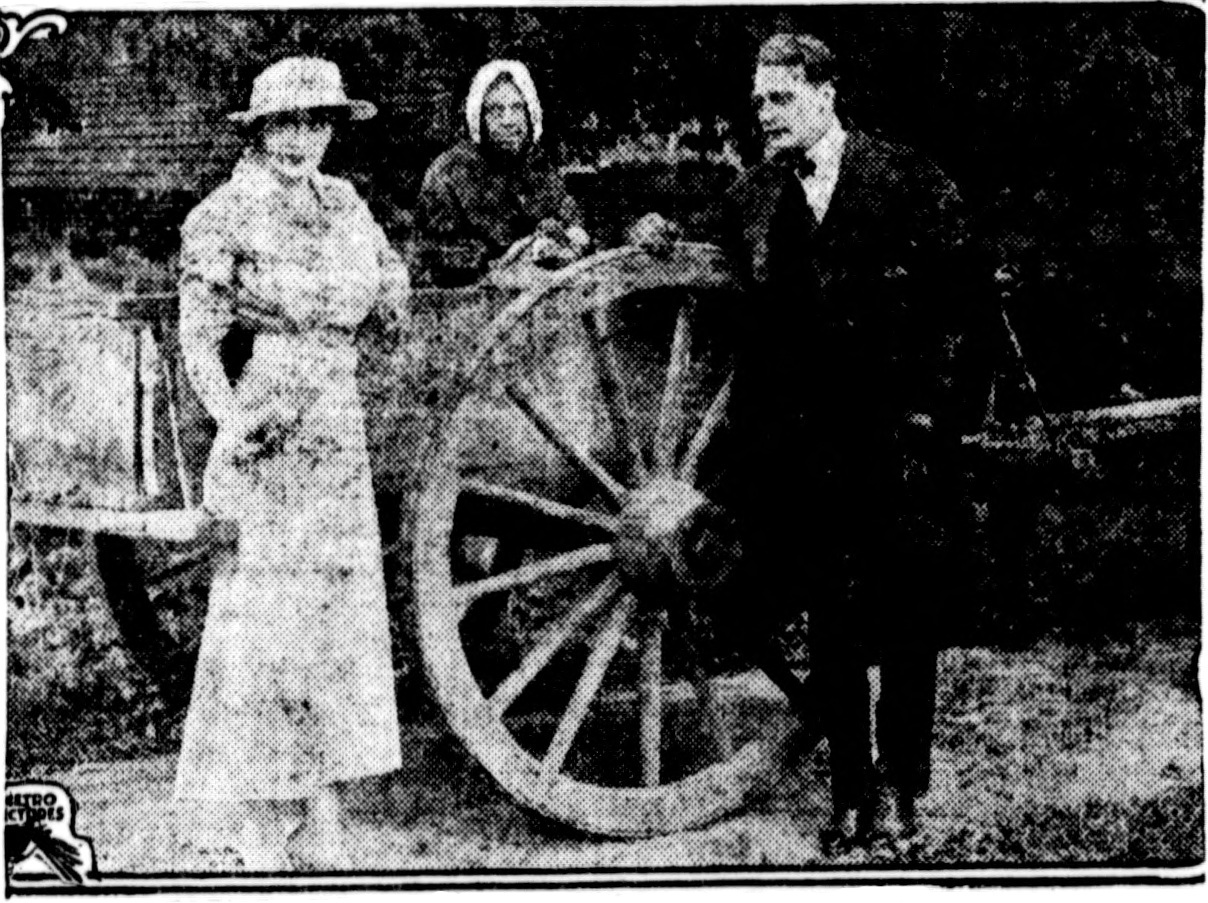
Scene from the film.

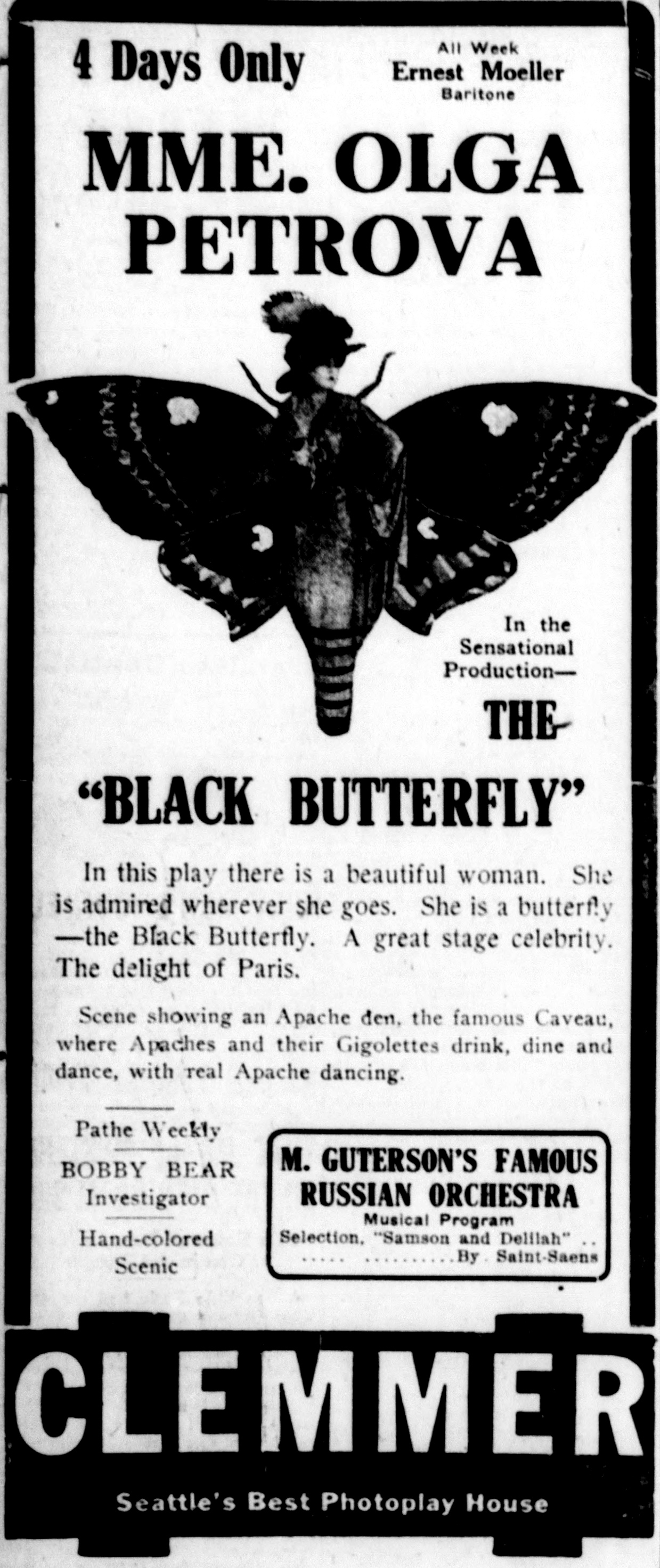
Newspaper advertisement

The Black Butterfly is a lost 1916 American silent drama film released by Metro Pictures, starring Olga Petrova. The last known copy was destroyed in the 1965 MGM vault fire. The extant footage was posted online in 2019.

== Cast ==
- Olga Petrova as Sonia Smirnov / Marie, The Convent Girl
- Mahlon Hamilton as Alan Hall
- Anthony Merlo as Girard
- Count Lewenhaupt as Lachaise
- Edward Brennan as Lord Braislin
- Violet Reed as Lady Constance Braislin
- John Hopkins as Don Luis Maredo
- Morgan Jones as Peter, Father of Sonia
- Norman Kerry as Vladimir (credited as Norman Kaiser)
- Roy Pilcher as Gaston Duval
- Evelyn Dumo as Ciel, Sonia's Maid
