= May Blossom (film) =

1915 film by Allan Dwan

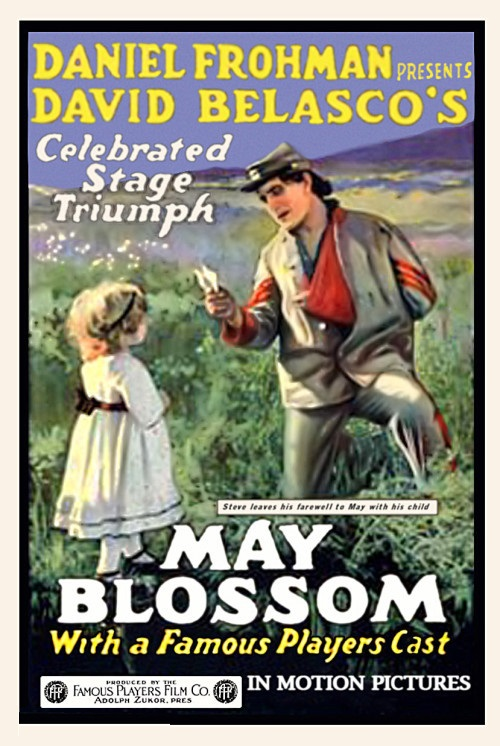
- Film poster
- Directed by: Allan Dwan
- Screenplay by: David Belasco
- Based on: May Blossom by David Belasco
- Produced by: Daniel Frohman
- Starring: Russell Bassett; Donald Crisp; Marshall Neilan; Gertrude Norman; Gertrude Robinson
- Cinematography: H. Lyman Broening
- Production company: Famous Players Film Company
- Distributed by: Paramount Pictures
- Release date: April 15, 1915
- Running time: 4 reels
- Country: United States
- Language: Silent (English intertitles)

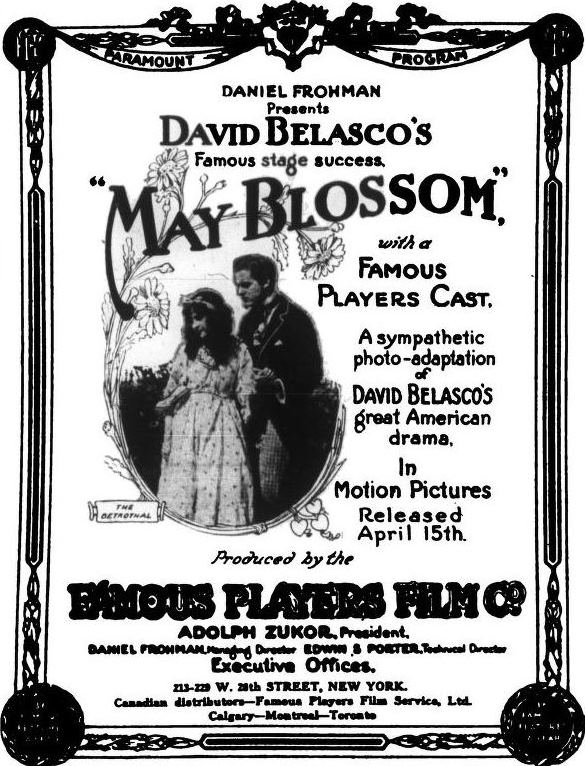
Famous Players/ Daniel Frohman Advertisement.

May Blossom is a 1915 American silent drama film directed by Allan Dwan and written by David Belasco based upon his 1884 play. The film stars Russell Bassett, Donald Crisp, Marshall Neilan, Gertrude Norman, and Gertrude Robinson. The film was released on April 15, 1915, by Paramount Pictures.

== Cast ==
- Russell Bassett as Tom Blossom
- Donald Crisp as Steve Harland
- Marshall Neilan as Richard Ashcroft
- Gertrude Norman as Aunt Deborah
- Gertrude Robinson as May Blossom

== See also ==
- List of films and television shows about the American Civil War
- List of Paramount Pictures films
