= The Little Diplomat =

1917 silent film

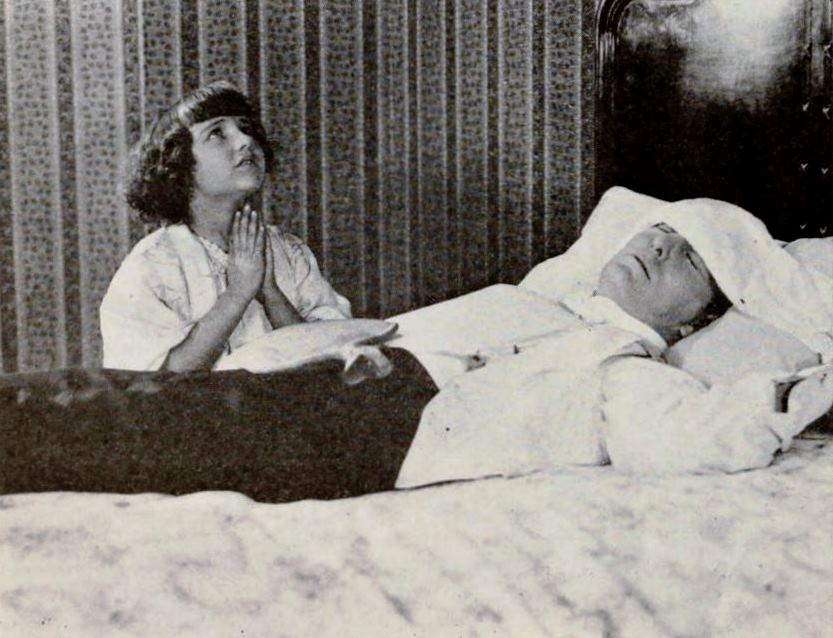
- Directed by: Stuart Paton
- Written by: Emma Bell Clifton
- Starring: Marie Osborne; Lydia Knott; William Welsh
- Production company: Diando Film Corporation
- Distributed by: Pathé Exchange
- Release date: June 15, 1919
- Running time: 50 minutes
- Country: United States
- Languages: Silent; English intertitles

The Little Diplomat is a 1919 American silent comedy film directed by Stuart Paton and starring Marie Osborne, Lydia Knott and William Welsh. A premiere for the film was held in Los Angeles, CA on August 6, 1919.

== Cast ==
- Marie Osborne as Little Marie
- Lydia Knott as Mrs. Bradley West
- William Welsh as Bradley West
- Jack Connolly as Trent Gordon
- Murdock MacQuarrie as Raymond Brownleigh
- Velma Clay as Hulda
- Albert MacQuarrie as Kendall
- Betty Compson as Phyllis Dare
- Ernest Morrison as George Washington Jones Jr.

== Preservation ==
The Little Diplomat is currently presumed lost. In February of 2021, the film was cited by the National Film Preservation Board on their Lost U.S. Silent Feature Films list.

== See also ==
- List of lost films

== Bibliography ==
- Robert B. Connelly. The Silents: Silent Feature Films, 1910-36, Volume 40, Issue 2. December Press, 1998.
