= A Grand Army Man =

1907 play by Belasco, Phelps and Short

The novel

A Grand Army Man is a play by David Belasco, Pauline Phelps and Marion Short. It played at the Stuyvesant Theatre in New York City in 1907 and 1908.

It played at the Hyperion Theatre. David Warfield starred. It toured in San Francisco.

The name refers to the Grand Army of the Republic, an organization of Union Army Civil War veterans. A novelization by Harvey Jerrold O'Higgins was published in 1908.
