= The Undying Flame =

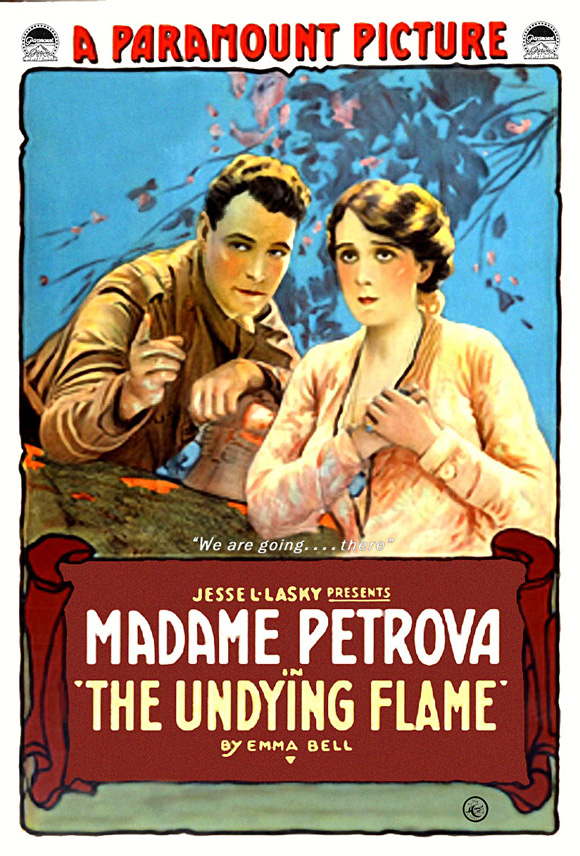
- Film poster
- Directed by: Maurice Tourneur
- Written by: Emma Bell Clifton (story); Charles E. Whittaker (scenario)
- Produced by: Jesse L. Lasky
- Starring: Olga Petrova
- Cinematography: John van den Broek
- Distributed by: Paramount Pictures
- Release date: May 24, 1917
- Running time: 5 reels
- Country: United States
- Languages: Silent film (English intertitles)

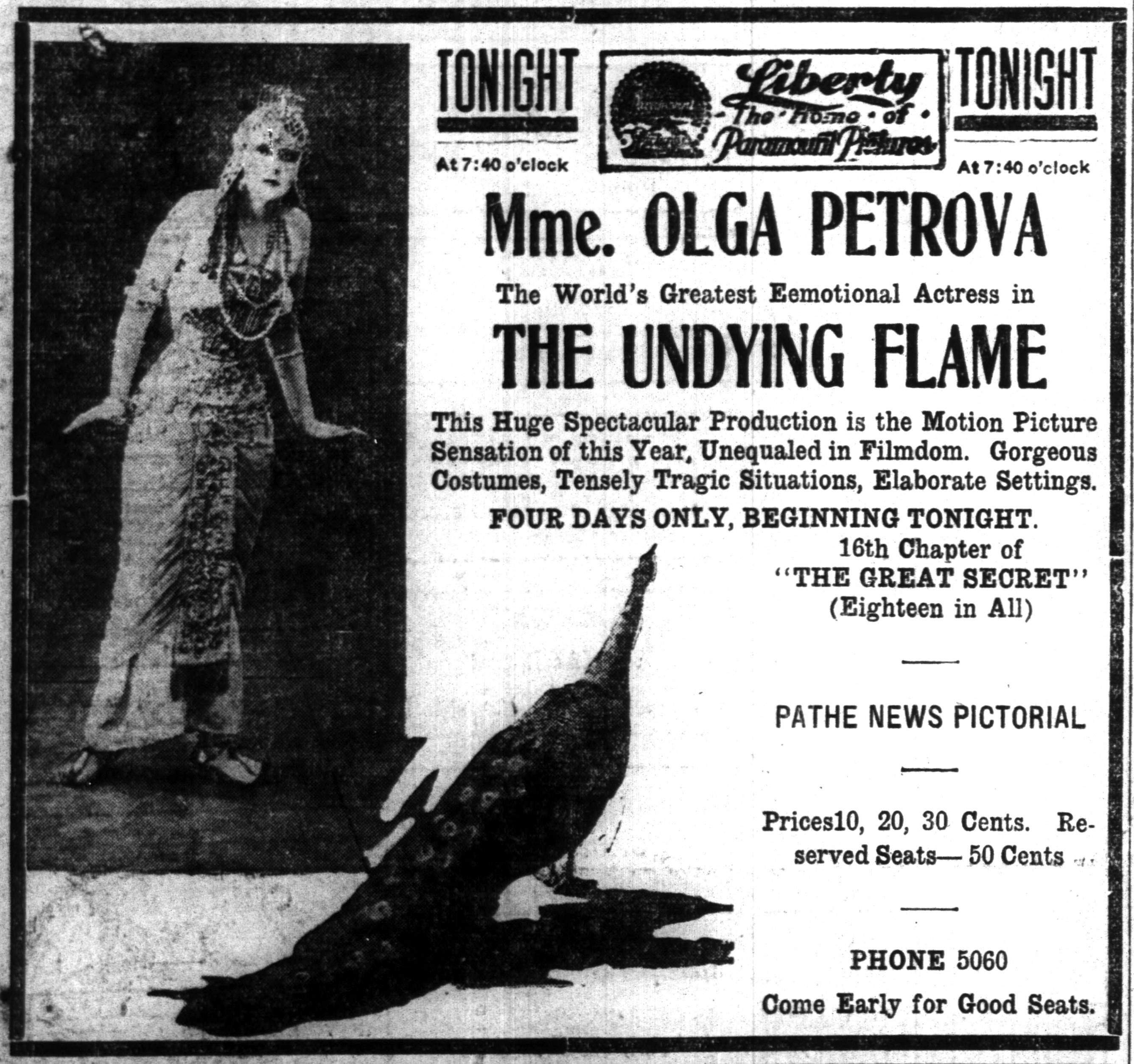
Newspaper advertisement

The Undying Flame is a lost 1917 American silent drama film directed by Maurice Tourneur, produced by Jesse Lasky and released by Paramount Pictures. This movie starred Olga Petrova, an English-born actress who became popular in silents playing vamps.

== Cast ==
- Olga Petrova as The Princess / Grace Leslie (*as Madame Olga Petrova)
- Edwin Mordant as The King
- Herbert Evans as The Architect
- Mahlon Hamilton as The Shepherd / Captain Paget
- Warren Cook as General Leslie
- Charles Martin as Colonel Harvey
- Violet Reed as Mrs. Harvey

== Production ==
Exterior scenes were taken on location in Florida and interiors were filmed at the Famous Players-Lasky Fort Lee studio, recently acquired from Paragon.

== Censorship ==
Before The Undying Flame could be exhibited in Kansas, the Kansas Board of Review required the elimination of the scene where the Princess' favorite maid is thrown to alligators, and all other scenes of alligators.

== Preservation ==
With no holdings located in archives, The Undying Flame is considered a lost film.

== See also ==
- The House That Shadows Built (1931 promotional film by Paramount with excerpt of this film)
