= To the Death (1917 film) =

1917 film directed by Burton L. King

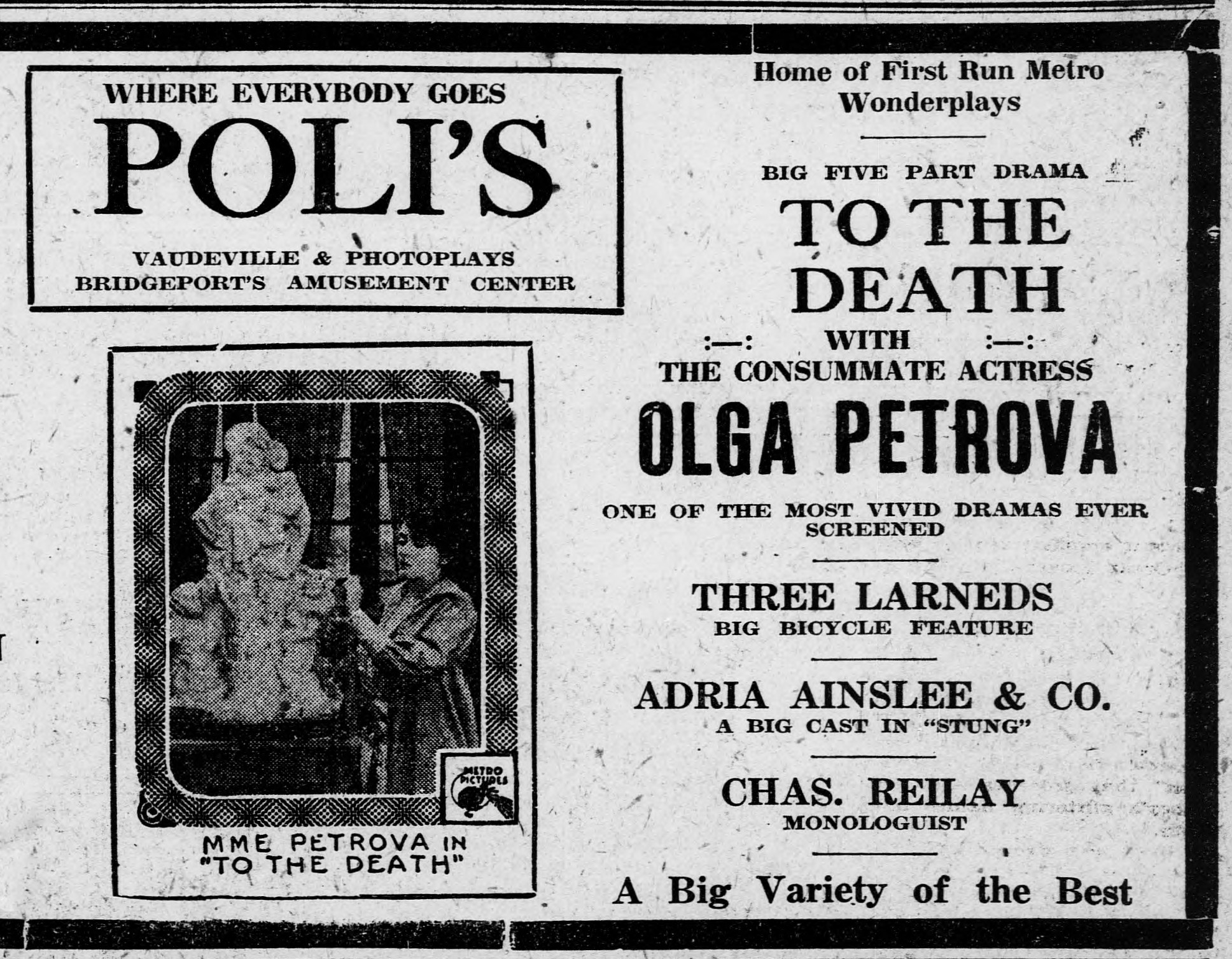
- Newspaper advertisement
- Directed by: Burton L. King
- Written by: Olga Petrova; Lillian Case Russell
- Starring: Olga Petrova
- Cinematography: Harry B. Harris
- Production company: Metro Pictures
- Distributed by: Metro Pictures
- Release date: August 27, 1917
- Running time: Five reels
- Country: United States
- Language: Silent (English intertitles)

To the Death is a 1917 American silent drama film directed by Burton L. King and released by Metro Pictures. The film is considered to be lost.

== Plot ==
As described in a film magazine, Bianca (Petrova) models in clay and makes laces for a living. She accepts an opportunity to go to Paris and receive an art education, promising to send for her sister Rosa (Brent) and mother. A secret service agent betrays Rosa, and Bianca hurries home. Upon the death of Rosa she swears vengeance. She promises to marry Lavinne (Standing), the secret service agent, if he will disclose Rosa's betrayer, and is horrified when Lavinne shows her the picture of Etienne (Hamilton), the man she loves. Etienne comes to her room and she plunges a dagger into his breast. Lavinne forces her to accompany him to a hotel room where he scornfully tells her that he won her by trickery, and of having used Etienne's assumed name to lure Rosa away from home. Lavinne's valet (Korlin) informs the police that Lavinne is a traitor to his country and he is arrested. Bianca returns to her studio where she finds Etienne recovering from his wound, and they face a future of happiness.

== Cast ==
- Olga Petrova as Bianca Sylva (credited as Mme. Olga Petrova)
- Mahlon Hamilton as Etienne Du Inette
- Wyndham Standing as Jules Lavinne
- Henry Leone as Antonio Manatelli
- Evelyn Brent as Rosa
- Violet Reed as The Woman of Mystery
- Marion Singer as Maria
- Boris Korlin as Valet

== Reception ==
Like many American films of the time, To the Death was subject to cuts by city and state film censorship boards. The Chicago Board of Censors cut two scenes of the woman with a dagger taking an oath of vengeance at an altar.

== See also ==
- List of lost films
