= The Reward of Patience =

1916 film by Robert G. Vignola

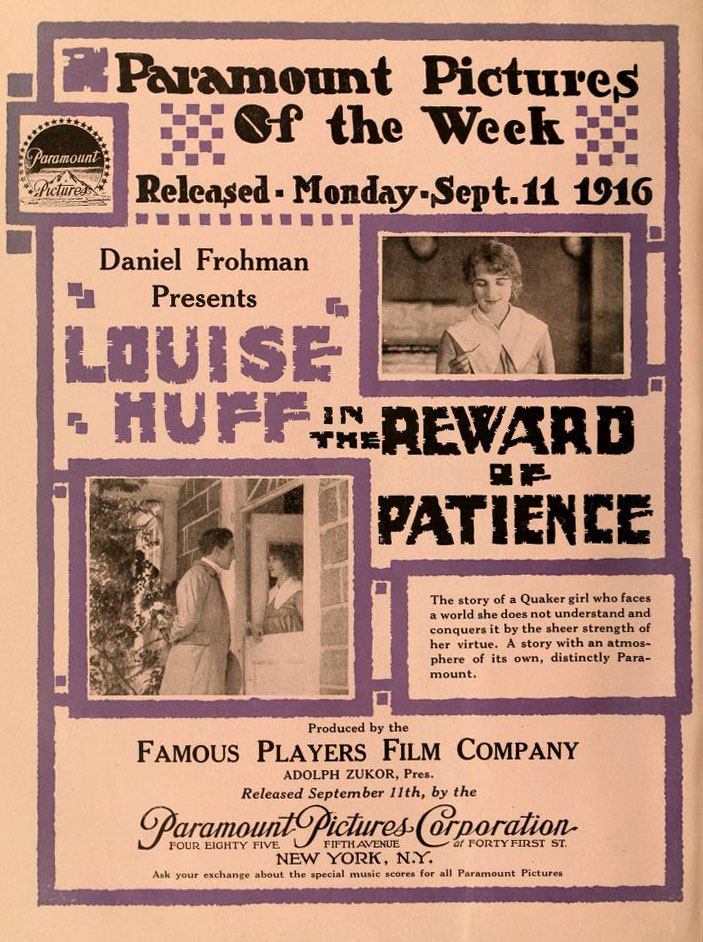
- Theatrical release poster
- Directed by: Robert G. Vignola
- Screenplay by: Shannon Fife
- Starring: Louise Huff; John Bowers; Lottie Pickford; Kate Lester; Adolphe Menjou; Gertrude Norman
- Cinematography: William Marshall
- Production company: Famous Players Film Company
- Distributed by: Paramount Pictures
- Release date: September 10, 1916
- Running time: 50 minutes
- Country: United States
- Language: English

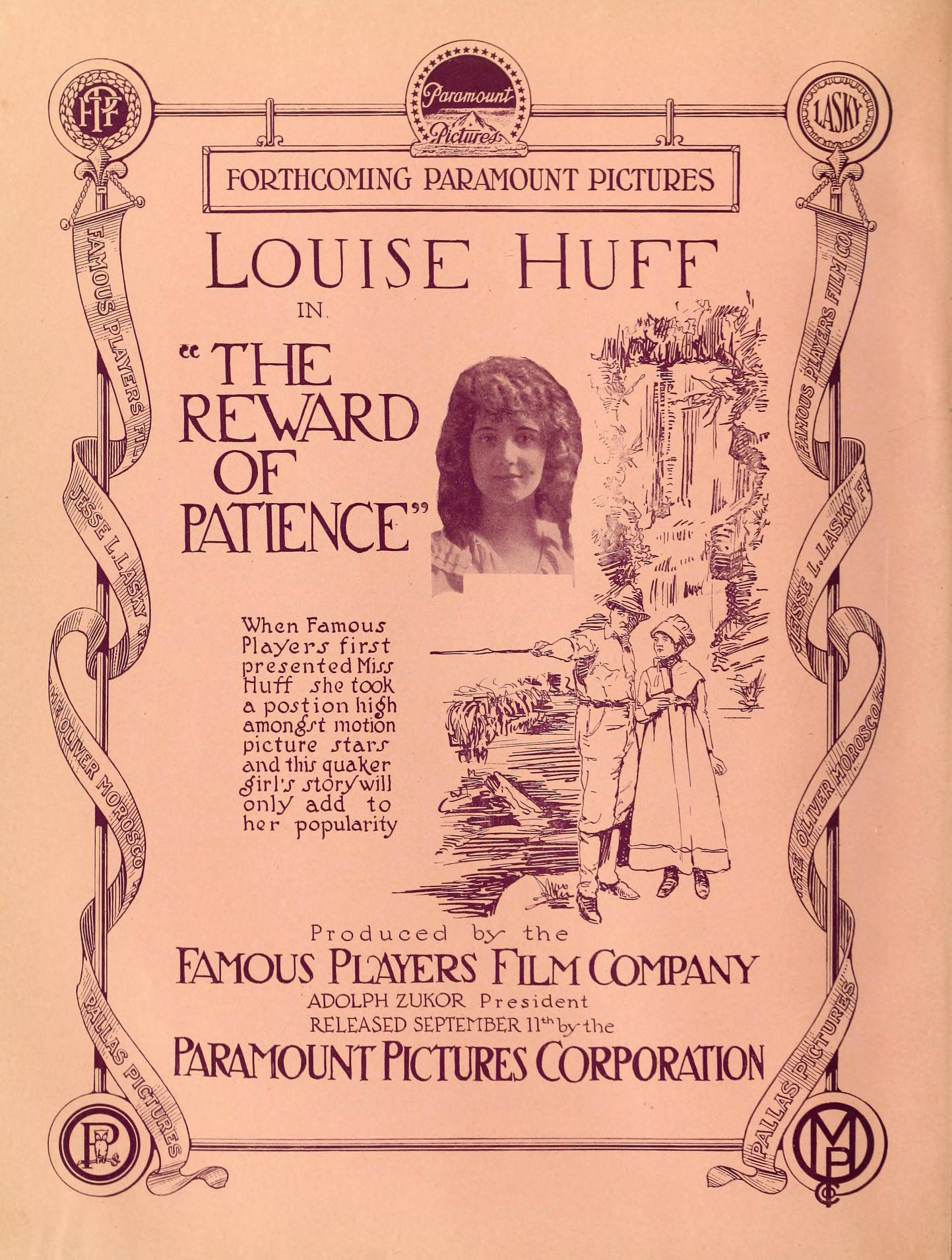
coming attractions announcement.

The Reward of Patience is a 1916 American drama silent film directed by Robert G. Vignola and written by Shannon Fife. The film stars Louise Huff, John Bowers, Lottie Pickford, Kate Lester, Adolphe Menjou and Gertrude Norman. The film was released on September 10, 1916, by Paramount Pictures.

== Cast ==
- Louise Huff as Patience
- John Bowers as Robert Penfield
- Lottie Pickford as Edith Penfield
- Kate Lester as Mrs. Penfield
- Adolphe Menjou as Paul Dunstan
- Gertrude Norman as Mother Osborn
