= Earthbound (1920 film) =

1920 film directed by T. Hayes Hunter

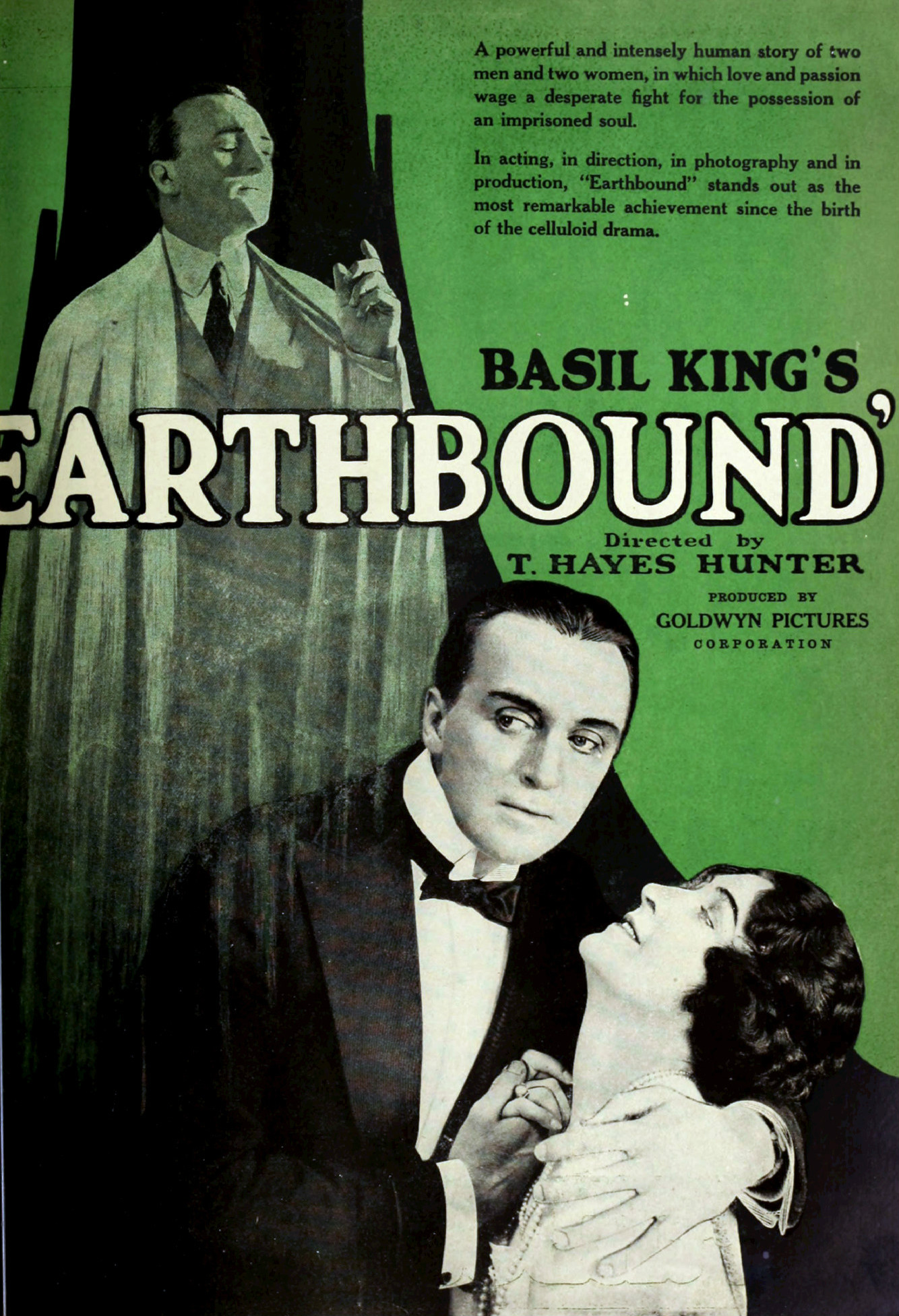
- Advertisement for the film on the October 23, 1920 issue of Exhibitors Herald (pg. 19)
- Directed by: T. Hayes Hunter; Claude Camp (assistant director)
- Written by: Edfrid A. Bingham
- Based on: The Ghost's Story by Basil King
- Produced by: Samuel Goldwyn; Rex Beach; Basil King
- Starring: Wyndham Standing; Mahlon Hamilton; Naomi Childers
- Cinematography: André Barlatier – (French Wikipedia)
- Edited by: J. G. Hawks; Alexander Troffey
- Production companies: Eminent Authors Pictures Inc. Goldwyn Pictures
- Distributed by: Goldwyn Pictures
- Release date: August 11, 1920
- Running time: 8 reels
- Country: United States
- Language: Silent (English intertitles)

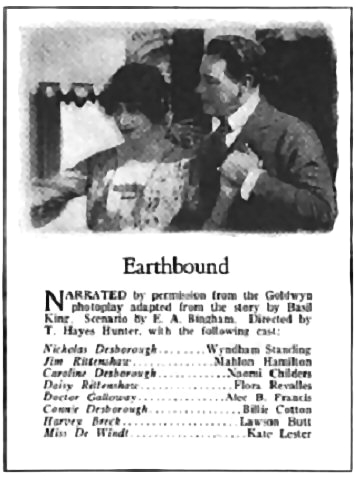
From Photoplay Magazine, November 1920

Earthbound is a 1920 American silent drama film directed by T. Hayes Hunter and starring Wyndham Standing, Mahlon Hamilton, and Naomi Childers. The film was written by Edfrid A. Bingham from a story by Basil King who also produced the film with cinematography by André Barlatier, film editing by J.G. Hawks and art direction from Cedric Gibbons.

The film was produced and released by Goldwyn Pictures on August 11, 1920.

== Plot ==
Daisy Rittenshaw's husband murders her lover when he discovers their affair. Her lover's ghost remains, unable to move on until he helps those whom he has wronged.

== Cast ==
- Wyndham Standing as Nicholas Desborough
- Mahlon Hamilton as Jim Rittenshaw
- Naomi Childers as Caroline Desborough
- Flora Revalles as Daisy Rittenshaw
- Alec B. Francis as Doctor Galloway
- Billie Cotton as Connie Desborough
- Lawson Butt as Harvey Breck
- Kate Lester as Miss De Windt
- Aileen Pringle (uncredited)

== Preservation ==
A print is prepared and preserved by MGM.
