= Paid Back =

1922 film directed by Irving Cummings

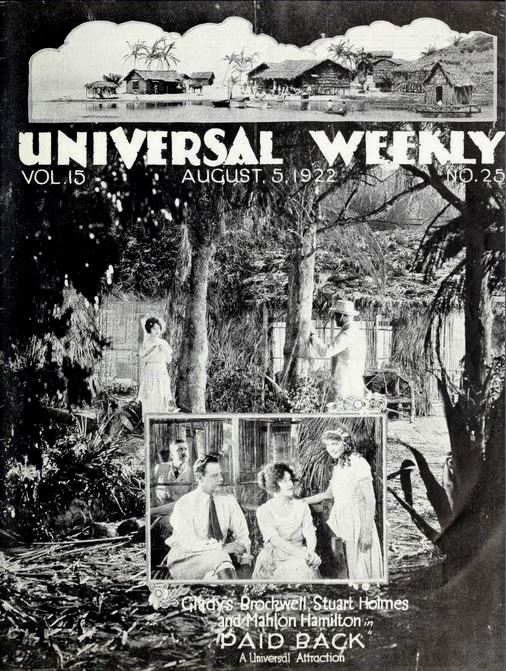
- Cover of Universal Weekly
- Directed by: Irving Cummings
- Screenplay by: Hope Loring (scenario)
- Story by: Louis D. Lighton
- Produced by: Carl Laemmle
- Starring: Gladys Brockwell; Mahlon Hamilton; Stuart Holmes
- Cinematography: William E. Fildew; Jackson Rose
- Production company: Universal Film Manufacturing Co.
- Release date: August 28, 1922 (US)
- Running time: 5 reels
- Country: United States
- Language: Silent (English intertitles)

Paid Back is a 1922 American silent melodrama film, directed by Irving Cummings. It stars Gladys Brockwell, Mahlon Hamilton, and Stuart Holmes, and was released on August 28, 1922.

== Cast ==
- Gladys Brockwell as Carol Gordon
- Mahlon Hamilton as David Hardy
- Stuart Holmes as Jack Gregory
- Lillian West as Dorothy Britton
- Kate Price as Carol's servant
- Edna Murphy as Eloise Hardy
- Arthur Stuart Hull as Jason Lockhart
- Wilfred Lucas as Ship captain
