= The Waiting Soul =

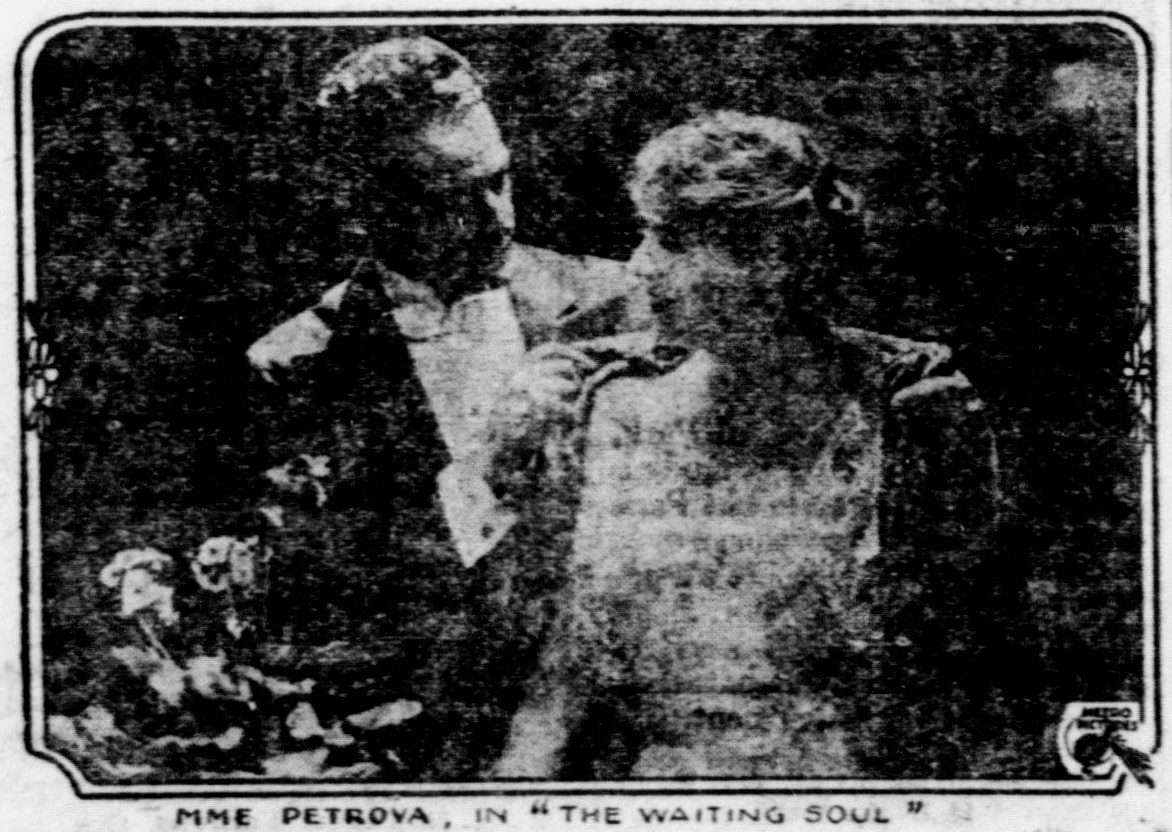
- Scene from a newspaper
- Directed by: Burton L. King
- Written by: Wallace Clifton; Marion Short
- Starring: Olga Petrova; Mahlon Hamilton; Mathilde Brundage
- Cinematography: George W. Hill
- Production companies: Popular Plays and Players
- Distributed by: Metro Pictures
- Release date: April 2, 1917
- Running time: 50 minutes
- Country: United States
- Languages: Silent; English intertitles

The Waiting Soul is a 1917 American silent drama film directed by Burton L. King and starring Olga Petrova, Mahlon Hamilton and Mathilde Brundage. It was filmed in St. Augustine, Florida at the Ponce de Leon Hotel.

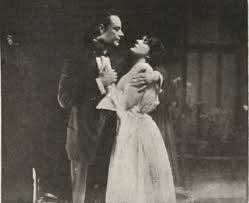
The Waiting Soul, starring Olga Petrova, photo from Saint Augustine Evening Record, April 12, 1917.

== Cast ==
- Olga Petrova as Grace Vaughan
- Mahlon Hamilton as Stuart Brinsley
- Mathilde Brundage as Mrs. Brinsley
- Wyndham Standing as Dudley Kent
- Lettie Ford as Mrs. Hargrove
- Anna Laughney as Marie D'Arcy
- Roy Pilcher as Willard Ashbrook
- Wilfred De Shields as John Hargrove

== Development ==
The film is based on the 1914 short story "The Waiting Soul" by Marion Short, and adapted for the screen by Wallace C. Clifton.

== Censorship ==
Before The Waiting Soul could be exhibited in Kansas, the Kansas Board of Review required the removal of all apartment scenes in London and all intertitles related to a pregnancy.

== Preservation ==
The film is preserved by MGM; and donated to unknown source.

== Bibliography ==
- Lowe, Denise. An Encyclopedic Dictionary of Women in Early American Films: 1895–1930. Routledge, 2014.
