= Out Yonder =

1919 film by Ralph Ince

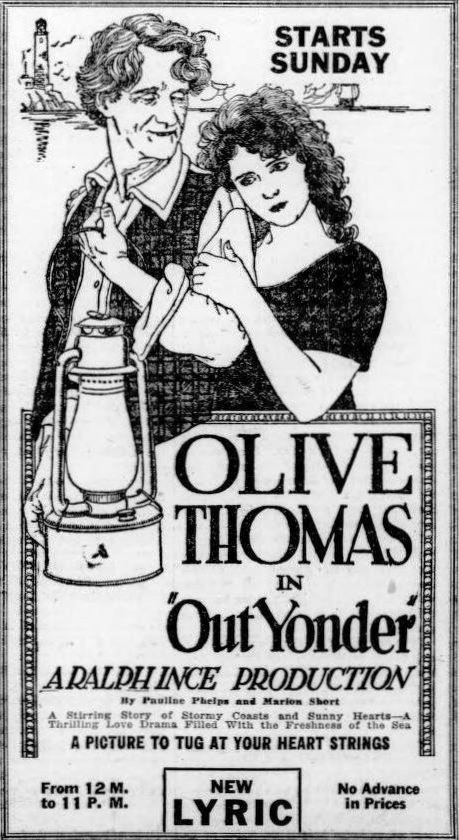
- Newspaper advertisement
- Directed by: Ralph Ince
- Written by: Edward J. Montagne
- Based on: the play The Girl from Out Yonder by Pauline Phelps and Marion Short c. 1906
- Produced by: Selznick Pictures Corporation
- Starring: Olive Thomas
- Production company: Selznick Pictures
- Distributed by: Select Pictures
- Release date: December 21, 1919
- Running time: 5-6 reels
- Country: United States
- Language: Silent (English titles)

Out Yonder is a 1919 American silent drama film directed by Ralph Ince and starring Olive Thomas. It was produced and released by Select Pictures.

== Plot ==
Off the shore of a rocky coastline, a large yacht sails. It is an Elmer family tradition to enjoy a leisurely, summer cruise on their yacht. The wealthy group enjoys cards and drinks below deck.

A guest of the Elmers, Miss Clarice Stapleton, has as her only aim to steer Edward Elmer, the yacht's owner, on a course toward matrimony. Edward asks her the whereabouts of his aunt, Mrs. Elmer, who has loved Elmer like a son. Clarice tells him that another guest, Reggie Hughes, has taken Mrs. Elmer along "as ballast" on "another of his dreadful rowing excursions".

Upon hearing this, Edward says he fully expects a disaster any day now. "And so ... the inevitable" happens, and both Reggie and Mrs. Elmer tip out of their rowboat. Fortunately, a young man in another rowboat comes along to pull them out of the water and bring them back to the yacht.

Once there, the Elmers discover that the "young man" is actually a young woman named Flotsam, the only child of the nearby lighthouse keeper. Flotsam explains that her name – literally "gift of the waves" – was given to her because on the day of her birth, a child's body was washed ashore by the sea. Her father, Captain Amos Bart, believed the little one's soul sailed into her.

Having heard legends about the lighthouse – but also clearly taken with Flotsam – Edward asks if he may come visit sometime. Flotsam says he may visit as often as he likes.

Later, Flotsam sits on her island and dreams of romance, sharing her thoughts with her pet turtle Nellie. When Edward arrives, she tells Nellie that her prince is here. Edward notices that Flotsam reads a lot of fairy stories, and she tells him that her dear, deceased mother once told her "there's a prince for every good girl and, sooner or later, he will come for her".

"How will you know it's him?" Edward asks, and Flotsam says she will just know.

Captain Bart – "a man tormented by a tragic secret" – arrives with Joey Clark, an old shipmate of the Captain who is now his assistant at the lighthouse. They see Flotsam with Edward, and when they are introduced, Captain Bart looks shocked. He then tells Joey that Edward looks just like "him".

At dinner that night, Captain Bart is more troubled than ever, and Flotsam wants to know why he is so sad, but he won't say. When they are alone, Joey tells the Captain that "the dead only come back in old wives' tales". But the Captain is less certain, and that every now and then the dead do return.

A storm begins to rage outside, and the Captain heads up to the lighthouse's lamp gallery to work. Downstairs, Joey wants to know when he can tell the Captain about him and Flotsam, to which she just laughs and says Nellie told her not to get involved with a sailor.

Joey is less than pleased, and thinks that now that Flotsam has met the rich Elmers, she'll want nothing to do with ordinary people like him. She tells him she will choose to do whatever she wants.

Coming down from the lamp gallery, Captain Bart sees a ghostly apparition outside the window, and his torment grows even worse. He confides to Joey that he has seen "the ghost of John Hamilton".

Some days later, Flotsam watches the yacht through a telescope. She sees a boat coming this way carrying Edward, Clarice, Reggie, and Mrs. Elmer. Although excited, she notices that their visit has Captain Bart worried. Reggie and Clarice head up to the top of the lighthouse where they spy Flotsam and Edward walking along the rocks.

Flotsam shows Edward her mother's grave, where he tells her that he lost his mother as well. Before that happened, his father had gone on a business trip from which he never returned. Believing he had abandoned her, Edward's mother took back her maiden name of Elmer, which he now bears—although his real name is Hamilton. Unknown to them, Joey overhears the entire conversation.

Meanwhile, Mrs. Elmer speaks to Captain Bart, offering to take Flotsam away and give her an upbringing that would allow her to blossom. Captain Bart will consider the matter. Clarice later comments to Edward that he seems attracted to Flotsam, or as Clarice calls her, "that little urchin".

As summer draws to a close, Edward tells Flotsam he must leave soon, but that he loves her. They share a kiss and she runs to tell her father that Edward wants to marry her.

Joey confronts Edward about taking Flotsam away, saying she isn't of his class and that his intentions can't be honorable. He tries to stab Edward, but Captain Bart breaks it up. He doesn't see the harm in Edward's wanting to marry Flotsam, until Joey reveals that Edward's real name is Hamilton and that Captain Bart killed Edward's father. Captain Bart can't deny the charge, but promises to reveal the truth tomorrow.

As Flotsam declares to her mother than she is so happy, and puts on a lovely dress, Edward worries about what he will learn tomorrow. Clarice overhears him telling his aunt about the murder.

Edward and Mrs. Elmer arrive the next day to speak with Captain Bart, who reveals in flashback that he once had John Hamilton aboard as a passenger. After a night of cards and heavy drinking, a fight ensued, and Hamilton was left dead. Joey and the Captain then tossed the body overboard. Captain Bart has lived all these years with feelings of remorse, his only wish being that Flotsam would never find out.

Given this revelation, Mrs. Elmer says that they obviously cannot go ahead with their plans for Flotsam. Until, that is, Captain reveals that Flotsam is not truly his daughter. It turns out that she was the child who washed ashore the day of her "birth". He then sends Flotsam away with the Elmers.

On the yacht that night, Clarice tells Flotsam that Captain Bart killed Edward's father, and Flotsam rushes back to shore to be with him and find out the truth of this slander. As she arrives, Joey confesses that it was actually he who killed John Hamilton that night, stabbing him with his knife. With no evidence, though, he is sure nothing will happen to him.

When Edward finds out what Clarice did, he orders the yacht to the island, but Joey has gone up to the lamp gallery and turned off the light. The yacht will crash on the rocks without it. But Flotsam lights a flare and runs out onto the rocks to warn the yacht away.

Captain Bart heads up to the lamp gallery to restart the light, while Joey stands contentedly outside of the gallery. He then sees the ghost of John Hamilton appear before him. Frightened to the core, he tumbles over the railing and is killed on the rocks below.

"And so", reads the title card, "two hearts that had found each other in storm and gloomy night were finally united", as Edward and Flotsam kiss.

== Cast ==
- Olive Thomas as Flotsam
- Huntley Gordon as Edward Elmer
- Marie Coverdale as Mrs. Elmer (as Mary Cloverdale)
- Louise Prussing as Clarice Stapleton
- John Smiley as Amos Bart
- Cyril Chadwick as Reggie Hughes
- Edward Ellis as Joey Clark

== Preservation ==
Prints are held at EYE Film Institute Netherlands and La Cineteca del Friuli.

Opening information on existing print: "The surviving copy of this film has credits and titles in Dutch. None of the original, English-language components are known to exist. As part of the restoration process, new credits were created with a look approximate to the era. The available titles were re-translated from Dutch, with some liberties taken when word-for-word translations did not accurately convey the intended meaning."

== Home media ==
The film was released on DVD in 2016 as part of Silent Hall of Fame's Silent Gems Collection.

In 2022, it was released on Blu-ray and DVD by Grapevine Video, with digital restoration and titles by Joseph Harvat, and a piano score composed and performed by David Drazin.
