= Idle Tongues =

1924 American silent drama film by Lambert Hillyer

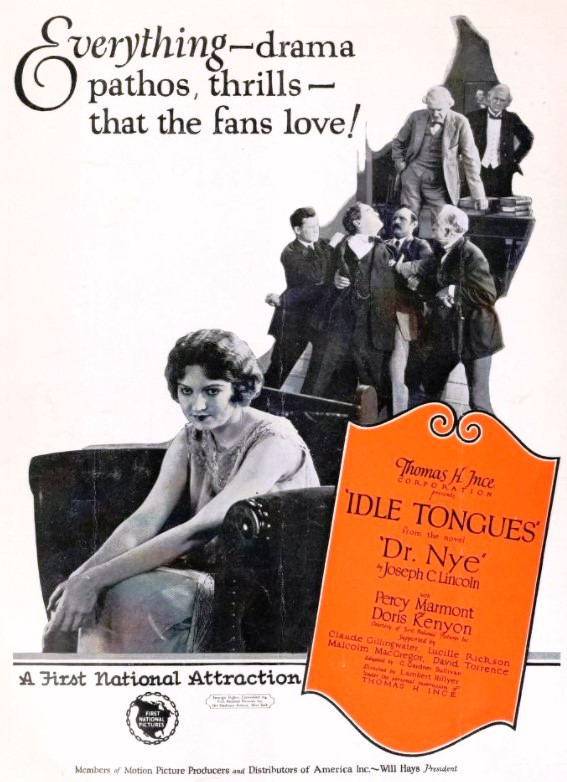
- Advertisement
- Directed by: Lambert Hillyer
- Written by: C. Gardner Sullivan
- Based on: Doctor Nye of North Ostable by Joseph C. Lincoln
- Produced by: Thomas H. Ince
- Starring: Percy Marmont; Doris Kenyon
- Cinematography: Karl Struss
- Production company: Thomas H. Ince Corporation
- Distributed by: First National Pictures
- Release date: December 21, 1924
- Running time: 60 minutes
- Country: United States
- Language: Silent (English intertitles)

Idle Tongues is a 1924 American silent drama film directed by Lambert Hillyer and produced by Thomas H. Ince, one of his last efforts before his death that year. It starred Percy Marmont and Doris Kenyon and was distributed by First National Pictures.

== Plot ==
As described in a review in a film magazine, Dr. Nye (Marmont) returns to Ostable after spending five years in prison for the theft of church funds. Daniel Copeland (Gillingwater), brother of the doctor’s dead wife Fanny (Clayton), wants to install a municipal water system, but he is opposed by Cyrenus Stone (Torrence), his arch enemy. The townspeople, with their propensity for gossip, turn against Dr. Nye with the exception of Katherine Minot (Kenyon), who loves him. Typhoid fever breaks out and Dr. Nye believes that pond water which is piped by Copeland's water system is responsible for it. He accuses Copeland and is mobbed by the townspeople. He calls on Copeland and discloses how he went to prison to save his dead wife's reputation, as she was the real thief. Copeland is overcome to learn that his daughter stole the church money. Katherine overhears the conversation and provides additional details of how Dr. Nye’s wife once schemed to win him away from her. Copeland has previously opposed the marriage of his daughter Faith (Ricksen) to Tom (McGregor), the son of his arch enemy. Dr. Nye forces him to approve the marriage. Dr. Nye finds happiness in marriage with Katherine.

== Cast ==
- Percy Marmont as Dr. Ephraim Nye
- Doris Kenyon as Katherine Minot
- Claude Gillingwater as Judge Daniel Webster Copeland
- Lucille Ricksen as Faith Copeland
- David Torrence as Cyrenus Stone
- Malcolm McGregor as Tom Stone
- Vivia Ogden as Althea Bemis
- Marguerite Clayton as Fanny Copeland
- Ruby Lafayette as Miss Pepper
- Dan Mason as Henry Ward Beecher Payson
- Mark Hamilton as Bluey Batcheldor
- Buck Black as Young Boy (uncredited)

== Preservation ==
With no copies of Idle Tongues located in any film archives, it is a lost film.
