= Wanted at Headquarters =

1920 film directed by Stuart Paton

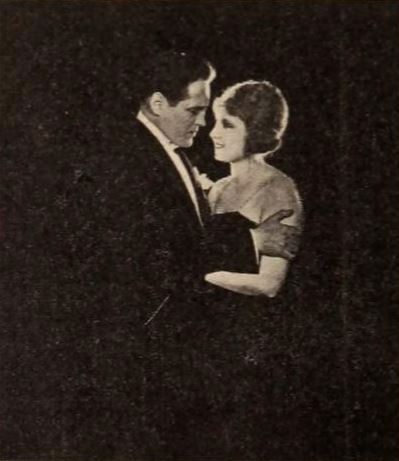
- Directed by: Stuart Paton
- Screenplay by: Wallace C. Clifton
- Story by: Edgar Wallace
- Starring: Eva Novak; Agnes Emerson; Lee Shumway; William Marlon; Lloyd Sedgwick; Howard Davies
- Cinematography: Harold Janes
- Production company: Universal Film Manufacturing Company
- Distributed by: Universal Film Manufacturing Company
- Release date: October 25, 1920
- Running time: 50 minutes
- Country: United States
- Language: Silent (English intertitles)

Wanted at Headquarters is a 1920 American silent drama film directed by Stuart Paton and written by Wallace C. Clifton. The film stars Eva Novak, Agnes Emerson, Lee Shumway, William Marlon, Lloyd Sedgwick, and Howard Davies. The film was released on October 25, 1920, by Universal Film Manufacturing Company. It is based on the 1918 novel Kate Plus Ten by Edgar Wallace.

== Cast ==
- Eva Novak as Kate Westhanger
- Agnes Emerson as Moya Flanbaugh
- Lee Shumway as Michael Pretherson
- William Marlon as George Flanbaugh
- Lloyd Sedgwick as Ralph Sapson
- Howard Davies as Colonel Westhanger
- George Chesebro as Tommy Carter
- Frank Clark as The Bishop
