= Mahlon Hamilton =

American actor (1880-1960)

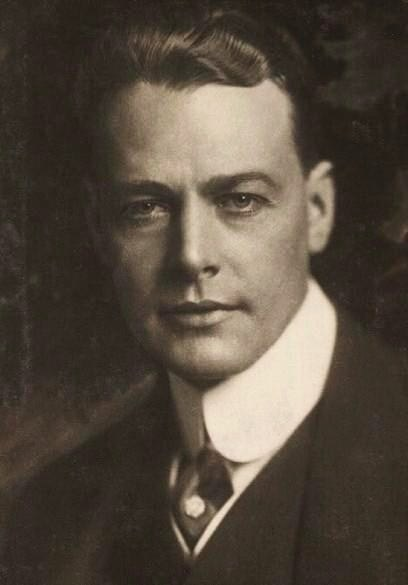
- Hamilton, c. 1910
- Born: June 15, 1880; Baltimore, Maryland, United States
- Died: June 20, 1960 (aged 80); Woodland Hills, Los Angeles, California, United States
- Occupation: Actor
- Years active: 1908–1950
- Spouse: Aleta Farnum (1918–1925)

Mahlon Preston Hamilton, Jr. (June 15, 1880 – June 20, 1960), was an American stage and screen actor. He was the son of a bartender born in Baltimore, Maryland, the eldest of four children, with the rest of the siblings being girls. Census records indicate his mother died sometime around 1899.

Hamilton served with the Maryland National Guard and attended the Maryland Agricultural College (today the University of Maryland, College Park) before turning to acting.

From 1908 through 1914, Hamilton appeared in such plays as The Great Question, Israel, When Claudia Smiles, The Chaperon, and Overnight. He began his film career during the silent era, appearing in more than 90 films between 1914 and 1950.

== Personal life and death ==
Hamilton married Aleta Farnum in 1918; the marriage ended in divorce in 1925.

He died in Woodland Hills, Los Angeles, California from cancer.

== Selected filmography ==
- The Final Judgment (1915)
- Molly Make-Believe (1916)
- The Eternal Question (1916)
- Extravagance (1916)
- The Black Butterfly (1916)
- Bridges Burned (1917)
- The Undying Flame (1917)
- The Law of the Land (1917)
- The Hidden Hand (1917)
- To the Death (1917)
- The Silence Sellers (1917)
- The Soul of a Magdalen (1917)
- The Waiting Soul (1917)
- The Red Woman (1917)
- More Truth Than Poetry (1917)
- The Danger Mark (1918)
- Adele (1919)
- Her Kingdom of Dreams (1919)
- Daddy-Long-Legs (1919)
- Playthings of Passion (1919)
- In Old Kentucky (1919)
- The Deadlier Sex (1920)
- Earthbound (1920)
- That Girl Montana (1921)
- The Truant Husband (1921)
- I Am Guilty (1921)
- Greater Than Love (1921)
- Under the Lash (1921)
- Ladies Must Live (1921)
- The Green Temptation (1922)
- Under Oath (1922)
- Peg o' My Heart (1922)
- Paid Back (1922)
- The Heart Raider (1923) (with Agnes Ayres)
- His Children's Children (1923)
- Little Old New York (1923)
- The Recoil (1924)
- Playthings of Desire (1924)
- Enemies of Youth (1925)
- Idaho (1925)
- The Wheel (1925)
- The Other Woman's Story (1925)
- Morganson's Finish (1926)
- Life's Crossroads (1928)
- The Single Standard (1929)
- Rich People (1929)
- Code of Honor (1930)
- Western Limited (1932)
- Mississippi (1935)
- Madame X (1937)
