= Dolf Wyllarde =

English writer

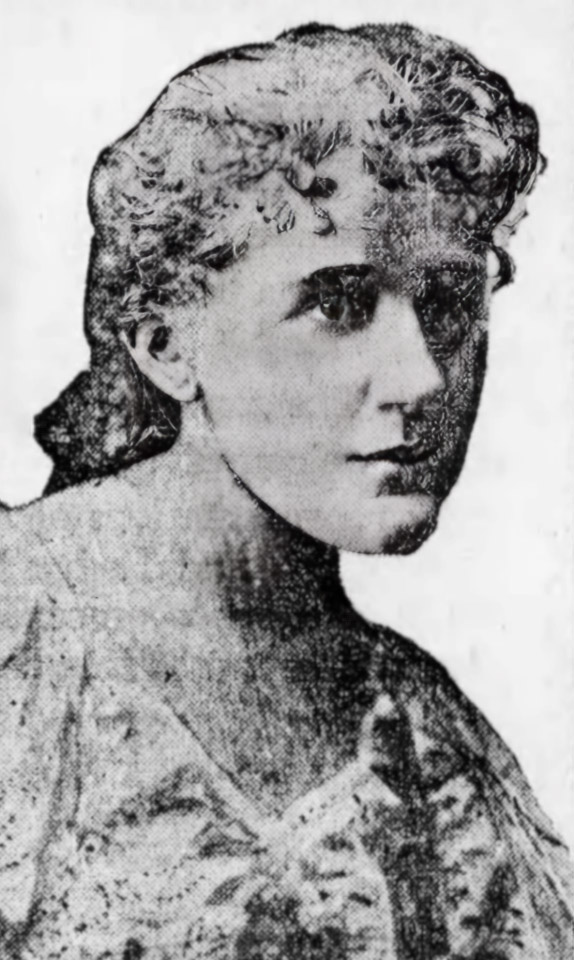
- Portrait of Dolf Wyllarde, c. 1902
- Born: Dorothy Margarette Selby Lowndes; 3 April 1871
- Died: 10 May 1950 (aged 79)
- Education: King's College London
- Occupations: Author; Journalist
- Writing career
- Pen name: Dolf Wyllarde
- Period: 1897–1939
- Genre: Fiction

Dorothy Margarette Selby Lowndes, writing as Dolf Wyllarde (3 April 1871 – 10 May 1950) was a British journalist and a writer of verse and fiction. From 1897 to 1939, she was known to publish in excess of 30 books, including novels, stories and children's literature. Numerous reviews of her work mistakenly referred to her as a male due to misunderstanding of her chosen name, with some believing it to be a pen name.

She was described by one newspaper as being "one of the pioneers in the latest phase of English fiction" and as "a new power in the fiction world, a power to be reckoned with". Little is known about her private life and she died a spinster in May 1950.

== Career ==
Born on 3 April 1871, she was educated at King's College London. She described herself as a London correspondent, sports editor, reporter and a paragraphist. In 1902, after suffering from overwork, she travelled to South Africa to recover her health. Throughout her career, she published over 30 books between 1897 and 1939, encompassing story collections, children's books and numerous novels.

Her 1902 novel The Story of Eden was highly praised by New York's The Brooklyn Daily Eagle as one of the most impressive novels recently produced by England. Wyllarde later explained that the novel was inspired by her visit to South Africa in 1889, a trip she took after suffering a breakdown from excessive work. She began writing the novel while in Wynberg and continued during her journey back to England. Despite her illness, she credited her journalism background for her ability to write swiftly and persistently, regardless of her physical or mental state, emphasising that journalism was an invaluable training ground for writers.

The Brooklyn Daily Eagle also later recognised her in July 1907 as a pioneer in the evolving landscape of English fiction. Her novel Captain Amyas, described as "a strong, masterly piece of fiction", marked her emergence as a force in the literary world. However, her 1908 novel Rose-White Youth, a love story about a 15-year-old girl, represented a departure from her typically realistic and straightforward style. The Brooklyn Daily Eagle suggested that her regular readers might have found it somewhat subdued, although acknowledged many would appreciate the style.

In 1913, Wyllarde was elected a Fellow of the Royal Geographical Society. Her literary work also included poetry, with her poem Rondeaux d'Amour featured in volume 4 of The Yellow Book and she also published two other collections of poetry. Her 1916 novel Exile: an outpost of empire was the basis of a 1917 American film and The Holiday Husband was filmed in 1920 featuring Adeline Hayden Coffin.

== Personal ==
During the early 20th century, there was speculation as to whether her name was a pen name, which was a commonly held view according to The Brooklyn Daily Eagle in May 1902. Responding to the suggestion, Wyllarde conveyed her amusement "by the incredulity cast" on her name, assuring those who doubted it as being her actual name that her own friends could "testify as to its extreme suitability" and that she was not able to imagine being named anything other than Dolf. She would also sometimes be incorrectly referred to as a male writer, with critics believing she was a man and the press congratulating "Mr Wyllarde" on "his new and instant success".

Little is known about her life, except that she lived at Old Mixon Manor near Weston-super-Mare. She was boarding with several other people in Weymouth, Dorset at the time of the 1911 census. She made several summer trips by ship to Marseille over a period of several years in the 1930s, such as in July 1931 at the age of 60, June 1932 at the age of 61, and in July 1933.

Wyllarde died a spinster on 10 May 1950, leaving effects worth just over £49443.
