= Gertrude Norman =

American actress

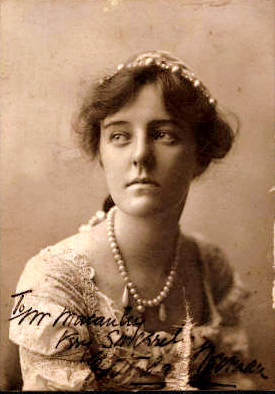
- Born: 19 May 1851; London, England
- Died: 20 July 1943 (aged 95); Hollywood, California
- Resting place: Hollywood Forever Cemetery
- Occupation: American silent film actress
- Years active: 1911-1936

Gertrude Norman (May 19, 1848 or 1851 – July 20, 1943), was an English/American theater and Hollywood silent film actress. She is credited with being in 44 films between 1911 and 1936, and was a screenwriter and director for early silent films. She appeared in four films with sound, making her one of the oldest actresses to perform during the silent and sound eras.

Norman was born in London, England. One of her early films from 1910 was rediscovered in a sea chest in the 2000s. She played a "mother" role in The Birth of a Nation. By the time Norman made her first "talkie" she was already in her 80s and played the part of a grandmother.

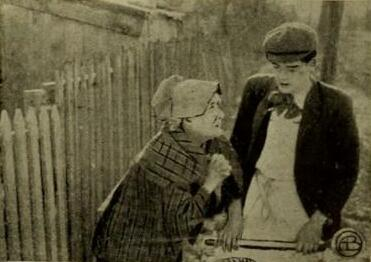
Gertrude Norman and Robert Harron in The Tender Hearted Boy

She is not to be confused with Gertrude "Toto" Norman (c. 1880–1961), an actress of the same time period as well as secretary and companion to the American opera singer Marcia Van Dresser, or with a children's book author Gertrude Norman.

== Filmography ==
| Year | Title | Role | Notes |
|---|---|---|---|
| 1911 | The Chief's Talisman | | Short |
| 1911 | Lucia's Broken Romance | The Old Woman | Short |
| 1911 | His Baby's Doll | The Old Woman | Short |
| 1911 | The Coward (I) | Jim's Mother | Short |
| 1912 | The Lord and the Peasant | | Short |
| 1912 | The Harbinger of Peace | Farmer Wilson's Unmarried Daughter | Short |
| 1912 | The Informer | | Short |
| 1913 | The Tender Hearted Boy | Miser | Short |
| 1914 | The Unwelcome Mrs. Hatch | Old Agnes | |
| 1914 | One of Millions | Mother Kubelow | |
| 1915 | The Foundling | | Scenes Deleted |
| 1915 | May Blossom | Aunt Deborah | |
| 1915 | Fanchon the Cricket | Old Fadette | |
| 1915 | The Pretty Sister of Jose | Their Grandmother | |
| 1915 | A Girl of Yesterday | Aunt Angela | |
| 1916 | Molly Make-Believe | Grandmother Meredith | |
| 1916 | The Feud Girl | Sue Bassett | |
| 1916 | The Reward of Patience | Mother Osborn | |
| 1917 | Heart's Desire | Mother Mathilde | |
| 1917 | The Adopted Son | Mrs. Conover | |
| 1917 | Persuasive Peggy | Peggy's Mother | |
| 1918 | The Studio Girl | Mrs. Daw | |
| 1918 | The Unbeliever | Marianne Marnholm | |
| 1919 | An Innocent Adventuress | Mrs. Cribbley | |
| 1919 | Widow by Proxy | Sophronia Pennington | |
| 1919 | Strictly Confidential | Elder Aunt | |
| 1920 | The Brand of Lopez | Marianna | |
| 1921 | Partners of the Tide | Grandma Baker | |
| 1921 | Beach of Dreams | La Comtesse de Warens | |
| 1921 | A Voice in the Dark | Mrs. Lydiard | |
| 1921 | Little Italy | Anna | |
| 1922 | A Game Chicken | Señora Juanita Martinez | |
| 1924 | The Right of the Strongest | Aunt Millie Davis | |
| 1924 | The Age of Innocence | | |
| 1927 | The King of Kings | Undetermined Role | Uncredited |
| 1929 | The Greene Murder Case | Mrs. Tobias Greene | |
| 1932 | If I Had a Million | Idylwood Resident | Uncredited |
| 1932 | The Sign of the Cross | Christian | Uncredited |
| 1933 | He Learned About Women | Suzette | |
| 1933 | Cradle Song | Tornero No. 1 | |
| 1934 | The Trumpet Blows | Grandma Albrentez | |
| 1935 | The Crusades | | Uncredited |
| 1936 | The Plainsman | | Uncredited |
