= Persuasive Peggy =

1917 silent film

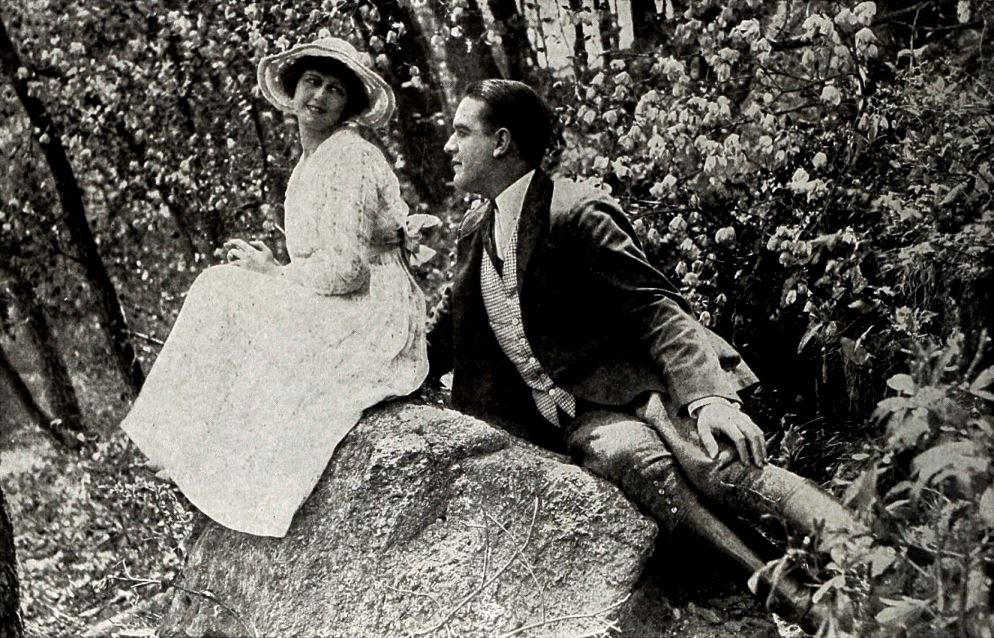
- Still with Hyland and Davidson
- Directed by: Charles Brabin
- Written by: Charles Brabin
- Based on: Persuasive Peggy by Maravene Thompson
- Starring: Peggy Hyland; William B. Davidson; Mary Cecil
- Cinematography: George W. Lane
- Edited by: Henry A. Butterfield
- Production company: Mayfair Film Corporation
- Release date: November 1917
- Running time: 60 minutes
- Country: United States
- Language: Silent (English intertitles)

Persuasive Peggy is a 1917 American silent comedy film directed by Charles Brabin and starring Peggy Hyland, William B. Davidson and Mary Cecil.

== Cast ==
- Peggy Hyland as Peggy Patton
- William B. Davidson as Ed Trowbridge
- Mary Cecil as Belle Newell
- Gertrude Norman as Peggy's Mother
- Charles Sutton as Peggy's Father
- Jules Cowles as Head Farm Hand
- Arthur Housman as Percy Pipp
