= Adelaide Thurston =

American stage actress (1871–1958)

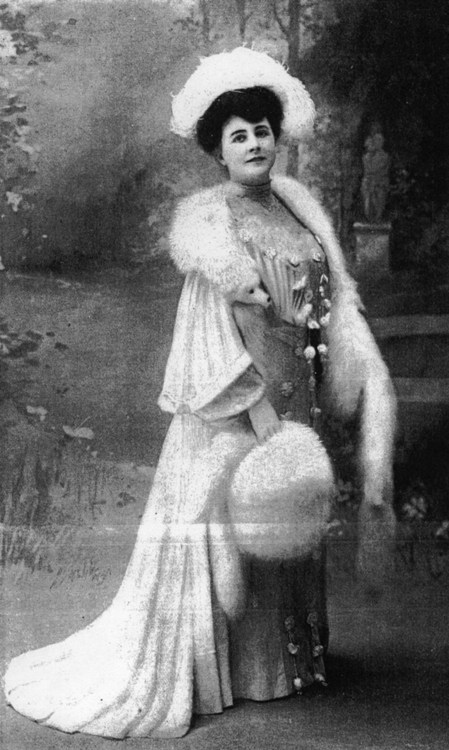
- Thurston in the July 1905 edition of Cosmopolitan
- Born: Adelaide Belle Sawyer; October 7, 1871; Red Wing, Minnesota, US
- Died: February 10, 1958 (aged 76); New Jersey, US
- Occupation: Stage actress

Adelaide Thurston (born Adelaide Belle Sawyer; October 7, 1871 – February 10, 1958) was an American stage actress.

== Early life ==
Thurston was born the second of four children on October 7, 1871, in Red Wing, Minnesota to Methodists Ruemma Sawyer and Harridon S. Sawyer, an American Civil War veteran and carpenter. Thurston graduated from Duluth High School in June 1888, and became a teacher.

== Career ==
Thurston began her acting career in local plays and stage readings between the 1880s and 1895. On June 25, 1895, she left Duluth to pursue acting in New York City. In 1897, she took a job at a stock company in Pittsburgh alongside filmmaker Harrish Ingraham. That same year, on December 25, she married Arthur W. Little in New York City.

Her first acting role was in a play titled Alabama. Later, she acted in A Texas Steer by Charles H. Hoyt. Her breakthrough role was in early 1899 in The Little Minister by J. M. Barrie. In 1907, she played a role in Contrary Mary. That same year, she also starred in The Girl from Out Yonder by Pauline Phelps. In 1922, she spoke out, urging women to vote for major political parties.

Thurston died in New Jersey, on February 10, 1958, aged 76.
