= Emma Bell Clifton =

American screenwriter during the silent film era

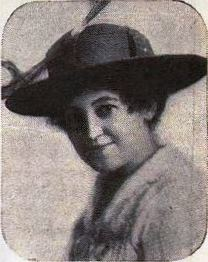
- Born: Emma Bell McGraw; 1874; Pennsylvania, U.S.
- Died: August 3, 1922; Los Angeles, California, U.S.
- Occupation(s): Screenwriter, author
- Spouse: Wallace C. Clifton

Emma Bell Clifton (1874–1922) was a screenwriter during the silent film era in the United States. She wrote for various studios, including Vitagraph and Universal Studios.

Her husband was screenwriter Wallace C. Clifton. The pair had a daughter, Emma Clifton Bucci, who worked as an actress from around 1913 to 1917.

Emma Bell Clifton died from a heart attack at her home in Los Angeles on August 3, 1922. She was living at the Virginia Apartments on Hollywood Boulevard after recently moving to Hollywood to serve as Olga Petrova's agent.

== Screenwriter ==
- The Undying Flame (1917)
- The Little Diplomat (1919)
- Silkless Banknote (1920)
- The Blue Pearl (1920)
- The Smart Sex (1921)
