= Joseph C. Lincoln =

American writer (1870–1944)

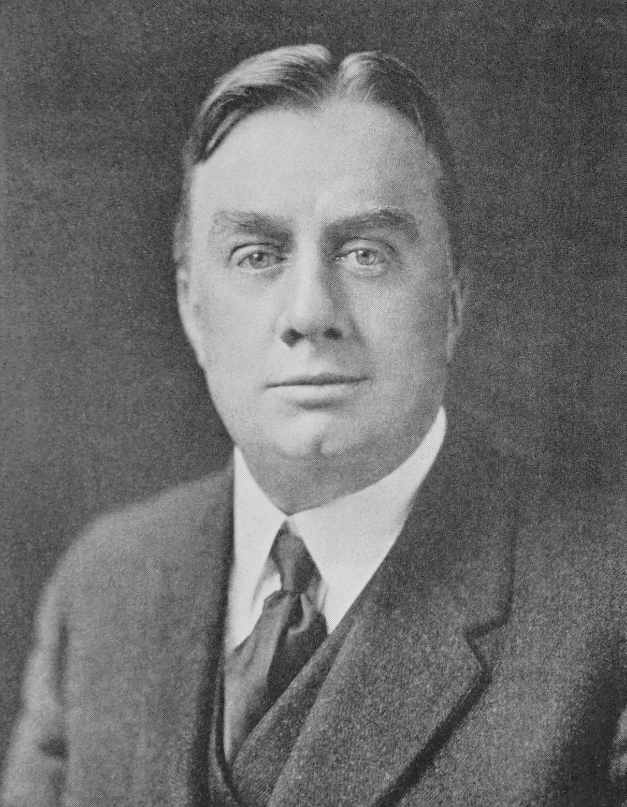

Joseph Crosby Lincoln (February 13, 1870 – March 10, 1944) was an American author of novels, poems, and short stories, many set in a fictionalized Cape Cod.

== Biography ==
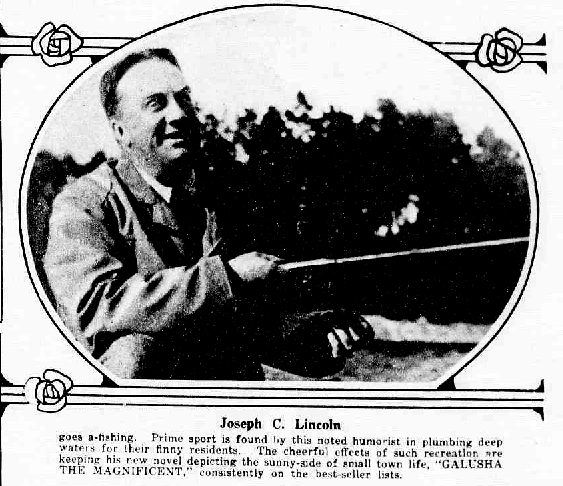
Newspaper photo of Lincoln fishing

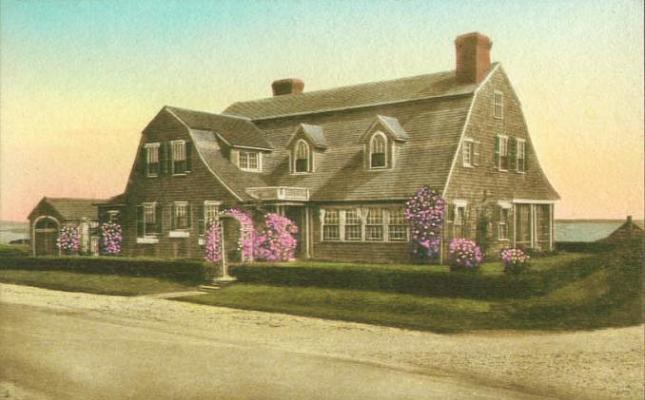
"Cross Trees" in c. 1920

Lincoln was born on February 13, 1870, in Brewster, Massachusetts, on Cape Cod, and his mother moved the family to Chelsea, Massachusetts, a manufacturing city outside Boston, after the death of his father. Lincoln's literary career celebrating "old Cape Cod" can partly be seen as an attempt to return to an Eden from which he had been driven by family tragedy. His literary portrayal of Cape Cod can also be understood as a pre-modern haven occupied by individuals of old Yankee stock which was offered to readers as an antidote to an America that was undergoing rapid modernization, urbanization, immigration, and industrialization. Lincoln was a Republican and a Universalist.

Lincoln's work frequently appeared in popular magazines such as the Saturday Evening Post and The Delineator. Lincoln was aware of contemporary naturalist writers, such as Frank Norris and Theodore Dreiser, who used American literature to plumb the depths of human nature, but he rejected this literary exercise. Lincoln claimed that he was satisfied "spinning yarns" that made readers feel good about themselves and their neighbors. Six films and a short were based on his work.

Upon becoming successful, Lincoln spent his winters in northern New Jersey, near the center of the publishing world in Manhattan, but summered in Chatham, Massachusetts. In Chatham, he lived in a shingle-style house named "Crosstrees" that was located on a bluff overlooking the Atlantic Ocean.

Lincoln died on March 10, 1944, at the age of 74, in Winter Park, Florida.

== Major works ==
The Silver Sheet, a studio publication promoting Thomas Ince Productions, cover illustration of "Idle Tongues" from J. C. Lincoln's Dr. Nye

- Cape Cod Ballads and Other Verse (1902)
- Cap'n Eri: A Story of the Coast (1904) (adapted into the 2009 film The Golden Boys)
- Partners of the Tide (1905)
- Mr. Pratt (1906)
- Cape Cod Stories (1907)
- Cy Whittaker's Place (1908)
- Our Village (1909)
- Keziah Coffin (1909)
- The Depot Master (1910)
- Cap'n Warren's Wards (1911)
- The Woman-Haters: A Yarn of Eastboro Twin-Lights (1911) (adapted into the 2010 film The Lightkeepers)
- The Postmaster (1912)
- The Rise of Roscoe Paine (1912) (adapted into the 1922 film No Trespassing)
- Mr. Pratt's Patients (1913)
- Cap'n Dan's Daughter (1914)
- Kent Knowles: Quahaug (1914)
- Thankful's Inheritance (1915)
- Mary-'Gusta (1916)
- Extricating Obadiah (1917)
- "Shavings" (1918) (adapted into a 1920 play by Pauline Phelps and Marion Short)
- The Portygee (1920)
- Galusha the Magnificent (1921)
- Fair Harbor (1922)
- Doctor Nye of North Ostable (1923) (adapted into the 1924 film Idle Tongues)
- Rugged Water (1924) (adapted into the 1925 film Rugged Water)
- Queer Judson (1925)
- The Big Mogul (1926)
- The Aristocratic Miss Brewster (1927)
- Silas Bradford's Boy (1928)
- Blair's Attic (1929)
- Blowing Clear (1930)
- All Alongshore (1931)
- Head Tide (1932)
- Back Numbers (1933)
- The Peel Trait (1934)
- Storm Signals (1935)
- Great-Aunt Lavinia (1936)
- Storm Girl (1937)
- Christmas Days (1938)
- A. Hall & Co. (1938)
- The Ownley Inn (1939)
- Rhymes of the Old Cape (1939)
- Out of the Fog (1940)
- The New Hope (1941)
- The Bradshaws of Harniss (1943)
