= Wallace C. Clifton =

American screenwriter

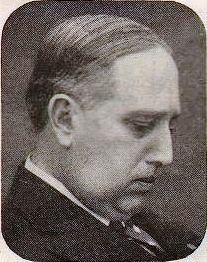

Wallace C. Clifton (1871–1931) was a screenwriter in the United States. His wife Emma Bell Clifton was also a screenwriter.

== Filmography ==
- The Girl and the Gambler (1913)
- In Remembrance (1914), short drama film produced by the Selig Polyscope Company and starring William Stowell; the plot revolved around a couple in New York and the husband's infidelity
- To Be Called For (1914)
- The Foreman of Bar Z Ranch (1915)
- Hearts of the Jungle (1915)
- Heart's Desire
- Just Like a Woman (1915)
- Missing Ruby (1915)
- Aunt Mary
- Heart of the Jungle (1915)
- Primitive Way (1915)
- Between Matinee and Night (1915)
- The Black Butterfly (1916)
- Bridges Burned (1917)
- The Waiting Soul (1917)
- Love in a Hurry (1919)
- The Oakdale Affair (1919), film adaptation
- Three Green Eyes (1919), film adaptation
- Wanted at Headquarters (1920)
- Cheated Hearts, Script, (1921)
- Colorado, Script, (1921)
- False Kisses, Script, (1921)
- The Wise Kid, Screenplay, (1922)
- The Guttersnipe (1922)
- That Woman (1922)
- The Barefoot Boy (1923) (original story)
