= Freckles (novel) =

1904 novel by Gene Stratton-Porter

- Title page for Freckles (1904)
- Author: Gene Stratton-Porter
- Illustrator: E. Stetson Crawford
- Language: English
- Genre: Children's novel; Romance novel
- Publisher: Grosset & Dunlap
- Publication date: 1904
- Publication place: United States
- Media type: Print (hardcover)
- Pages: 352

Freckles is a 1904 novel written by the American writer and naturalist Gene Stratton-Porter. It is primarily set in the Limberlost Swamp area of Indiana, with brief scenes set in Chicago. The title character also appears briefly in Porter's A Girl of the Limberlost. The novel is marked by its frequent, detailed, and loving descriptions of the flora and fauna of the wilderness through the eyes of its innocent protagonist.

== Plot summary ==
The hero is an adult orphan, just under twenty years of age, with bright red hair and a freckled complexion. His right hand is missing at the wrist, and has been since before he can remember. Raised since infancy in a Chicago orphanage, he speaks with a slight Irish accent, "scarcely definite enough to be called a brogue."

Exhausted after days of walking and looking like a hobo, he applies for a job with the Grand Rapids lumber company, guarding timber in the Limberlost Swamp. McLean, part owner, organizer and field manager of the large company, and enthralled with the Limberlost, is impressed by the boy's polite assertiveness and hires him despite his youth and disability. He gives his name only as "Freckles", insisting that he has no name of his own. He claims the name given him in the orphanage (which we never learn) "is no more my name than it is yours". Freckles asks McLean to choose a name for him to put down on the books. McLean gives Freckles the name of his own father, James Ross McLean.

Freckles' duty is to twice a day walk the perimeter of the lumber company's land, a seven-mile trek through lonely swampland, and to be on the watch for those who aim to steal the expensive timber. McLean's chief worry is Black Jack Carter, who has sworn to smuggle several priceless trees out of the swamp. Freckles' weapons are limited to a revolver and a stout stick which he carries at all times and uses to test the wire that marks the company's boundaries. At night Freckles boards with Duncan, head teamster for the lumber company, and Duncan's wife, who becomes a mother figure to Freckles.

Initially terrified of the wilderness after a lifetime in an urban environment, Freckles first conquers his fears, aided by exploration of the Limberlost during its barrenness in the severe winter, and feeds the fickle birds ("my chickens" he calls them) that had once frightened him. With the return of spring and the terror of its inhabitants gone, he develops an interest in the wildlife of the swamp. He is touched by the beauty he sees, and both frustration at his ignorance and curiosity about all he sees lead him, with McLean's help, to purchase several books on natural history. McLean is touched by Freckles' love of nature and urges him to collect specimens, although he warns him against ever killing a bird.

Freckles creates a "room" in the swamp, where he has transplanted the most unusual plant specimens he can find. After a year in the swamp, his hard work and faithfulness lead McLean to bet skeptics a thousand dollars (the value of a single tree among the most valuable) that they can't show him a fresh stump from a tree stolen under Freckles' watch, a wager that threatens to become a self-fulfilling prophecy. Freckles gets an opportunity to prove his capabilities as a guard when Wessner, a recently fired lumberman, comes upon Freckles on his rounds and offers him five hundred dollars to look the other way while Black Jack's gang of thieves steals a prime tree next to the trail. After initially playing dumb to gain information, Freckles puts his gun and stick aside and fights Wessner using only his one fist. He wins, although severely pummeled, and drives Wessner from the swamp. McLean finds him and takes him back to the Duncans over his protests. The boy warns him about the imperiled tree and McLean arranges to have his own crew remove it immediately.

The next afternoon, while he is reading in his room in the swamp, recovering from his beating and taking refuge from the heat of the day, a lovely girl about sixteen years of age appears looking for him. Freckles instantly falls in love with her for her courage as much as her beauty, as she is not afraid of rattlesnakes. The girl's name is never given, but she has come to the swamp with a local photographer known as the Bird Woman and has become lost. Freckles doctors a cut she received on the arm looking for him to lead her out of the swamp, conducts her back to her carriage, and dubs her "the Swamp Angel." He is pleased when the Angel tells him that she and the Bird Woman encountered McLean on the road, who told them about his "son" and how proud he was of him.

That night he returns to the swamp to continue his vigil and encounters McLean, who says he loves Freckles and is going to make him his son. McLean gives Freckles a second revolver for extra protection. In the days that follow, the Bird Woman comes to the swamp often to photograph bird nests while Freckles sings for the Swamp Angel and shows her the wonders of the swamp. One day the Bird Woman spots Wessner and Black Jack in the process of sawing down a tree. Although Freckles' first instinct is to protect the women, the Bird Woman devises a plan to foil the theft, telling Freckles to give the Angel one of his revolvers and producing one of her own. Under the cover of the swamp the three drive off the thieves. Her skill with a gun gives Freckles further reason to love the Swamp Angel. The next day he returns the Angel's hat that she left behind during the fracas to her father at work, rather than going to her home, and this gentlemanly behavior makes a positive impression. While Freckles secretly worships the Swamp Angel, he believes himself to be far below her in social class and meaning nothing to her.

Freckles is given the use of a bicycle to alert the camp swiftly should the thieves appear again. In spite of these precautions, Black Jack ambushes Freckles at dawn, spilling him from his bicycle, and captures him. His gang, all deserters from McLean's crew, tie him to a tree in the room and begin to cut down a valuable tree in its wall. After they finish, Freckles is to be left for Wessner to kill personally, and his body will be hidden so that it will look like he joined the thieves, killing his reputation as well. However, the Swamp Angel finds them, pretends to think they are on official camp business, flirts with Black Jack to make him trust her, and rides off on Freckles' bicycle. She sends Mrs. Duncan to warn the Bird Woman on the other side of the swamp and rides off to bring help. Despite crashing the bicycle she reaches the camp and urges the crew to hurry. When the reinforcements return, led by the Angel, they find that the Bird Woman has shot Black Jack in the arm and captured both him and Wessner. Freckles is found bound and gagged, and bleeding from a blow to the head, but has not lost his courage. The Angel frees him from his bonds and hugs him, during which Black Jack makes a break for freedom and runs into the swamp. The fallen logs are recovered but Black Jack has sworn revenge on Freckles and the Swamp Angel, and a thorough search of the Limberlost fails to find him.

For a week, Freckles pushes himself to the point of exhaustion by guarding the trees during the day and the home of the Swamp Angel at night. Finally, it is discovered the Black Jack was killed by the creatures of the swamp, and Freckles is able to relax his watch. He and the Swamp Angel find several trees that Black Jack had marked, but when the last one is felled it nearly crushes the Swamp Angel. Freckles rushes toward her and pushes her out of danger, but the blow from the tree falls on him instead, and smashes almost all the bones in his chest. The Swamp Angel and her father rush him to the finest hospital in Chicago, but Freckles' belief that the Swamp Angel deserves a better husband causes him almost to lose the will to live. He fears that he is descended from criminals, who abused their baby and cut off his hand intentionally.

The Swamp Angel declares her love for Freckles, assures him that—since "thistles grow from thistles, and lilies from other lilies"—he must be descended from upright and good-hearted people, "a lily, straight through", who "never, never could have drifted from the thistle-patch". She promises that she will find his parents and prove that Freckles comes from "a race of men that have been gentlemen for ages, and couldn't be anything else." Her inquiries at his former orphanage lead her to Lord and Lady O'More, Irish nobility who have been searching Chicago for Lord O'More's lost nephew. They prove themselves to be kind and noble, and explain that Freckles' father had been disinherited when he married a clergyman's daughter, and both had perished in the fire that took his hand. Freckles' true name is Terence Maxwell O'More of Dunderry House in County Clare. The virtue of his parents proven, Freckles revives and becomes engaged to marry the Swamp Angel. With the help of McLean, whom he still regards as a foster father, Freckles plans out what the next few years will hold. Rather than go to Ireland and live as a lord, he will go to college in the United States and then join McLean in managing the lumber company, so that he can always be near the Limberlost.

== Adaptations ==
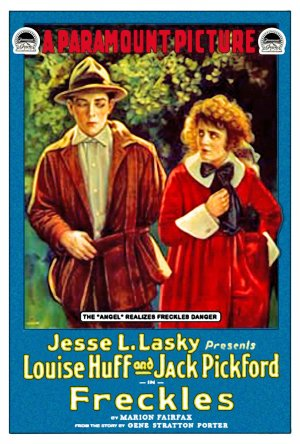
Poster for Freckles (1917) starring Jack Pickford

Film adaptations include the following:

- Freckles (1917), starring Jack Pickford
- Freckles (1928), starring Johnny Fox
- Freckles (1935), starring Tom Brown
- Freckles (1960), starring Martin West
- City Boy (1992), starring Christian Campbell

The novel was also adapted into a Japanese manga series titled Sobakasu no Shōnen (そばかすの少年; "The Freckled Boy"), serialized in Bessatsu Shōjo Comic magazine from 1979 to 1980. The manga was based on the Japanese translation of Freckles by Hanako Muraoka and illustrated by Keiko Takemiya. Its chapters were later collected into a single paperback volume published by Shogakukan.
