= Gene Stratton-Porter Cabin (Rome City, Indiana) =

Historic house in Indiana, United States

- Gene Stratton Porter Cabin
- U.S. National Register of Historic Places
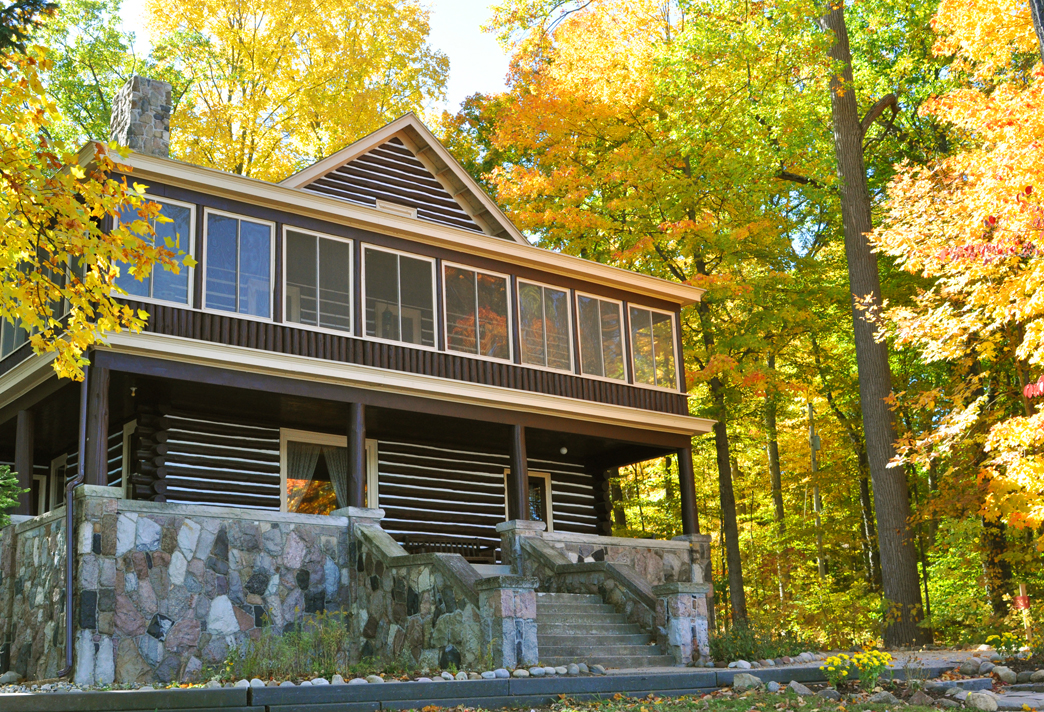
- Gene's Cabin at Wildflower Woods

- Location within Indiana Location within the United States
- Location: Southeast of Rome City off State Road 9, near corner of County Road 850 North and Pleasant Point
- Nearest city: Rome City, Indiana
- Coordinates: 41°28′51″N 85°20′55″W
- Area: 10 acres (4.0 ha)
- Built: 1913
- Architect: Gene Stratton-Porter
- Architectural style: Rustic
- NRHP reference No.: 74000015
- Added to NRHP: June 27, 1974

The Gene Stratton-Porter Cabin, known as the Cabin at Wildflower Woods and the Gene Stratton-Porter State Historic Site, is the former home of Gene Stratton-Porter, a noted Indiana author, naturalist, and nature photographer. The two-story, fourteen-room cabin, which was built in 1914, is located at Sylvan Lake near Rome City in Noble County, Indiana. Stratton-Porter lived full-time in the cabin from 1914 through 1919, then relocated to homes in California, where she continued to write and founded a movie studio. She returned to Wildflower Woods in Rome City for brief visits until her death in 1924. The property was listed on the National Register of Historic Places in 1974.

Stratton-Porter began her literary career in 1900 and wrote several books while living at the historic cabin. These included novels, Michael O'Halloran (1915) and A Daughter of the Land (1918); a book of nature studies, Homing with the Birds (1919); and Morning Face (1916), a children's book. Her Father's Daughter (1921) was published shortly after Stratton-Porter moved to California. Scenes for a moving picture adaptation of Stratton-Porter's book, The Harvester (1911), were filmed on location at Wildflower Woods in 1927.

== History ==
In 1912, after the Limberlost Swamp was drained and developed for commercial purposes, Gene Stratton-Porter, a noted Indiana author, naturalist, and nature photographer, made the decision to move from her Limberlost Cabin in Geneva, Indiana, to a new location for inspiration for her writing projects. She initially purchased a small home on the north side of Sylvan Lake near Rome City in Noble County, Indiana, about 85 miles (137 km) from her cabin in Geneva. It served as a temporary residence while she looked for property to build a year-round home at the lake. Stratton-Porter hoped that a lakeside home would provide more privacy and a new venue for her to observe wildlife. She had first visited Sylvan Lake in the mid-1880s to attend the Island Park Assembly. It was also where she first met Charles D. Porter, whom she married in 1886. With the wealth she had attained from her successful writing career, Stratton-Porter used profits from her books to purchase wooded property overlooking the lake. Her estate home eventually encompassed about 120 acres (49 hectares) of land.

In 1913 Stratton-Porter helped design and build a fourteen-room lakeside home. She named the new two-story, cedar-log cabin "Wildflower Woods," although she also referred to it as the "Limberlost Cabin" because of its similarity to her previous home. In addition to assisting with cabin's construction, Stratton-Porter also wrote Laddie (1913).

Stratton-Porter moved into the cabin at Wildflower Woods in February 1914 and lived there on a full-time basis until 1919. Her husband, Charles, who remained at their home in Geneva, commuted to Sylvan Lake on weekends. Stratton-Porter's daily routine at Wildflower Woods included working on writing projects in the morning. She also worked with Frank Wallace, a tree surgeon who later became Indiana's state entomologist, to develop the grounds of her estate into a private wildlife sanctuary. Stratton-Porter was involved in planting about 90 percent of the more than 14,000 trees, wildflowers, vines, and shrubs on her property, including vegetable and flower gardens and an orchard behind the house. The natural setting along the lake provided her with the privacy she desired, at least initially; however, her continued success as an author brought unwanted visitors and trespassers to her woodland retreat.

Stratton-Porter had intended to spend the remainder of her life at Wildflower Woods, but it eventually attracted too many uninvited visitors. She moved to California in 1919, and never returned to live at Wildflower Woods on a full-time basis. Stratton-Porter retained ownership of the Indiana property and returned for periodic visits until her death in California in 1924.

Several of Stratton-Porter's books were published during her six-year residency at Wildflower Woods. Between 1914 and 1920 she published two novels, Michael O'Halloran and A Daughter of the Land (1918); a book of nature studies, Homing with the Birds (1919); and Morning Face (1916), a children's book. Her Father's Daughter (1921) was published shortly after her move to California. In 1927 scenes for a film adaptation of Stratton-Porter's book, The Harvester (1911), were filmed on location at Wildflower Woods. In 1940 the Gene Stratton-Porter Association purchased Wildflower Woods from Stratton-Porter's daughter, Jeannette Porter Meehan, the sole heir of her estate. In 1946 the association donated 13 acres (5.3 hectares) of property to the State of Indiana, including the cabin, its formal gardens, orchard, and a pond. The present-day Gene Stratton-Porter State Historic Site of nearly 150 acres (61 hectares) includes 20 acres (8.1 hectares) that were part of her original estate.

The Indiana State Museum and Historic Sites maintains and operates the Sylvan Lake property, which includes a visitor center, Stratton-Porter's cabin, and grounds. It is open to the public from April through December. The grounds are open daily from dawn until dusk; guided tours of the first floor of the fourteen-room home are available for a small admission charge. The site also hosts special events throughout the year. It was listed on the National Register of Historic Places in 1974.

In May 1999 Stratton-Porter's descendants returned her remains and those of her only daughter, Jeannette Porter Meehan, to Wildflower Woods for burial. The graves of Stratton-Porter and Meehan are in the woods near the cabin. It was the author's wish to have a tree planted to mark her gravesite; she is buried near her favorite tree

== Description ==
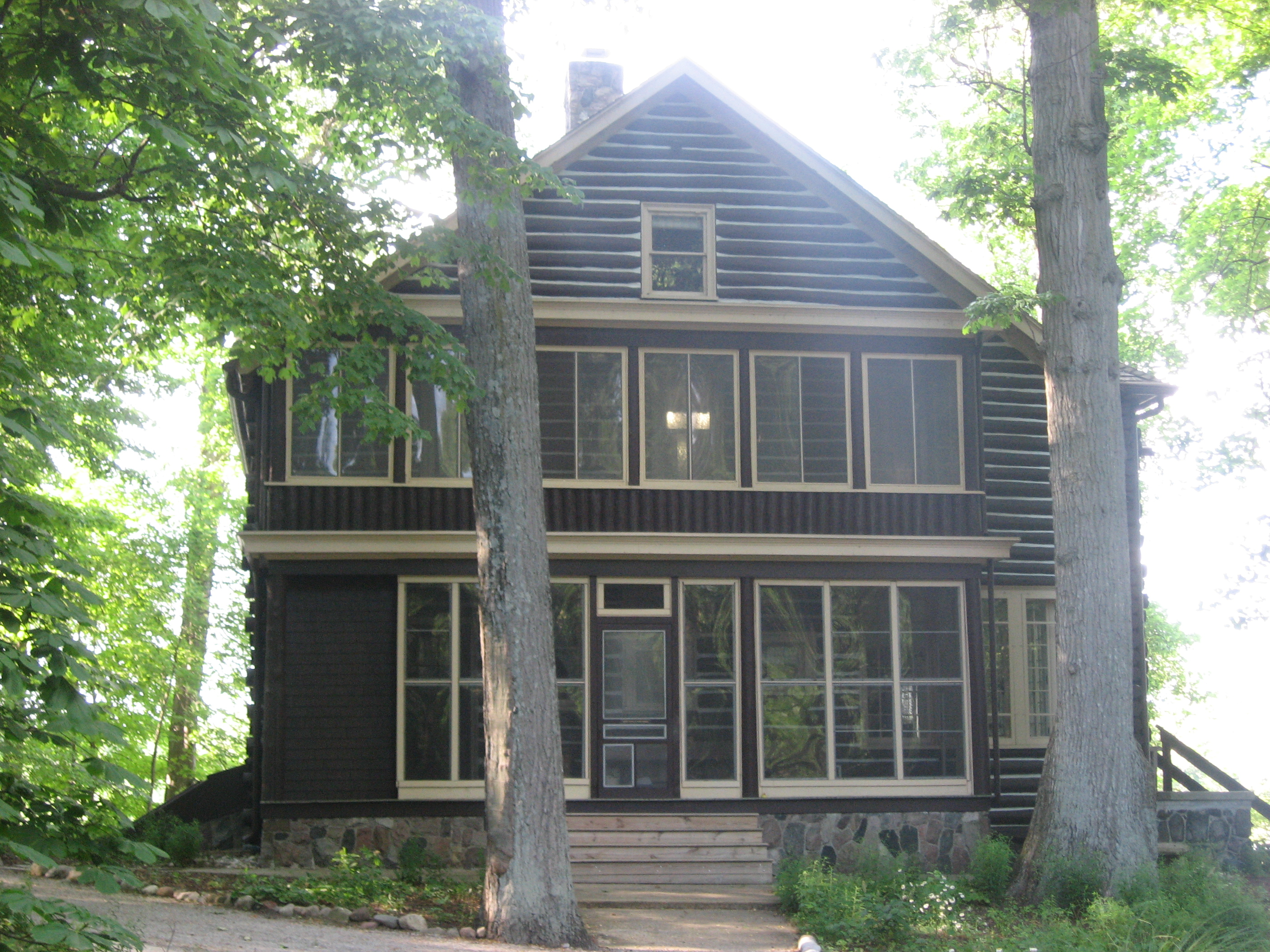
Front of the Cabin in Wildflower Woods

The design of the Sylvan Lake cabin was inspired by the Forestry Building at the World's Columbian Exposition in Chicago, which the Porters visited in 1893, The Sylvan Lake cabin closely resembles Stratton-Porter's Limberlost Cabin at Geneva. The exterior of the fourteen-room, two-story cabin was built with Wisconsin white cedar-logs on a stone foundation. The home also includes an L-shaped, two-story porch overlooking the lake. Another two-story porch was constructed across the home's rear facade. The second-story porches were screened to provide open-air sleeping rooms when the weather was warm enough. The property eventually included about 150 acres (61 hectares) of land and featured a formal flower garden, orchards, and a small pond.

The cabin's interior provided living spaces and workspaces for Stratton-Porter's literary projects. The first floor includes an entrance hall, a living room, dining room, library, kitchen, conservatory, and a photographic darkroom. The entrance hall and dining room were covered in wild cherry-wood panels. The living room's stone fireplace, one of three on the first floor, contains a number of carved stone Aztec Indian heads which were brought from Mexico by Mr. Porter. The second floor has seven bedrooms, one and a half baths, and sleeping rooms above the porch. The home was initially lit with gaslights. Electric lights were installed after Stratton-Porter's move to California in 1919.

The present-day cabin, which the Indiana State Museum and Historic Sites operates as a historic house museum, includes Stratton-Porter memorabilia, many pictures that she colored by hand, her reference books, and pottery that she collected over the years. Built-in cabinetry houses her various collections. In addition to the cabin, visitors may explore the site's formal garden, as well as wooded paths and a nearby wetlands and prairie site that are undergoing restoration. Stratton-Porter used the inspiration that she received from the woods around the premises for her nature studies, writing, and photographs. Some of her furniture and other belongings are on display in the cabin, reflecting how she preferred to live her life.
