= Michael O'Halloran (1948 film) =

1948 film by John Rawlins

- Directed by: John Rawlins
- Written by: Erna Lazarus
- Based on: Michael O'Halloran by Gene Stratton-Porter
- Produced by: Julian Lesser; Frank Melford
- Starring: Scotty Beckett; Allene Roberts; Tommy Cook
- Cinematography: Jack MacKenzie
- Edited by: John Sheets
- Music by: Lucien Moraweck; Marlin Skiles
- Production company: Windsor Pictures Corporation
- Distributed by: Monogram Pictures
- Release date: August 8, 1948
- Running time: 79 minutes
- Country: United States
- Language: English

Michael O'Halloran is a 1948 American drama film directed by John Rawlins and starring Scotty Beckett, Allene Roberts and Tommy Cook. It is an adaptation of the novel of the same name by Gene Stratton-Porter. It was distributed by Monogram Pictures. The film's art direction was by Lucius O. Croxton.

== Cast ==
- Scotty Beckett as Michael O'Halloran
- Allene Roberts as Lily Nelson
- Tommy Cook as Joey
- Isabel Jewell as Mrs. Laura Nelson
- Charles Arnt as Doc Douglas Bruce
- Jonathan Hale as Judge Schaffner
- Gladys Blake as Saleslady
- Roy Gordon as Dr. Carrell
- Florence Auer as Mrs. Jane Crawford
- William Haade as Detective Benson
- Dorothy Granger as Ward Nurse
- Douglas Evans as Dr. Johnson
- Beverly Jons as Student Nurse
- Gregg Barton as Officer Barker
- Lee Phelps as Officer Lounergan
- Harry Strang as Officer Lee Martin
- Mark Roberts as Pete
- Ethyl May Halls as Woman
- Ralph Brooks as Interne
- Robert Haines as Stenotype Operator

== Bibliography ==
- John Flowers & Paul Frizler. Psychotherapists on Film, 1899-1999: M-Z. McFarland, 2004.
