= Rome City, Indiana =

- Town
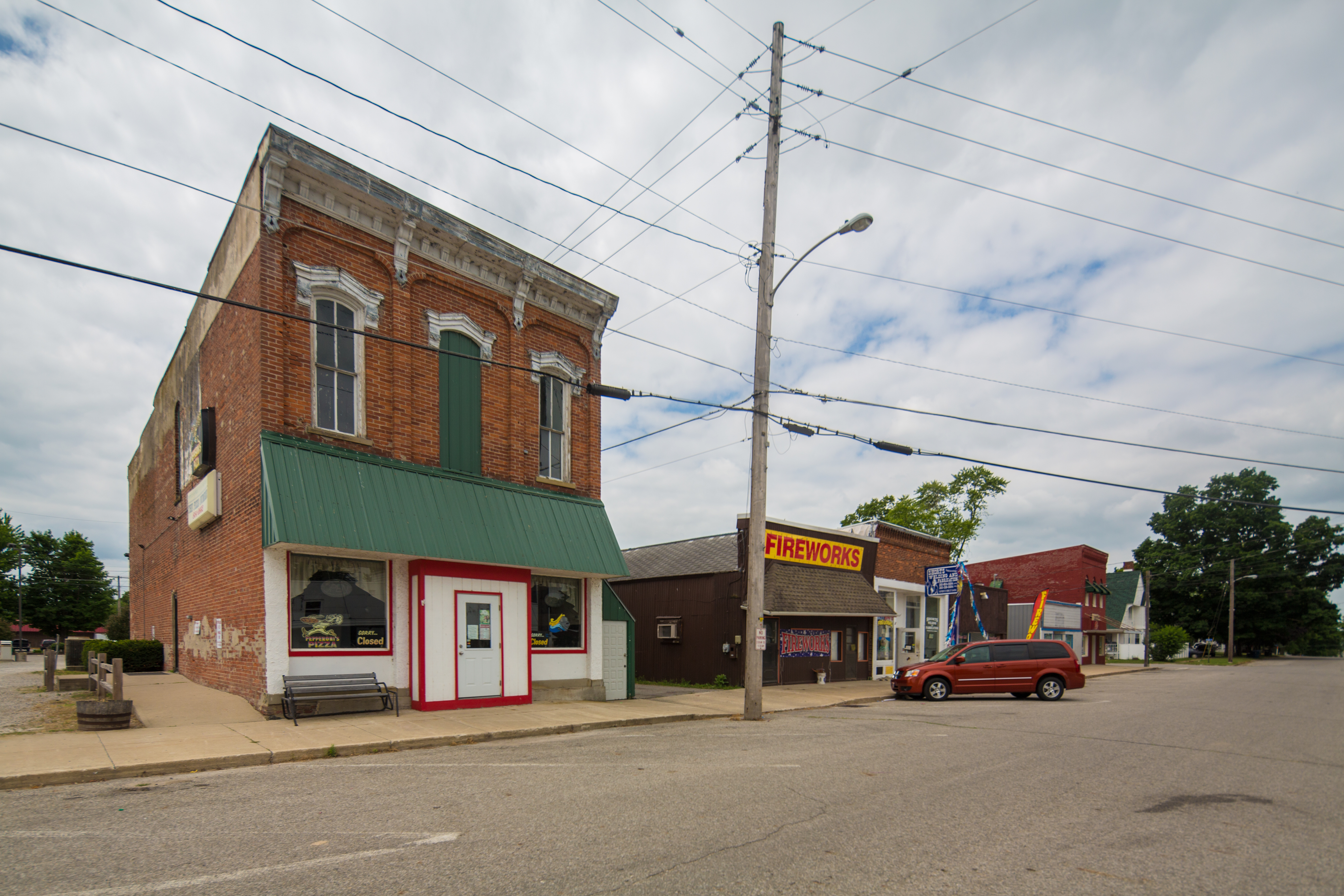

- Location of Rome City in Noble County, Indiana.
- Coordinates: 41°29′33″N 85°22′19″W
- Country: United States
- State: Indiana
- County: Noble
- Township: Orange

Area
  - Total: 2.47 sq mi (6.40 km^{2})
  - Land: 1.47 sq mi (3.81 km^{2})
  - Water: 1.00 sq mi (2.59 km^{2})
- Elevation: 922 ft (281 m)

Population (2020)
  - Total: 1,322
  - Density: 898/sq mi (346.9/km^{2})
- Time zone: UTC-5 (Eastern (EST))
  - Summer (DST): UTC-4 (EDT)
- ZIP code: 46784
- Area code: 260
- FIPS code: 18-65808
- GNIS feature ID: 2396888
- Website: www.in.gov/towns/townofromecity/

Rome City is a town in Orange Township, Noble County, in the U.S. state of Indiana. As of the 2020 census, Rome City had a population of 1,322.

== History ==
Rome City was laid out in 1839. A post office has been in operation at the town since 1868.

== Geography ==
Rome City is located along Indiana State Road 9 adjacent to Sylvan Lake.

According to the 2010 census, Rome City has a total area of 2.151 square miles (5.57 km^{2}), of which 1.16 square miles (3.00 km^{2}) (or 53.93%) is land and 0.991 square miles (2.57 km^{2}) (or 46.07%) is water.

== Demographics ==
Historical population
| Census | Pop. | Note | %± |
|---|---|---|---|
| 1870 | 351 | | — |
| 1880 | 440 | | 25.4% |
| 1970 | 1,354 | | — |
| 1980 | 1,319 | | −2.6% |
| 1990 | 1,138 | | −13.7% |
| 2000 | 1,615 | | 41.9% |
| 2010 | 1,361 | | −15.7% |
| 2020 | 1,322 | | −2.9% |
U.S. Decennial Census

=== 2020 census ===
As of the 2020 census, Rome City had a population of 1,322. The median age was 51.2 years. 18.1% of residents were under the age of 18 and 25.0% of residents were 65 years of age or older. For every 100 females there were 98.2 males, and for every 100 females age 18 and over there were 93.4 males age 18 and over.

0.0% of residents lived in urban areas, while 100.0% lived in rural areas.

There were 569 households in Rome City, of which 21.4% had children under the age of 18 living in them. Of all households, 55.2% were married-couple households, 15.6% were households with a male householder and no spouse or partner present, and 23.2% were households with a female householder and no spouse or partner present. About 28.1% of all households were made up of individuals and 13.7% had someone living alone who was 65 years of age or older.

There were 819 housing units, of which 30.5% were vacant. The homeowner vacancy rate was 3.1% and the rental vacancy rate was 9.8%.

Racial composition as of the 2020 census
| Race | Number | Percent |
|---|---|---|
| White | 1,274 | 96.4% |
| Black or African American | 2 | 0.2% |
| American Indian and Alaska Native | 4 | 0.3% |
| Asian | 8 | 0.6% |
| Native Hawaiian and Other Pacific Islander | 2 | 0.2% |
| Some other race | 6 | 0.5% |
| Two or more races | 26 | 2.0% |
| Hispanic or Latino (of any race) | 24 | 1.8% |

=== 2010 census ===
As of the census of 2010, there were 1,361 people, 563 households, and 393 families living in the town. The population density was 1,173.3 inhabitants per square mile (453.0/km^{2}). There were 842 housing units at an average density of 725.9 per square mile (280.3/km^{2}). The racial makeup of the town was 98.8% White, 0.4% African American, 0.2% Native American, 0.1% Asian, 0.1% from other races, and 0.2% from two or more races. Hispanic or Latino of any race were 1.1% of the population.

There were 563 households, of which 29.1% had children under the age of 18 living with them, 53.8% were married couples living together, 11.2% had a female householder with no husband present, 4.8% had a male householder with no wife present, and 30.2% were non-families. 25.9% of all households were made up of individuals, and 10.5% had someone living alone who was 65 years of age or older. The average household size was 2.42 and the average family size was 2.87.

The median age in the town was 44.4 years. 22.6% of residents were under the age of 18; 7% were between the ages of 18 and 24; 21.4% were from 25 to 44; 32.1% were from 45 to 64; and 16.8% were 65 years of age or older. The gender makeup of the town was 49.6% male and 50.4% female.

=== 2000 census ===
As of the census of 2000, there were 1,615 people, 629 households, and 489 families living in the town. The population density was 1,354.0 inhabitants per square mile (522.8/km^{2}). There were 825 housing units at an average density of 691.7 per square mile (267.1/km^{2}). The racial makeup of the town was 98.33% White, 0.19% African American, 0.19% Native American, 0.06% Asian, 0.31% Pacific Islander, 0.06% from other races, and 0.87% from two or more races. Hispanic or Latino of any race were 0.56% of the population.

There were 629 households, out of which 33.7% had children under the age of 18 living with them, 62.6% were married couples living together, 11.0% had a female householder with no husband present, and 22.1% were non-families. 19.2% of all households were made up of individuals, and 7.6% had someone living alone who was 65 years of age or older. The average household size was 2.57 and the average family size was 2.90.

In the town, the population was spread out, with 25.1% under the age of 18, 7.0% from 18 to 24, 29.1% from 25 to 44, 26.8% from 45 to 64, and 12.0% who were 65 years of age or older. The median age was 38 years. For every 100 females, there were 101.6 males. For every 100 females age 18 and over, there were 102.3 males.

The median income for a household in the town was $41,118, and the median income for a family was $46,591. Males had a median income of $33,239 versus $21,630 for females. The per capita income for the town was $19,612. About 7.7% of families and 9.3% of the population were below the poverty line, including 13.8% of those under age 18 and 8.5% of those age 65 or over.

== Education ==
Rome City residents may obtain a free library card from the Kendallville Public Library in Kendallville.

== Notable people ==
- Ford Frick, commissioner of Major League Baseball from 1951 to 1965, went to high school in Rome City.
- Gene Stratton Porter (August 17, 1863 – December 6, 1924), author, nature photographer, naturalist, and silent movie-era producer, lived at her lakeside estate, the Cabin at Wildflower Woods, near Rome City from 1913 until 1919. Scenes from the 1927 movie based on her novel, The Harvester, were filmed at Wildflower Woods. The property has been designated as the Gene Stratton-Porter State Historic Site, operated by the Indiana State Museum and Historic Sites, and open to the public.

== See also ==
- Rome, Indiana
- The Way College of Biblical Research – Indiana Campus
