= Michael O'Halloran (1923 film) =

1923 American silent drama film

- Directed by: James Leo Meehan
- Written by: James Leo Meehan
- Based on: Michael O'Halloran by Gene Stratton-Porter
- Starring: True Eames Boardman; Ethel Irving; Irene Rich
- Cinematography: Floyd Jackman
- Production company: Gene Stratton Porter Productions
- Distributed by: W. W. Hodkinson Corporation
- Release date: June 10, 1923
- Country: United States
- Languages: Silent; English intertitles

Michael O'Halloran is a 1923 American silent drama film directed by James Leo Meehan and starring True Eames Boardman, Ethel Irving and Irene Rich. It is an adaptation of the novel of the same name by Gene Stratton-Porter.

== Cast ==
- True Eames Boardman as Michael O'Halloran
- Ethel Irving as Peaches
- Irene Rich as Nellie Minturn
- Charles Clary as James Minturn
- Claire McDowell as Nancy Harding
- Charles Hill Mailes as Peter Harding
- Josie Sedgwick as Leslie Winton
- William Boyd as Douglas Bruce

== Bibliography ==
- Taves, Brian. Thomas Ince: Hollywood's Independent Pioneer. University Press of Kentucky, 2012.
