= Michael O'Halloran (1937 film) =

1937 film by Karl Brown

- Directed by: Karl Brown
- Written by: Adele Buffington
- Based on: Michael O'Halloran by Gene Stratton-Porter
- Produced by: Herman Schlom
- Starring: Wynne Gibson; Warren Hull; Jackie Moran
- Cinematography: Jack A. Marta
- Edited by: Edward Mann
- Music by: Alberto Colombo
- Production company: Republic Pictures
- Distributed by: Republic Pictures
- Release date: May 15, 1937
- Running time: 68 minutes
- Country: United States
- Language: English

Michael O'Halloran is a 1937 American drama film directed by Karl Brown and starring Wynne Gibson, Warren Hull and Jackie Moran. It is an adaptation of the 1915 novel of the same name by Gene Stratton-Porter.

== Cast ==
- Wynne Gibson as Grace Mintum
- Warren Hull as Dr. Douglas Bruce
- Jackie Moran as Michael O'Halloran
- Charlene Wyatt as Lily O'Halloran
- Sidney Blackmer as Jim Mintum
- Irene Manning as Leslie
- G. P. Huntley as Ted Frost
- Robert Greig as Craig, the Butler
- Helen Lowell as Hettie
- Vera Gordon as Mrs. Levinsky
- Pierre Watkin as Mark Grave
- Dorothy Vaughan as Mrs. Tolliver
- Bodil Rosing as Mrs. Polska
- Guy Usher as Judge H.J. Benson
- Edgar Allen as Reporter
- Richard Beach as Eddie
- Anne Bennett as Mary Jones
- Doris Bren as Nina Polska
- Lynn Browning as Friend
- Sonny Bupp as Sarge
- Horace B. Carpenter as Skipper
- Nell Craig as Reporter
- Walter Dennis as Snowball
- Barry Downing as Malcolm Minturn
- Winifred Drew as Friend
- Jay Eaton as Friend
- Bill Elliott as Little Lord Fauntleroy
- Fern Emmett as Ella
- Donald Kerr as Reporter
- Leonard Kibrick as Benny Levinsky
- Jack Leppert as Butch
- Vince Lombardi as Tony Dominic
- Roger McGee as Fat Tolliver
- Shirley McGee as Sally Tolliver
- Harold Miller as Friend
- Nellie V. Nichols as Mrs. Dominic
- Paddy O'Flynn as Elevator Starter
- Alexander Pollard as Footman
- Ben Taggart as Officer Reardon
- Carol Tevis as Mary Jane
- Audrey Halligan
- June Parkes
- Ronald Hughson
- Carleton Young

== Bibliography ==
- Elizabeth Leese. Costume Design in the Movies: An Illustrated Guide to the Work of 157 Great Designers. Courier Corporation, 2012.
