= The Harvester =

1936 film by Joseph Santley

- Directed by: Joseph Santley
- Screenplay by: Homer Croy; Robert Lee Johnson; Elizabeth Meehan; Gertrude Orr
- Based on: The Harvester by Gene Stratton-Porter
- Produced by: Nat Levine
- Starring: Alice Brady; Russell Hardie; Ann Rutherford; Frank Craven; Cora Sue Collins; Emma Dunn
- Cinematography: Reggie Lanning; Edward Snyder
- Edited by: Murray Seldeen
- Production company: Republic Pictures
- Distributed by: Republic Pictures
- Release date: April 18, 1936
- Running time: 65 minutes
- Country: United States
- Language: English

The Harvester is a 1936 American comedy film directed by Joseph Santley and written by Homer Croy, Robert Lee Johnson, Elizabeth Meehan and Gertrude Orr. It is based on the 1911 novel The Harvester by Gene Stratton-Porter, which had previously been turned into a 1927 silent film of the same title. The film stars Alice Brady, Russell Hardie, Ann Rutherford, Frank Craven, Cora Sue Collins and Emma Dunn. The film was released on April 18, 1936, by Republic Pictures.

== Plot ==
In rural 1890s Indiana, farmer David Langston, a single man who has focused his time on his work, is pressured to wed the daughter of the wealthy Mrs. Biddle, Thelma. While David's orphaned friend, Ruth Jameson, is in love with him, David ends up accepting Mrs. Biddle's demands and agrees to wed Thelma. After technological advancements make their way to the town, Mrs. Biddle attempts to pressure David to leave his job as a farmer and join her husband, Mr. Biddle, in a career of real estate. However, Mr. Biddle, who is discontented with his current life, cautions David against selling his farm. Meanwhile, Mrs. Biddle, in an effort to secure David's marriage to her daughter, has Ruth's younger sister, Naomi, whom he adores, put into an orphanage.

Soon after, Ruth's grandmother, who opposed David's marriage to Thelma, dies, David and Ruth are drawn closer together, making David question his decision, and soon figures out Mrs. Biddle put Naomi in the orphanage. David then publicly confronts Mrs. Biddle, and boldly announces his intentions to adopt Naomi himself. Thelma, infuriated, breaks their engagement, and Ruth, David, and Naomi are reunited, with David deciding to remain a harvester.

== Cast ==
- Alice Brady as Mrs. Biddle
- Russell Hardie as David Langston
- Ann Rutherford as Ruth Jameson
- Frank Craven as Mr. Biddle
- Cora Sue Collins as Naomi Jameson
- Emma Dunn as Granny Moreland
- Joyce Compton as Thelma Biddle
- Edward Nugent as Bert Munroe
- Roy Atwell as Jake Eben
- Spencer Charters as Stubby Pratt
- Russell Simpson as Abner Prewett
- Phyllis Fraser as Gladys
- Fern Emmett as Miss Sophronia
- Burr Caruth as Dr. Carey
- Lucille Ward as Mrs. Griggs
- Harry Bowen as Carl
- Grace Hayle as Mrs. Kramer

== Criticisms ==
This adaptation of the original 1911 novel by Gene Stratton-Porter features many plot differences, which some claim detract from the overall quality of the film. This is especially true considering how well received the novel was at publication. According to a review published by The New York Times, there "has been lost the simple nobility of its central figure that made the book a best seller when it was written." The author of this review, referenced as J.T.M., claims the movie could not be seen as parallel to the vision Stratton-Porter had when writing the novel. The portrayal of the titular figure, David Langston, is seen as "a most naïve young man, far too easily urged away from his herb patches and the rural destiny that so patently befits him by an extremely transparent plot of feminine scheming."
