= Limberlost Swamp =

Historic wetland in Indiana, United States

Coordinates: 40°36′00″N 84°56′50″W

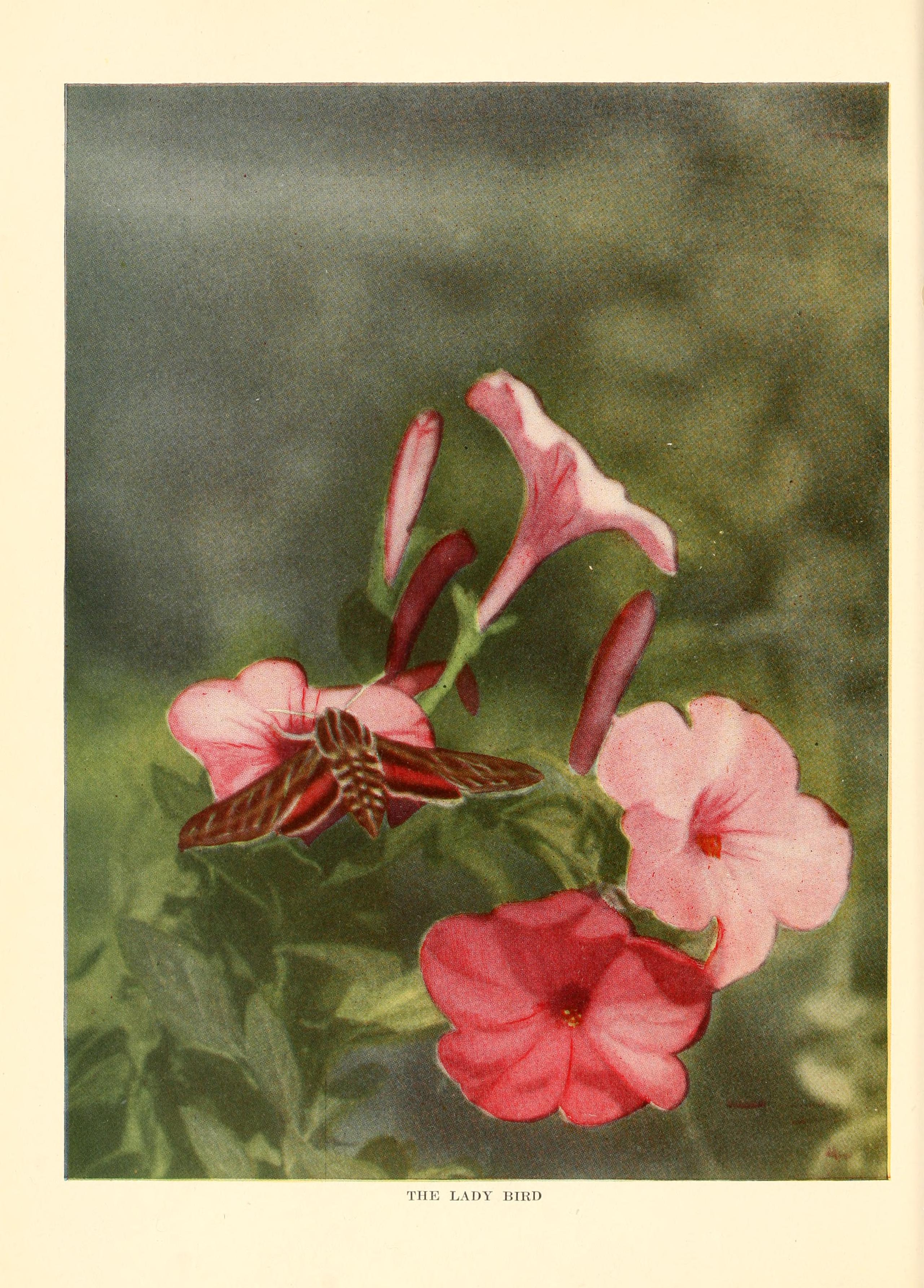
Deilephila lineata – illustration from the book Moths of the Limberlost

The Limberlost Swamp in the eastern part of the present-day U.S. state of Indiana was a large, nationally known wetlands region with streams that flowed into the Wabash River. It originally covered 13,000 acres (53 km^{2}) of present-day Adams and Jay counties. Parts of it were known as the Loblolly Marsh, based on a word by local Miami Native Americans for the sulphur smell of the marsh gas. The wetlands had mixed vegetation and supported a rich biodiversity, significant for local and migrating birds and insects, as well as other animals and life.

European Americans drained the Limberlost for agricultural development early in the 20th century, destroying the rich habitat. Since 1997, parts of it have been restored. Observers have documented a return of insects, birds, and wildlife of all sorts to the restored area of wetlands. Approximately 1,500 acres (6.1 km^{2}) had been restored as of 2015. Several groups supported purchase of lands for what is now known as the Loblolly Marsh Nature Preserve, which was turned over to the state and is held by the Indiana Department of Natural Resources.

== Origin of name ==
According to the History of Jay County by Marcus Whitman Montgomery, published in 1864, the name Limberlost came from the following event:

A man named James Miller, while hunting along the banks of the swamp, became lost. After various fruitless efforts to find his way home, in which he would always come around to the place of starting, he determined to go in a straight course, and so, every few rods he would blaze a tree. While doing this, he was found by friends. Being an agile man, he was known as 'limber Jim,' and, after this, the stream was called 'Limberlost.'

The Indiana State Museum contends, "The swamp received its name from the fate of 'Limber Jim' Corbus, who went hunting in the swamp and never returned. When the locals asked where Jim Corbus was, the familiar cry was 'Limber's lost!'"

== Draining, development, and restoration ==
After being drained from 1888 to 1910 by a steam-powered dredge, the area was cultivated as farmland for 80 years. In 1991, local citizen Ken Brunswick established "Limberlost Swamp Remembered", a group organized to restore some of the wetlands, because of their importance as habitat. The work has included removing or blocking drainage tiles, allowing water back on the land, and planting native species of trees, bushes and flowers. As of 2015, The Loblolly Marsh had been entered into Indiana's Wetland Reserve Program by five owners; it was purchased with funds from The Indiana Heritage Trust, ACRES Land Trust, Ropchan Foundation, M. E. Raker Foundation, and Friends of the Limberlost/Limberlost Swamp Remembered Committee.

An alternative name for the area was Loblolly Marsh. This name has been said to have been derived from a Miami language word for "stinking river", related to the sulfur smell of marsh gas). However, the Oxford English Dictionary says that "loblolly" means a thick gruel or porridge, and that it occurs in the US as a colloquialism for a mud-hole. One quotation given by the OED, from The Log of a Cowboy by the Western writer Andy Adams, is "His ineffectual struggles caused him to sink farther to the flanks in the loblolly which the tramping of the cattle had caused."

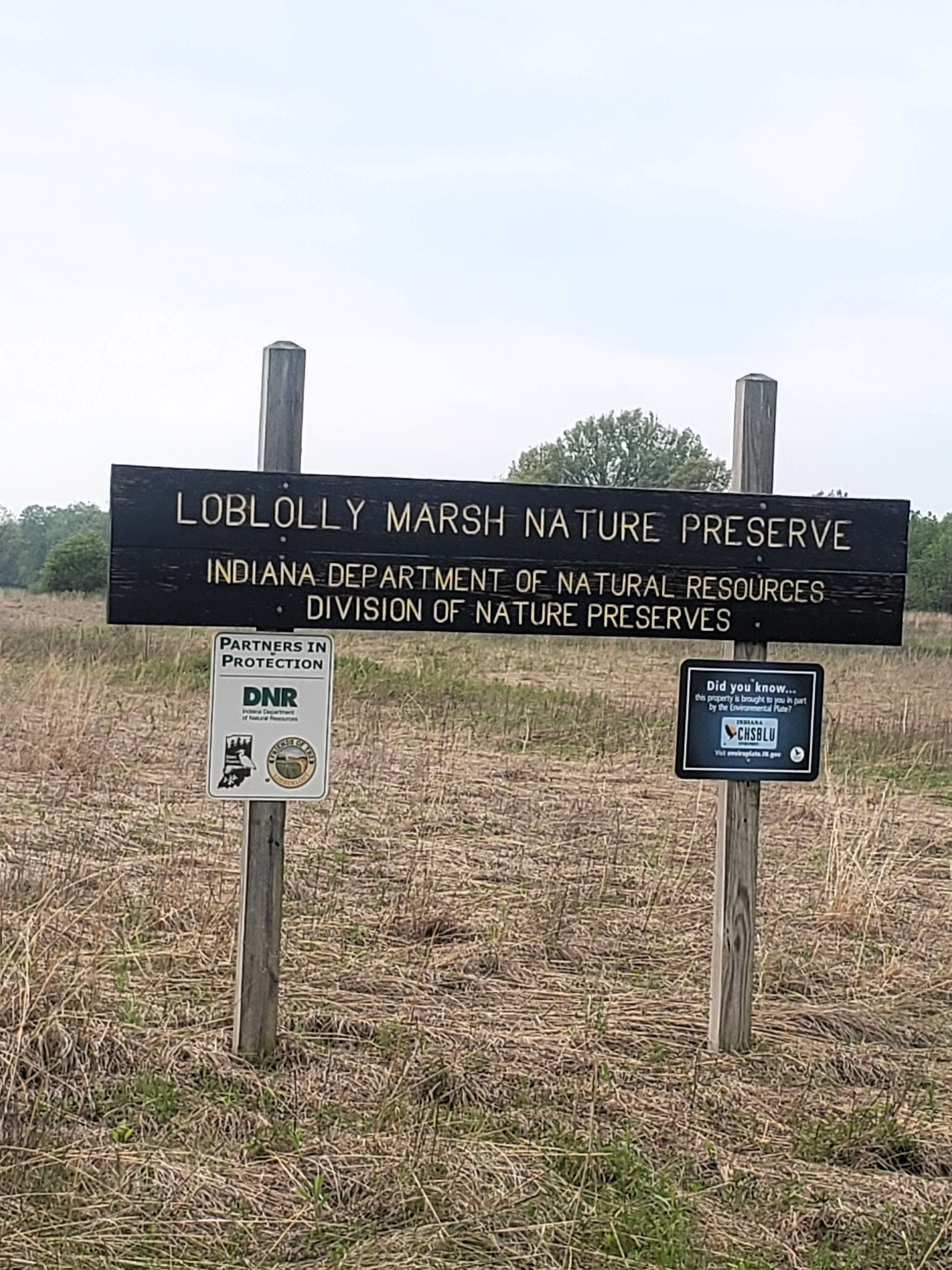
Loblolly Marsh Nature Preserve

The restored marsh has already attracted numerous species of insects, birds, and animals as the first major section has been restored. The 428-acre restoration project was dedicated as the Loblolly Marsh Wetland Preserve in 1997. Activists have included students from Ball State University, who participated in restoration activities, such as planting native habitat. Approximately 1,500 acres (6.1 km^{2}) have been purchased and restored.

As of 2015, the Loblolly Marsh Nature Preserve is held by the Indiana Department of Natural Resources. It has a parking area and walking trails, including Veronica's Trail—0.25 mile wheelchair-accessible wooden boardwalk built to comply with the Americans with Disabilities Act. The preserve's floodplains connect to the Wabash River and support river bulrush, sedges, prairie cord grass, burr reed and cattails. The upland area contains a 25-acre mature woodland of hardwood trees.

== Representation in media ==
- Indiana-born author Gene Stratton-Porter helped make the Limberlost Swamp famous in the early 20th century. She lived for years on its periphery and lobbied unsuccessfully against its ongoing destruction. The swamp served as the setting for two of her novels, Freckles (1904) and A Girl of the Limberlost (1909). Her novel The Harvester (1911) includes the names of many of the plants found in the swamp around the time the book was written. Stratton-Porter was also an accomplished artist and wildlife photographer who specialized in making close-up photographs of the birds and moths in their natural habitat. Several of her nonfiction nature books, including Moths of the Limberlost (1912), feature the swamp's wildlife. Her residences in the area became the laboratories for her research. They are preserved today as the Limberlost Cabin, the Limberlost State Historic Site in Geneva, and the Cabin at Wildflower Woods. Stratton-Porter also documented the bird life of the region in her early nature‑photography work, most notably in her 1907 nonfiction book Birds of the Limberlost, which drew directly on her field studies in the swamp. The Indiana State Museum and Historic Sites operates Stratton-Porter's former homes as state historic sites, which are open to the public.
- Romance of the Limberlost (1938) is an American moving picture based on Stratton-Porter's writings and directed by William Nigh, and starring Jean Parker and Eric Linden. It is set in Indiana's Limberlost region in 1905.

== See also ==
- Great Black Swamp
