= The Way College of Biblical Research – Indiana Campus =

The Way College of Biblical Research Indiana
- Active: 1977–1997
- Affiliations: Christian, The Way International
- Location: Rome City, Indiana, United States

- Kneipp Springs Historic District
- U.S. National Register of Historic Places
- Location within Indiana Location within the United States
- Location: 2725 and 2730 E. Northport Rd., Rome City, Indiana
- Coordinates: 41°30′23″N 85°22′25″W
- Area: 80 acres (32 ha)
- NRHP reference No.: 100002183
- Added to NRHP: March 6, 2018

The Way College of Biblical Research Indiana was used by The Way International for its leadership training program and biblical research seminars located in Rome City, Indiana for 20 years. Purchased in 1976, the 197-acre (0.80 km^{2}) site located on the north side of Rome City previously housed the historic Kneipp Springs health spa which was developed between 1897 and 1910 by Dr. W.G. Geiermann, and operated by the Catholic Order of the Sisters of the Most Precious Blood convent. The college was not accredited.

The campus housed nearly 6,000 students and staff between 1977 and 1997, and the campus held accelerated biblical research seminars and classes from 1979 to 1996. The campus operation was moved to Gunnison, Colorado in spring of 1998, and Sylvan Springs, Inc., a non-profit group, purchased the facility for use as a family centre serving northeast Indiana.

Approximately 80 acres (32 ha) of the property was designated a historic district in 2018 and listed on the National Register of Historic Places as the "Kneipp Springs Historic District".
