= A Girl of the Limberlost (novel) =

Novel by Gene Stratton-Porter

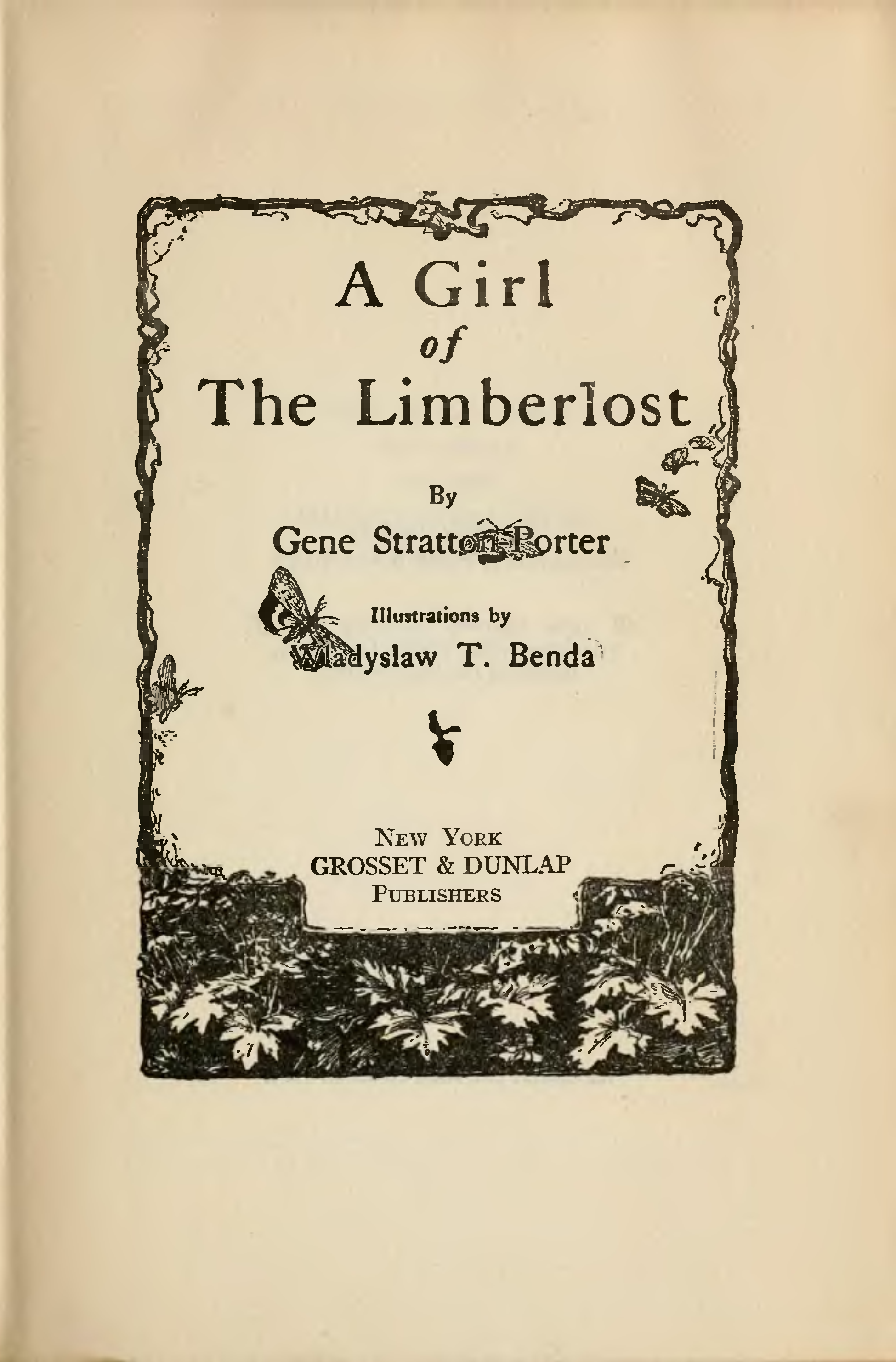
Title page

A Girl of the Limberlost, a novel by American writer and naturalist Gene Stratton-Porter, was published in August 1909. It is considered a classic of Indiana literature. It is the sequel to her earlier novel Freckles.

The story takes place in Indiana, in and around the Limberlost Swamp. Even at the time, this impressive wetland region was being reduced by heavy logging, oil extraction and drainage for agriculture. (The swamp and forestland eventually ceased to exist, though projects since the 1990s have begun to restore a small part of it.)

Patricia Raub (Senior Lecturer of American Studies at the University of Massachusetts Boston) notes that Stratton-Porter was "one of the most popular woman novelists of the era, who was known for her nature books and her editorials on McCall's 'Gene Stratton-Porter Page' as well as for her novels." Raub writes, "At the time of her death in 1924, more than ten million copies of her books had been sold – and four more books were published after her death."

== Plot summary ==
The novel is set in northeastern Indiana. Most of the action takes place either in or around the Limberlost, or in the nearby, fictional town of Onabasha.

The novel's main character, Elnora Comstock, is an impoverished young woman who lives with her widowed mother, Katharine Comstock, on the edge of the Limberlost. Elnora faces cold neglect by her mother, a woman who feels ruined by the death of her husband, Robert Comstock, who drowned in quicksand in the swamp. Katharine blames Elnora for his death, because her husband died while she was giving birth to their daughter and could not come to his rescue.

The Comstocks make money by selling eggs and other farm products, but Mrs. Comstock refuses to cut down a single tree in the forest, or to delve for oil, as the neighbors around them are doing, even though the added income would have made their lives easier.

=== Elnora as a high school student ===
Elnora is just beginning high school, where her unfashionable dresses add to her difficulty in blending in with the other students. She is determined to earn an education, which her mother derides as useless; Mrs. Comstock wants Elnora to remain at home and work as a drudge on their farm. Lack of money for tuition and books nearly derail her continued enrollment.

Her few comforts are the fact that she knows she can excel in school, especially in math and her study of nature; the kindness of her neighbors, Wesley and Margaret Sinton; that Freckles left her a valuable specimens box in the swamp; and that she succeeds in her enterprising scheme to gather and sell artifacts and moths from the Limberlost, which she can store in Freckles's box without her mother's knowledge. Elnora is smart and witty, and she loves the outdoors; her heart aches for returned love. She soon makes many friends at school.

Eventually, Elnora wins her mother's love, but only after a few emotional disasters have stricken the Comstock women.

First, after succeeding in high school for some years, Elnora feels a yearning to play the violin, as her father had done. Margaret Sinton is able to procure for her the very same violin that Robert Comstock used to play, and Elnora becomes proficient at it. She knows that her mother hates the violin, without knowing why, so she must conceal her proficiency.

Second, when Elnora is in her final year of high school, Wesley and Margaret insist that Katharine accompany them to the high school play. Katharine has no interest in seeing "what idiotic thing a pack of school children were doing." But Katharine is curious about the high school; she enters it to deride it, then finds she admires it. When she hears a violin playing, she enters the school play and discovers Elnora playing "as only a peculiar chain of circumstances puts it in the power of a very few to play." Upon seeing Elnora playing her dead husband's violin to an enthusiastic audience, and realizing that her world has changed irrevocably - "The swamp had sent back the soul of her loved dead and put it into the body of the daughter she resented, and it was almost more than she could endure and live" - Katharine faints.

Third, a few days later, Elnora believes her mother understands the need for her to graduate so she can enter college or at least teach, either of which she would love to do. She instructs Katharine that she will need new dresses for commencement and trusts her mother to supply them. Mrs. Comstock, always antagonistically honest, presents her with an old dress instead. Elnora considers this an unforgivable betrayal, a sign of her mother's disregard and lack of love for her. That night, Elnora must find a good dress elsewhere.

Fourth, Elnora has always concealed from her mother the fact that she can earn money by selling moths. As she works through her final year of high school with hopes of going to college, she finds that there is a single moth she must collect that will pay the way for her future. In the central conflict of the novel, Elnora sees her mother destroy that moth. When she protests, Mrs. Comstock slaps her. Elnora has always been patient, but now she screams that she hates her mother and rushes out. Mrs. Comstock, finally realizing how essential Elnora is to her stable home life, sets out that night to replace the moth. She worsens the situation, a result that Elnora hides from her, but when the Sintons discover that Mrs. Comstock has hit Elnora, Margaret determines on an intervention. She tells Katharine that she has been mourning for a husband who was promiscuous and planning to cheat on her. With this news, Katharine understands how she has neglected a loving, talented daughter.

=== Elnora meets Philip Ammon ===
Elnora graduates and is now 19 years old. A young man, Philip Ammon, arrives in town. His uncle, a doctor, had advised Philip to visit Onabasha to recuperate from typhoid fever. He stays with Elnora and her mother for a summer and helps Elnora gather moths. The two gradually fall in love; however, he is already engaged to another young woman, Edith Carr, who is wealthy, spoiled, and self-centered.

To pretend that she is not beginning to fall for Philip, Elnora helps him to write letters to Edith Carr and in every way encourages his marriage to his childhood friend. When Philip, after daily, prolonged conversation and fieldwork, discovers that his romantic interest in Elnora is growing, Mrs. Comstock is the first to notice, but he assures her, "I admire her as I admire any perfect creation." Mrs. Comstock replies, "And nothing in all this world spoils the average girl so quickly and so surely."

Philip Ammon is forced to return to Chicago when his father is ill, and begs of Elnora a farewell kiss; she refuses him and returns to her mother, broken-hearted.

Philip and Edith have an argument at what was supposed to be their engagement party. Edith has heard Philip talk about a wonderful young lady he met in the Limberlost. She insults him terribly and calls their engagement off (not for the first time). Philip realizes he will never love Edith, leaves home, and proposes to Elnora. On the very afternoon that he gives Elnora an engagement ring, Edith drives up (accompanied by Hart, Polly, and Tom) to the Comstocks' home, in an uninvited visit.

When Edith demands to speak to Elnora privately and swears that Elnora will never take Philip from her, Elnora is cool and polite. After Edith and the group, including Philip, leave, Elnora secretly takes off, leaving a note behind showing nothing of her plans and giving Edith the chance to prove that Philip would marry no one else. Elnora travels to stay with the O'Mores (Freckles and the Angel).

Philip becomes ill with worry about Elnora. Edith's friend Hart sees Elnora with the O'Mores and convinces Edith to let him send word to Philip of Elnora's whereabouts. Hart persuades Edith to admit that she is wrong and that Philip will marry no one except Elnora.

The story ends happily with the joyful reunion, and Edith, determined to change her previously less than noble disposition, does something uncharacteristic and humble: she finds the moth that Elnora needs, carefully captures it, and takes it to her. In the denouement, it is implied that Edith will marry Hart, just as Philip will marry Elnora.

== Characters ==
The central character of Stratton-Porter's previous novel, Freckles, is a man whose job it is to patrol and guard valuable timber trees in the Limberlost Swamp. Freckles appears in Girl of the Limberlost as a friend of Elnora. In the film, Freckles is an owl.

This partial list of characters is taken from the novel, p. xiv.

- Elnora, who collects moths to pay for her education, and lives the Golden Rule
- Philip Ammon, who assists in moth hunting, and gains a new conception of love
- Mrs. Comstock, who lost a delusion and found a treasure
- Wesley Sinton, who always did his best
- Margaret Sinton, who "mothers" Elnora
- Billy, a boy from real life
- Edith Carr, who discovers herself
- Polly Ammon, who pays an old score
- Tom Levering, engaged to Polly
- Terence O'More, Freckles grown tall
- The Bird Woman, a friend of Elnora (who stands in for Gene Stratton-Porter herself)

== Character development ==
Five characters undergo rather harsh development of character: Katharine Comstock, Margaret Sinton, Philip Ammon, Edith Carr, and Elnora herself.

- Elnora grows from an obedient, if faintly resentful, teenaged high school girl to a strong woman who is confident in her own abilities. She risks her much-hoped-for engagement to Philip Ammon, to give Edith Carr every chance to marry him.
- Katharine Comstock has always belittled and neglected her daughter Elnora. At first, she seems a stock wicked mother, but soon proves to show a great sense of humor and a love of reading, especially the works of Mark Twain. She begins to change while Elnora changes, simply by maturing. Mrs. Comstock, always antagonistically honest, deceives Elnora about purchasing new dresses for Commencement; Elnora considers this an unforgivable betrayal, a sign of her mother's disregard and lack of love for her. That night, Elnora must find a good dress elsewhere. Mrs. Comstock attends the school ceremony, feels faint when she sees how all the other students are beautifully dressed, and begins to think about her own failings:

Mrs. Comstock was dumbfounded. ... Would Elnora lead the procession in a gingham dress? Or would she be absent and her chair vacant on this great occasion? For now, Mrs. Comstock could see that it was a great occasion. ... For the first time in her life, Mrs. Comstock began to study herself as she would appear to others. Katharine Comstock undergoes, and suffers, a true change in character.

- Margaret Sinton turns from a sweet, timid woman into a rightful avenger when she discovers that Mrs. Comstock struck Elnora in the face; the Sintons have lost two small girls to disease, and they treat Elnora as another child, or at least as a niece. Maggie Sinton furiously tells Mrs. Comstock what Katharine has never wanted to know: that her husband, Robert Comstock, was preparing to cheat on her the night that he died.
- Philip Ammon has always assumed that he must marry his childhood sweetheart, Edith Carr. After meeting Elnora, he realizes that there are many forms of love, and that he has never asked what he might want in a marriage for himself.
- Edith Carr has always assumed that she will marry her childhood sweetheart, Philip, but she loves to tease him and make him jealous. She knows that she is much beloved by a strong man, Hart Henderson, but she enjoys jeering at his love for her. In the end, she confesses that Elnora is a stronger and more lovable woman than she herself is, and decides that she will stay with Hart.

== Reception ==
Widely read and popular, the novel brought fame to Stratton-Porter. The full text of the book is available online in many places, such as at ClassicReader.com. The New York Times called the novel "eminent."

Patricia Raub, in a survey of women in novels during that decade, said,

Stratton-Porter established the pattern for her heroines with her depiction of Elnora Comstock in A Girl of the Limberlost, published in 1909, and the characterization of her protagonists remained virtually unchanged thereafter. Wholesome, sensible, and beautiful, Elnora is also compassionable, self-reliant, and intelligent: 'There was no form of suffering with which the girl could not sympathize, no work she was afraid to attempt, no subject she had investigated she did not understand.' When the handsome young hero arrives on the scene, he is immediately captivated by Elnora, even though he is already claimed by a physically attractive but selfish society girl. Elnora's virtue wins her the hero. Association with Elnora prompts the society girl to reform: she vows to be more like Elnora in the future.

Another reviewer wrote that

this book's heroine is a refreshing example of a young woman whose real attractiveness lies with her courage and intelligence, especially in the face of suffering, while she still has a healthy concern about how she is 'carpentered.' She also embraces a deep love for God's creation without being a rabid environmentalist. ... Elnora's only affection is from a neighboring couple who have no children of their own. In this cold atmosphere, Elnora blossoms into a rare jewel of a person; rather than becoming embittered like her mother, she returns love for her mother's negligence and shows remarkable resourcefulness in meeting the challenges of pursuing her dreams while trying to remeain [sic] faithful to her mother's commands. ... Elnora is remarkably patient and loving while undergoing difficult trials, but rather than being an unbelievable, sickeningly-sweet character, she exhibits temper, anguish and sometimes walks a fine line between being obedient to her mother and justifying hiding certain things from her.

In an essay, Joan Aiken mentioned the description of Elnora's lunchbox as a good example of detail in writing.

== Adaptations ==
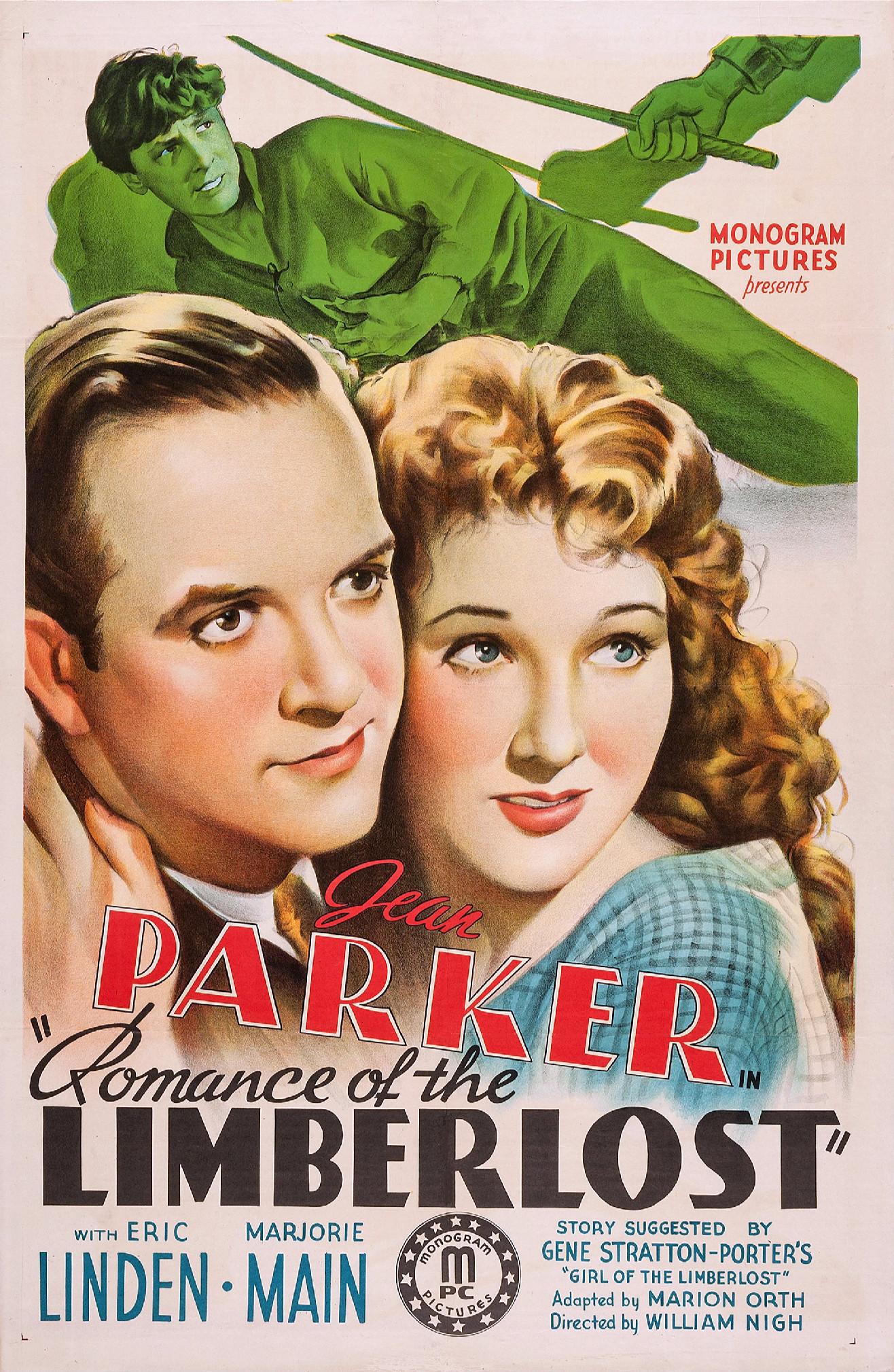
Poster for Romance of the Limberlost (1938), based in part on A Girl of the Limberlost

The novel was adapted several times for film, with versions released in 1924, 1934 and 1945. A 1990 made-for-TV version differed most from the original plot.

- 1924: A Girl of the Limberlost, starring Gloria Grey; produced by Gene Stratton Porter Productions, distributed by Film Booking Offices of America
- 1934: A Girl of the Limberlost, starring Marian Marsh; produced by Monogram Pictures
- 1938: Romance of the Limberlost, starring Jean Parker; produced by Monogram Pictures
- 1945: The Girl of the Limberlost, starring Ruth Nelson, Dorinda Clifton and Loren Tindall and directed by Mel Ferrer
- 1990: A Girl of the Limberlost (1990) at IMDb (TV movie, starring Joanna Cassidy, Heather Fairfield and Annette O'Toole and directed by Burt Brinckerhoff.
