= Gene Stratton-Porter =

American writer and naturalist (1863–1924)

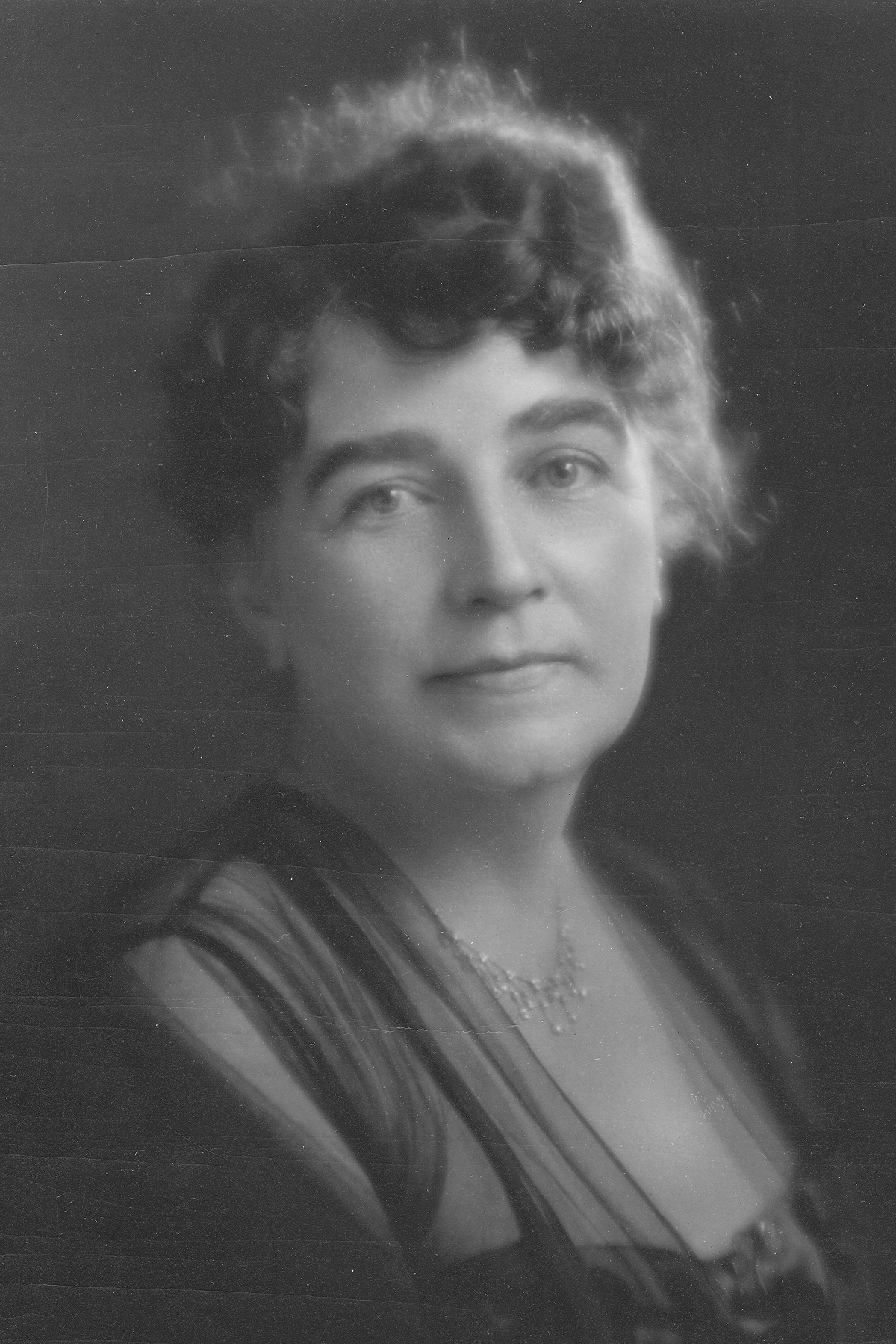
- Born: August 17, 1863; Lagro, Indiana
- Died: December 6, 1924 (aged 61); Los Angeles, California
- Occupations: Author; naturalist; nature photographer; film producer
- Writing career
- Period: 1900–1920
- Genre: Natural history

Gene Stratton-Porter (August 17, 1863 – December 6, 1924), born Geneva Grace Stratton, was an American writer, nature photographer, and naturalist from Wabash County, Indiana. In 1917 Stratton-Porter urged legislative support for the conservation of Limberlost Swamp and other wetlands in Indiana. She was also a silent film-era producer who founded her own production company, Gene Stratton Porter Productions, in 1924.

Stratton-Porter wrote several best-selling novels in addition to columns for national magazines, such as McCall's and Good Housekeeping, among others. Her novels have been translated into more than twenty languages, including Braille, and at their peak in the 1910s attracted an estimated 50 million readers. Eight of her novels, including A Girl of the Limberlost, were adapted into moving pictures. Stratton-Porter was also the subject of a one-woman play, A Song of the Wilderness. Two of her former homes in Indiana are state historic sites, the Limberlost State Historical Site in Geneva and the Gene Stratton-Porter State Historic Site on Sylvan Lake, near Rome City, Indiana.

== Early life and education ==
Geneva Grace Stratton, the twelfth and last child of Mary (Shallenberger) and Mark Stratton, was born at the family's Hopewell Farm on August 17, 1863, near Lagro in Wabash County, Indiana. Mark Stratton, a Methodist minister and farmer of English descent, and Mary Stratton, a homemaker of German-Swiss ancestry, were married in Ohio on December 24, 1835, relocated to Wabash County, Indiana, in 1838, and settled at Hopewell Farm in 1848. Geneva's eleven siblings included Catherine, Mary Ann, Anastasia, Florence, Ada, Jerome, Irvin, Leander, and Lemon, in addition to two sisters, Samira and Louisa Jane, who died at a young age. Geneva's married sister, Mary Ann, died in an accident in February 1872; her teenaged brother, Leander, whom Geneva called Laddie, drowned in the Wabash River on July 6, 1872.

In 1874 twelve-year-old Geneva moved to Wabash, Indiana, with her parents and three unmarried siblings. They initially lived in the home of Geneva's married sister, Anastasia, and her husband, Alvah Taylor, a lawyer. Geneva's mother died on February 3, 1875, less than four months after the move to Wabash. Thereafter, Geneva boarded with various relatives in Wabash until her marriage to Charles Porter in 1886. Geneva, who was also called Geneve during her youth, shortened her name to Gene during her courtship with Porter.

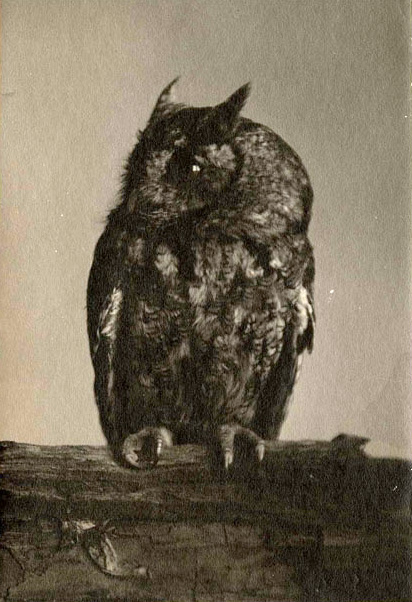
One of Stratton-Porter's early nature photographs of owls, one of her favorite birds to study and photograph.

Gene received little formal schooling early in life; however, she developed a strong interest in nature, especially birds. As a young girl, Gene's father and her brother, Leander, taught her to appreciate nature as she roamed freely around the family farm, observing animals in their natural habitats and caring for various pets.

When her father shot a red-tailed hawk, she rescued it and nursed it back to health. Her family nicknamed her “Little Bird Woman" and her father gave her “the personal and indisputable ownership of each bird of every description that made its home on his land.”

It was said of Stratton-Porter's childhood that she had been "reared by people who constantly pointed out every natural beauty, using it wherever possible to drive home a precept, the child [Stratton-Porter] lived out-of-doors with the wild almost entirely." After the family moved to Wabash in 1874, Gene attended school on a regular basis and became an avid reader. She also began music lessons in banjo, violin, and piano from her sister, Florence, and received private art lessons from a local instructor. Gene finished all but the final term of her senior year at Wabash High School. Because she was failing her classes, she made the decision on her own to quit, later claiming that she had left school to care for Anastasia, who was terminally ill with cancer and receiving treatment in Illinois.

== Marriage and family ==
In 1884 thirty-four-year-old Charles Darwin Porter saw Gene Stratton during her trip to Sylvan Lake, Indiana, where she was attending the Island Park Assembly, a Chautauqua gathering. Porter, a druggist, was thirteen years older than Stratton, who was not yet twenty-one. After ten months of regularly exchanging letters, the couple met at another gathering at Sylvan Lake, during the summer of 1885. They became engaged in October 1885 and were married on August 21, 1886. Gene Stratton-Porter kept her family surname and added her husband's after her marriage.

Charles Porter, who had numerous business interests, became a wealthy and successful businessman. Of Scots-Irish descent, he was the son and oldest child of Elizabeth and John P. Porter, a doctor. Charles owned an interest in a drugstore in Fort Wayne, Indiana, which he sold soon after his marriage, and also owned drugstores in Decatur and Geneva. He also owned and operated farms, a hotel, and a restaurant. Porter and other investors organized the Bank of Geneva in 1895. He also became a Trenton Oil Company investor. At one time he had more than sixty oil wells drilled on his land.

Gene and Charles Porter's only child, a daughter, named Jeannette, was born on August 27, 1887, when the Porters were living in Decatur, Indiana. The family moved to Geneva, in Adams County, Indiana, in 1888. Charles pursued various business interests and traveled extensively, while Gene stayed at home. Gene took pride in her family and maintaining a home, but she opposed the restrictive, traditional marriages of her era and grew bored and restless. She maintained her independence through the pursuit of her lifelong interests in nature and birdlife, and began by writing about these subjects to earn her own income. In time, she became an independently wealthy novelist, nonfiction writer, and film producer.

Stratton-Porter had four grandchildren, two granddaughters, and two grandsons. The Porters' daughter, Jeannette, married G. Blaine Monroe in 1909 and had two daughters: Jeannette Helen Monroe was born on November 27, 1911; Gene Stratton Monroe was born on March 22, 1914, and became a film actor under the stage name Gene Stratton, starring in silent films based on three of her grandmother's books. The Monroes divorced in 1920, and then Jeannette and her two daughters moved to Los Angeles, California, to live with Stratton-Porter, who had moved there in 1919. On June 6, 1923, Jeannette married James Leo Meehan, a film producer, who was Stratton-Porter's business associate. Meehan attempted to help the daughter Gene Stratton Monroe find work in talking pictures by encouraging her to act on stage at Harold Lloyd's showcase, Beverly Hills Little Theatre for Professionals, and naming her in his column for the Motion Picture Herald called "From Hollywood," saying she wanted more film work, particularly in new films based on her grandmother's books.

After the death of her brother, Lemon Stratton, in late 1915, Stratton-Porter became the guardian of his daughter, Leah Mary Stratton. Leah lived with Stratton-Porter for several years after Leah's father's death.

== Major residences ==
In 1888 Stratton-Porter persuaded her husband, Charles, to move their family from Decatur to Geneva in Adams County, Indiana, where he would be closer to his businesses. He initially purchased a small home within walking distance of his drugstore; however, when oil was discovered on his land, it provided the financial resources needed to build a larger home. The Limberlost Cabin at Geneva served as Stratton-Porter's home from 1895 to 1913. In 1912, with the profits she made from her best-selling novels and successful writing career, Stratton-Porter purchased property along Sylvan Lake, near Rome City in Noble County, Indiana, and built the Cabin at Wildflower Woods estate, which eventually encompassed 150 acres (61 hectares). Both of these properties are preserved as state historic sites.

Stratton-Porter moved to southern California in 1919 and made it her year-round residence. She purchased homes in Hollywood and built a vacation home that she named Singing Water on her property on Catalina Island. Floraves, her lavish mountaintop estate in Bel Air, was nearly completed at the time of her death in 1924, but she never lived in it.

=== Limberlost Cabin (Geneva, Indiana) ===
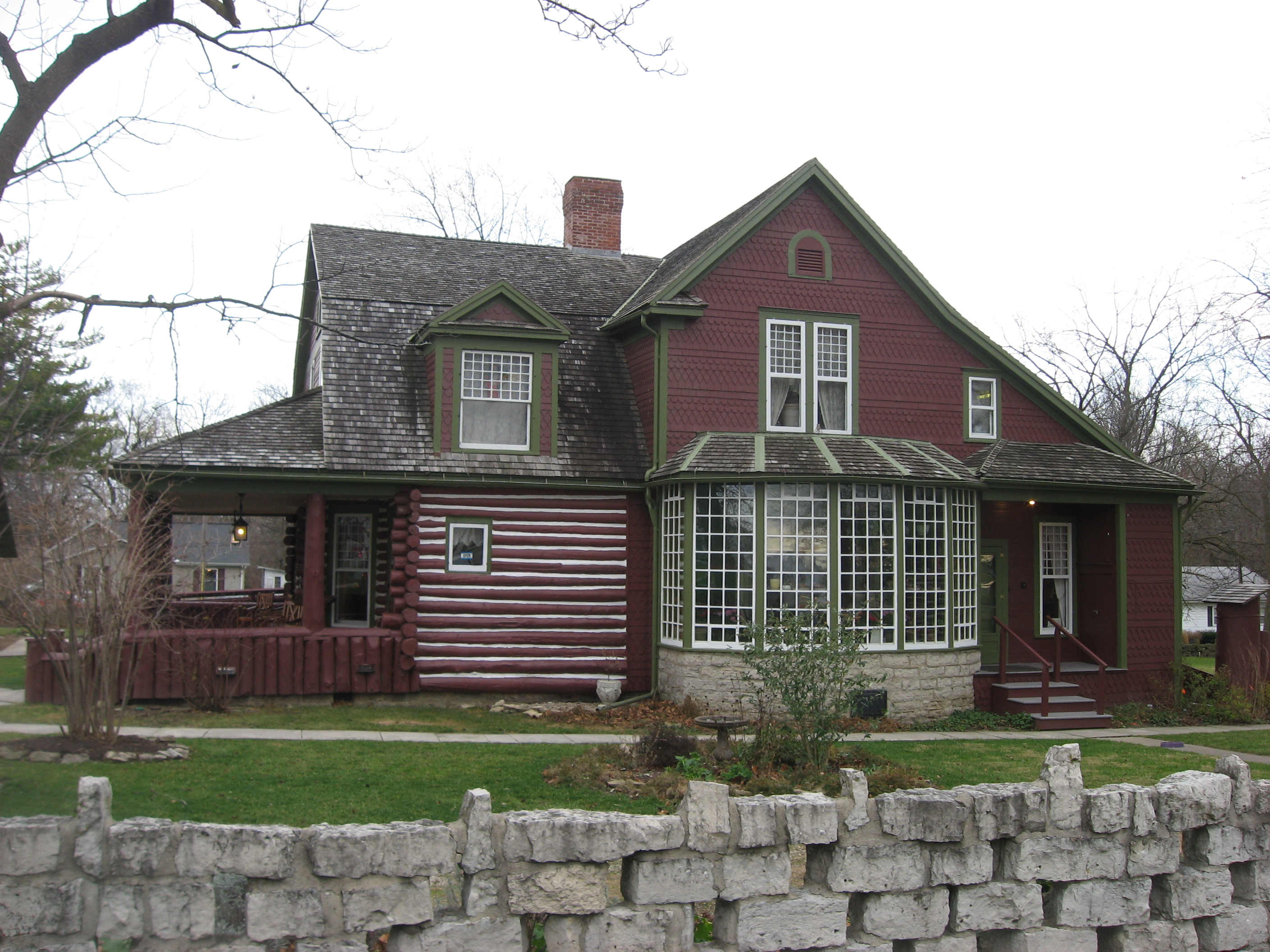
Limberlost State Historic Site, western side

Construction on a two-story, 14-room, cedar-log Queen Anne style rustic home in Geneva began in 1894 and was completed in 1895. The Porters named their new home the Limberlost Cabin in reference to its location near the 13,000-acre (5,300-hectare) Limberlost Swamp, where Stratton-Porter liked to explore and found the inspiration for her writing. Stratton-Porter lived in the cabin until 1913.

While residing in Geneva, Stratton-Porter spent much time exploring, observing nature, sketching, and making photographs at the Limberlost Swamp. She also began writing nature stories and books. The nearby swamp was the setting for two of her most popular novels, Freckles (1904) and A Girl of the Limberlost (1909). In addition, the swamp was the locale for many of her works of natural history. Stratton-Porter became known as "The Bird Lady" and "The Lady of the Limberlost" to friends and readers.

Between 1888 and 1910, the area's wetlands around Stratton-Porter's home were drained to reclaim the land for agricultural development and the Limberlost Swamp, along with the flora and fauna that Stratton-Porter documented in her books, was destroyed. In 1912 she purchased property for a new home at Sylvan Lake in Noble County, Indiana. The Porters sold the Limberlost Cabin in 1923. In 1947 the Limberlost Conservation Association of Geneva donated it to the State of Indiana. Designated as the Limberlost State Historic Site, the Indiana State Museum and Historic Sites operates the site as a house museum. It was listed in the National Register of Historic Places in 1974.

=== Cabin at Wildflower Woods ===
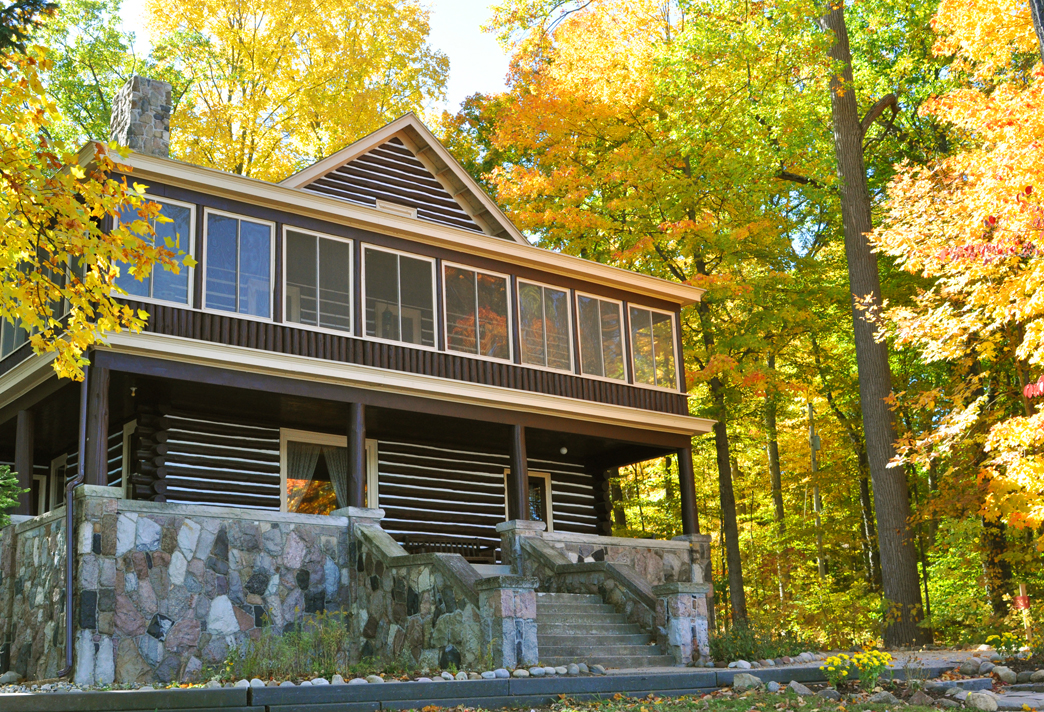
Gene's Cabin at Wildflower Woods is the present-day Gene Stratton-Porter State Historic Site on Sylvan Lake in Rome City, Noble County, Indiana.

After the Limberlost Swamp was drained and its natural resources developed for commercial purposes, Stratton-Porter sought alternate locations for inspiration. She initially purchased a small home on the north side of Sylvan Lake, near Rome City, in Noble County, Indiana, as a summer home while she looked for property to build a new residence. In 1912 she purchased lakeside property using her own funds and designed and had a new home built there in 1913. Stratton-Porter named her new home the Cabin at Wildflower Woods, which she also called Limberlost Cabin because of its similarity to the Porters' home in Geneva. While her Sylvan Lake home was under construction, Stratton-Porter found time to write Laddie (1913), her sixth novel. She moved into the large, two-story, cedar-log cabin in February 1914; her husband, Charles, who remained at their home in Geneva, commuted to the lakeside property on weekends.

Stratton-Porter assisted in developing the grounds of Wildflower Woods into her private wildlife sanctuary. Its natural setting provided her with the privacy she desired, at least initially; however, her fame attracted too many unwanted visitors and trespassers. The property's increasing lack of privacy was one of the reasons that caused her move to California in 1919. Stratton-Porter offered to sell her property to the State of Indiana in 1923 to establish a state nature preserve, but representatives of the state government did not respond. She retained ownership of Wildflower Woods for the remainder of her life. Scenes from a movie based on Stratton-Porter's book, The Harvester, were filmed there in 1927.

In 1940 the Gene Stratton-Porter Association purchased Wildflower Woods from Stratton-Porter's daughter, Jeannette Porter Meehan; in 1946 the association donated the 13-acre (5.3-hectare) property to the State of Indiana, including the cabin, its formal gardens, orchard, and pond. Designated as the Gene Stratton-Porter State Historic Site, the present-day 148-acre (60-hectare) property, including 20 acres (8.1 hectares) that were part of her original purchase, is operated by the Indiana State Museum and Historic Sites and open to the public. The property was listed on the National Register of Historic Places in 1974. In addition to the cabin, guests can explore a one-acre formal garden, wooded paths, and a 99-acre (40-hectare) wetland and prairie that is undergoing restoration. The Gene Stratton-Porter State Historic Site is supported by the Gene Stratton-Porter Memorial Society, Inc.

=== California homes ===
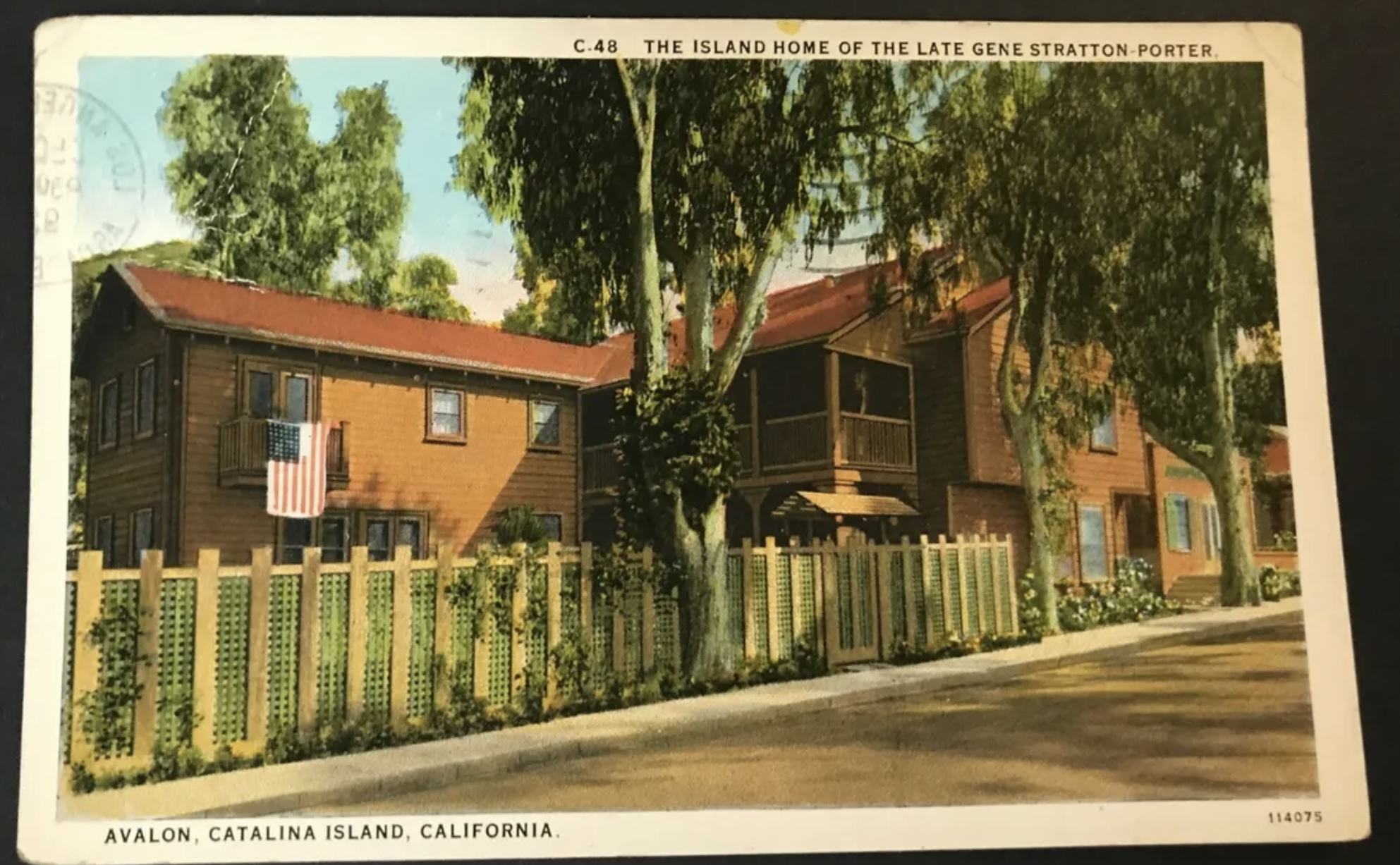
Home of author, photographer, and naturalist Gene Stratton-Porter, Catalina Island, 1926.

Lack of privacy at her home on Sylvan Lake in Indiana was among the reasons for Stratton-Porter's move to California. She arrived in southern California in the fall of 1919, intending to spend the winter months there, but enjoyed it so much that she decided to make it her year-round home. Stratton-Porter enjoyed an active social life in the Los Angeles area, made new friends, began to publish her poetry, and continued to write novels and magazine articles. In 1924 she also established her own film production company.

Stratton-Porter initially purchased a small home between Second and Third Streets in Hollywood, not far from where her Stratton relatives lived. (Stratton-Porter's sister, Catherine, and two of Stratton-Porter's nieces were already living in southern California when she moved there. Her brother, Jerome, and his wife later retired nearby.) In 1920, when Stratton-Porter's recently divorced daughter, Jeannette, and Stratton-Porter's two granddaughters relocated to California to live with her, she purchased a larger home at the corner of Serrano and Fourth Street, while Charles remained at Geneva, still active in the town's bank. After the Porters sold the Limberlost Cabin in 1923, he stayed at a Geneva boardinghouse when he was not traveling.

In early 1924 Stratton-Porter purchased two lots on Catalina Island to build a 14-room vacation retreat. The grounds of the 5-acre (2.0-hectare) property included a fountain constructed of local stone and seashells. Stratton-Porter moved into the wildlife haven in June 1924 and named it Singing Water because of the sounds emitting from the elaborate fountain. She completed her last novel, The Keeper of the Bees (1925) at Catalina Island in 1924.

By March 1924 Stratton-Porter had selected a site for an estate home in southern California in an undeveloped area west of present-day Beverly Hills that became Bel Air. Stratton-Porter was the first to build a residence there. The 22-room, English Tudor-style mansion included approximately 11,000 square feet (1,000 m^{2}) of living space and was set on a small mountaintop. The property also included a 4-car garage with servants' quarters above it, a greenhouse, outdoor ponds, and a tennis court. Stratton-Porter named her estate Floraves for flora (meaning flowers) and aves (meaning birds). She died on December 6, 1924, a few weeks before the home was completed. Her daughter, Jeannette, was the sole heir of her mother's estate.

== Job/Career ==
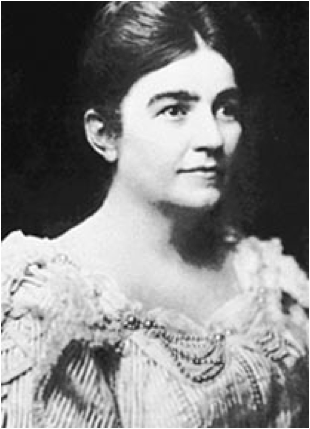
Gene Stratton-Porter

While her marriage to Charles Porter provided financial security and personal independence, Gene sought additional roles beyond those of wife and mother. She took up writing in 1895 as an outlet for self-expression and as a means to earn her own income. Stratton-Porter felt that as long as her work did not interfere with the needs of her family, she was free to pursue her own interests. She began her literary career by observing and writing about birdlife of the upper Wabash River valley and the nature she had seen during visits to the Limberlost Swamp, less than a mile from her home in Geneva, Indiana. The Limberlost Swamp, the Limberlost Cabin at Geneva, and after 1913, the Cabin at Wildflower Woods at Sylvan Lake in northeastern Indiana became the laboratories for her nature studies and the inspiration for her short stories, novels, essays, photography, and movies.

Stratton-Porter wrote twenty-six books that included twelve novels, eight nature studies, two books of poetry, and four collections of stories and children's books. Of the fifty-five books selling one million or more copies between 1895 and 1945, five of them were novels written by Stratton-Porter. Among Stratton-Porter's best-selling novels were Freckles (1904), A Girl of the Limberlost (1909), The Harvester (1911), Laddie (1913), and Michael O'Halloran (1915). Stratton-Porter incorporated everyday occurrences and acquaintances into her works of fiction. Many of her works delve into difficult subject matter such as themes of abuse, prostitution, and abandonment. In the case of Her Father's Daughter (1921), the anti-Asian sentiment that her writing reflected was prevalent in the United States during that era. Her other writing also introduced the concept of land and wildlife conservation to her readers.

Stratton-Porter preferred to focus on nature books, but it was her romantic novels that gained her fame and wealth, although she often did create an irrefutable link between nature and romance in her plotlines; nature often represents a comfort for her characters, as she felt it was for her as a child. These romantic novels generated the income that allowed her to pursue her nature studies. Her novels have been translated into twenty-three languages, as well as Braille. At its peak in the early 1910s, her readership was estimated at 50 million, with earnings from her literary works estimated at $2 million.

=== Author ===
==== Early years ====
Stratton-Porter began her career in 1895, when she sent nature photographs that she had made to Recreation magazine. Her first published article, "A New Experience in Millinery," appeared in the publication's February 1900 issue. The article described her concerns about harming birds in order to use their feathers as hat trims. At the magazine's request, Stratton-Porter also wrote a photography column called "Camera Notes." In July 1901 she switched to doing similar work for Outing, a natural history magazine. Stratton-Porter was soon submitting short stories and nature-related material to magazines on a regular basis with increasing success. Her first short story, "Laddie, the Princess, and the Pie," was published in Metropolitan magazine in September 1901. To attract a wider audience Stratton Porter decided to include fictional elements in her nature writing and began writing novels. Stratton-Porter's writing also included poetry and children's stories, in addition to essays and editorials that were published in magazines with nationwide circulation such as McCall's and Good Housekeeping.

==== Novels ====
Although it was published anonymously in 1893, circumstantial evidence suggests that Stratton-Porter's first book was The Strike at Shane's. However, Stratton-Porter never acknowledged that she had written it and its author was never revealed.

Bobbs-Merrill published her first, full-length attributed novel, The Song of the Cardinal (1903), about a red bird living along the Wabash River. The book explained how birds lived in the wild and also included her photographs. Although the novel was a modest commercial success and was warmly received by literary critics, Stratton-Porter's publisher believed that nature stories would not become as popular as romance novels. For her second novel, Stratton-Porter decided to combine nature and romance. Freckles (1904), which was published by Doubleday, Page and Company, became a bestseller. The book's popularity among readers helped to launch her career as a successful novelist, despite its lackluster reviews from critics.

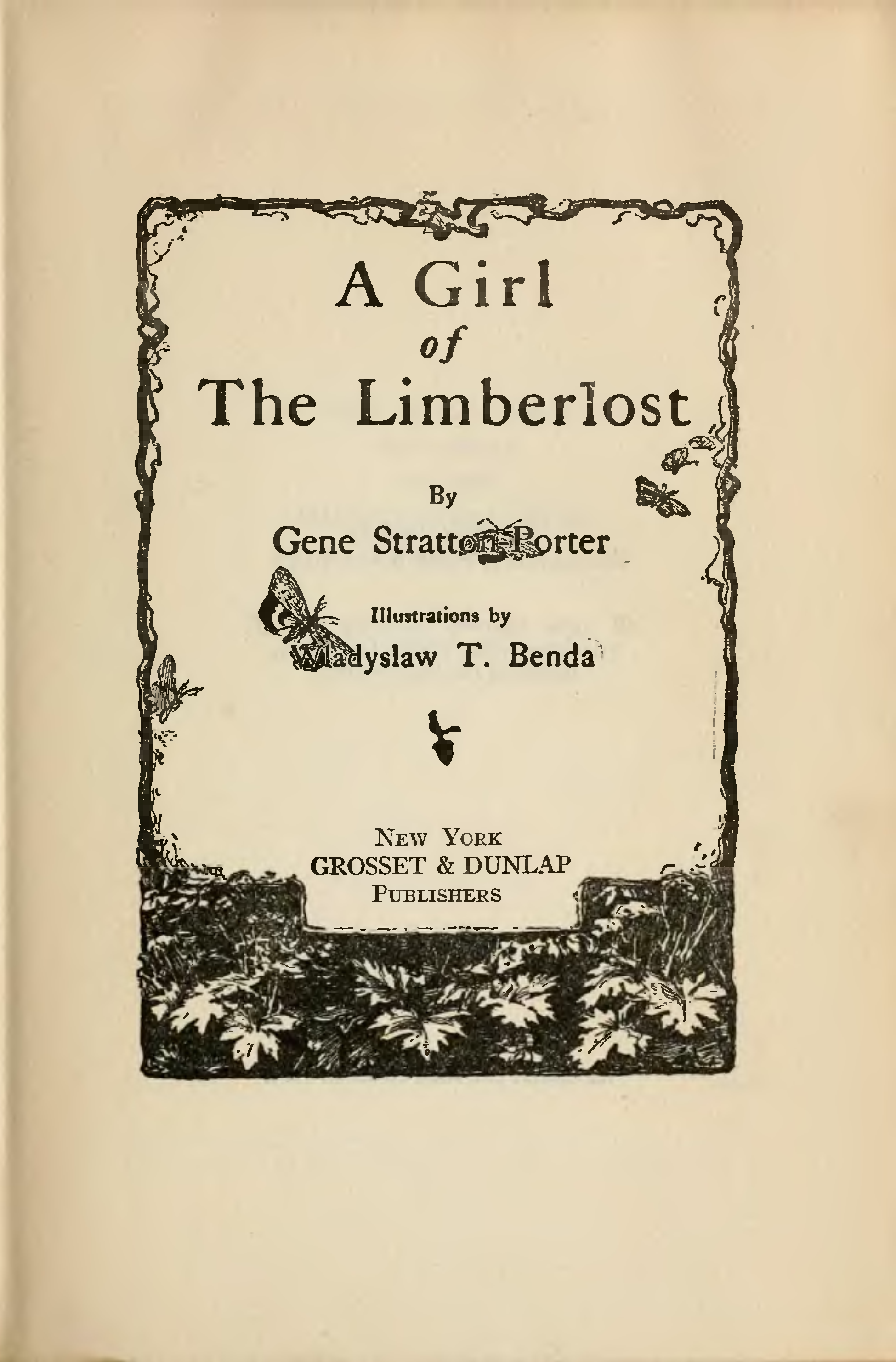
Title page

A Girl of the Limberlost (1909), which was highly successful and her best-known work, brought her worldwide recognition. Its central character, Elnora Comstock, a lonely, poverty-stricken girl living on a farm in Adams County, goes to the Limberlost Swamp to escape from her troubles and earns money to pay for her education by collecting and selling moth specimens. The main character's strong, individualistic nature is similar to Stratton-Porter's. Literary critics called the novel a "well written" and "wholesome story." Initial sales of her third novel, At the Foot of the Rainbow (1907), about two friends who enjoy fishing and trapping, were "disappointing," but Stratton-Porter reached the peak of her popularity with the publication of her next novel, The Harvester (1911), which centers around David Langston, who harvests and in turn sells medicinal herbs, and his love interest, Ruth Jameson, who embodies his ideal partner. It reached number one on the best-seller list in 1912.

Freckles (1904), A Girl of the Limberlost (1909), and The Harvester (1911) are set in the wooded wetlands and swamps of northeast Indiana. Stratton-Porter loved the area and its wildlife and had documented them extensively. Inexpensive reprints of Freckles and A Girl of the Limberlost brought Stratton-Porter to the public's attention in the United States as well as abroad. Translations of her book into other languages also increased her international audience. In 1910, when Stratton-Porter reached a long-term agreement with Doubleday, Page and Company to publish her books, she agreed to provide one manuscript each year, alternating between novels and nonfiction nature books.

Stratton-Porter's next novel, Laddie: A True Blue Story (1913), another of her best-selling novels, included elements that corresponded to her early life. It was written while she supervised construction of her home at Sylvan Lake in Noble County, Indiana, and she described it as her most autobiographical novel. The narrative is told in the first person by the twelfth child of the "Stanton" family. The title character is modeled after Stratton-Porter's deceased older brother, Leander, whom Stratton-Porter nicknamed Laddie. As in Stratton-Porter's own family, Laddie is connected with the land and identifies with their father's vocation of farming.

Michael O'Halloran (1915), her seventh novel, was inspired by a newsboy she had encountered in Philadelphia while visiting her daughter, Jeannette, and her family. A Daughter of the Land (1918), her next novel, did not sell as well as her earlier works. Over time, sales of Stratton-Porter's novels had slowly declined and by 1919 her status as a best-selling author began to fade. Undeterred, she continued to write until her death in 1924.

Her Father's Daughter (1921), one of Stratton-Porter's last novels, was set in southern California, outside Los Angeles, where she had moved around 1920. The novel is especially biased against immigrants of Asian descent. Judith Reick Long, one of Stratton-Porter's biographers, stated that World War I-era racial prejudice and nativism were prevalent in the United States and it was not unusual to be anti-Asian in southern California at that time. Barbara Olenyik Morrow, another of her biographers, explained that the book was intentionally playing to the era's ethnic prejudices. The Literary Review, ignoring its anti-Asian content, noted its "wholesome charm."

The White Flag (1923), criticized as an old-fashioned melodrama, failed to make the bestseller list; however, the story was serialized in Good Housekeeping magazine beginning in 1923, in advance of the book's release. By the time of its publication, Stratton-Porter's interests had shifted toward filmmaking.

The Keeper of the Bees (1925) and The Magic Garden (1927) were the last of Stratton-Porter's novels completed before her death. Both of them were written at her home on Catalina Island and published posthumously. The Keeper of the Bees is a story about a World War I veteran who regains his heath through the restorative "power and beauty of nature." The story was serialized in McCall's magazine from February through September 1925 and was published in book form later that year. The Magic Garden, about a girl of divorced parents, was written for her two granddaughters, whose parents divorced when they were young. Filmmaker James Leo Meehan, Stratton-Porter's business partner and son-in-law, wrote a screenplay of the novel shortly after Stratton-Porter had completed the manuscript.

Millions of copies of Stratton-Porter's novels were sold and most of them became best sellers, but the literary establishment criticized them as "unrealistic," "too virtuous," and "idealistic." Despite the criticisms, she was popular among readers of her novels. Stratton-Porter once claimed, "Time, the hearts of my readers, and the files of my publisher will find me my ultimate place."

==== Nature books ====
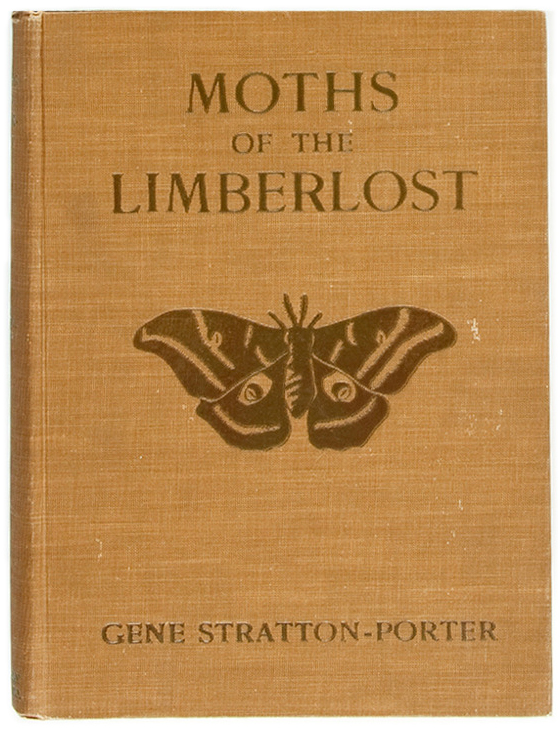
Front cover of Moths of the Limberlost (1912)

Stratton-Porter, a keen observer of nature, wrote eight nonfiction nature books that were moderate sellers compared to her novels. What I Have Done With Birds (1907) first appeared as a six-month illustrated series for the Ladies' Home Journal from April to August 1906. The Bobbs-Merrill Company published the material in book format that also includes Stratton-Porter's photographs. Birds of the Bible (1909), an illustrated reference book published by Jennings and Graham of Cincinnati, included eighty-one of Stratton-Porter's photographs. Both of these nature books were slow sellers. Music of the Wild (1910), also published by Jennings and Graham, warned of the adverse effects that the destruction of trees and swamps would have on rainfall. Her warnings appeared nearly two decades before the Dust Bowl of the 1930s and well in advance of present-day environmental concerns about climate change.

Moths of the Limberlost (1912), the nature book of which Stratton-Porter was "most proud," was dedicated to Neltje Blanchan, a fellow nature writer and the wife of her publisher, Frank Nelson Doubleday. Prior to her move to California in 1919, Stratton-Porter completed the manuscript for Homing with the Birds (1919). Praised for its content, the book described birdlife using easy-to-understand language for the general public. Wings (1923) was published a year before her death; Tales You Won't Believe (1925) was published posthumously.

While literary critics called her novels overly sentimental, academics dismissed her nature writing because they felt that her research methods were unscientific. Stratton-Porter, who was not a trained scientist, centered her field research on her own interests in observing the domestic behavior of wild birds, such as their nest-building, diets, and social behavior. Her writing tried to explain nature in ways that her readers could understand and avoided scientific jargon and tedious, dry statistics.

==== Magazine articles ====
Stratton-Porter regularly contributed articles and photographs to magazines that included Metropolitan, Recreation, Outing, Country Life in America, and Ladies' Home Journal. After her move to California in 1919, Stratton-Porter wrote articles for the Izaak Walton League's publication, Outdoor America, and a thirteen-part series of nature articles for Good Housekeeping. She also agreed to write a series of editorials for McCall's magazine in a monthly column called the "Gene Stratton-Porter's Page," beginning in January 1922. Tales You Won't Believe (1925), a collection of articles that Stratton-Porter had written for Good Housekeeping, and Let Us Highly Resolve (1927), a collection of essays that had appeared in McCall's magazine, were published after her death.

==== Children's stories and poetry ====
Morning Face (1916), a collection of children's stories that also included her photographs, was dedicated to her granddaughter, Jeannette Monroe, whom Stratton-Porter had nicknamed "Morning Face." "Symbols," her first poem to appear in a national magazine, was published in Good Housekeeping in January 1921. The Fire Bird (1922), a Native American tragedy, was the first of her long narrative poems to be published in book form. Its sales were weak and it was not well received by literary critics. In 1922 Good Housekeeping published Stratton-Porter's poem, "Euphorbia," in three installments and paid her $12,500, "the most she had ever received for her poetry." Jesus of the Emerald (1923), another of her long narrative poems, describes Tiberius Caesar's search for details of Jesus's works and appearance. Stratton-Porter explains her religious beliefs in the afterword of the book.

=== Nature photographer ===
In addition to writing, Stratton-Porter was an accomplished artist and wildlife photographer, specializing in the birds and moths that lived in the Limberlost Swamp, one of the last of the wetlands of the lower Great Lakes Basin. She also made sketches of her observations as part of her fieldwork. Stratton-Porter was especially noted for her close-up photographs of wildlife in their natural habitat. In one of her early photographic studies, she documented the development of a black vulture over a period of three months. Stratton-Porter reported in What I Have Done with Birds (1907) that the effort "yielded me the only complete series of Vulture studies ever made."

Stratton-Porter began photographing birds in the Limberlost Swamp and along the Wabash River near her home in Geneva, Indiana, after her husband, Charles, and daughter, Jeannette, presented her with a camera as a Christmas gift in 1895. She submitted some of her early photographs to Recreation magazine in the late 1890s and wrote a regular camera column for the publication in 1901. Outing magazine hired her to do similar work in 1902. Unhappy with images the magazine editors suggested to accompany her writing, she began to submit her own photographs as illustrations for her articles. She also preferred to use her own photographs to illustrate her nature books. Thirteen of her wildlife photographs were published in 1900 in the American Annual of Photography, which also included her views on her fieldwork. Many of the photographs in Music of the Wild (1910) were taken at her Sylvan Lake home in northeastern Indiana.

Stratton-Porter preferred to photograph wildlife in their natural environment. Although she hired men to help transport her cumbersome camera equipment into the field for photo shoots, she preferred to work alone. Occasionally, her husband accompanied her into the field. As Stratton-Porter gained more experience, she acquired better camera equipment, including a custom-made camera that used eight-by-ten-inch glass photographic plates. Stratton-Porter believed that the larger plates provided her with more detailed photographs of her subjects. She also developed her photographic plates in a darkroom she set up in the bathroom at Limberlost Cabin, her family's home in Geneva, Indiana, and later in her darkroom at the Cabin at Wildflower Woods along Sylvan Lake.

=== Naturalist and conservationist ===
Through her writing and photography, Stratton-Porter demonstrated "her strong desire to instill her love of nature in others in order to improve their lives and preserve the natural world." She also opposed the destruction of wetlands developed for commercial use. After the turn of the twentieth century, when the Limberlost Swamp's trees were cut for timber and its shrubs and vines were killed, the resulting commercial development, which included oil drilling, destroyed its wildlife. The swamp was drained into the Wabash River.

In 1917 Stratton-Porter became more active in the conservation movement when the Indiana General Assembly passed legislation to allow drainage of state-owned swamps in Noble and LaGrange Counties. She joined with others to urge the state legislature to repeal the law that would lead to the destruction of wetlands in northeastern Indiana. Although the law was repealed in 1920, the area's swamps were eventually drained.

In 1922 Stratton-Porter became a founding member of the Izaak Walton League, a national conservation group, and joined its efforts to save the wild elk at Jackson Hole, Wyoming, from extinction. Stratton-Porter called on the readers of Outdoor America, the league's publication, to take prompt action. She was also a strong advocate of land and wetland conservation. As she wrote in an essay, "All Together, Heave," for Outdoor America in 1922, "If we do not want our land to dry up and blow away, we must replace at least part of our trees" and urged conservation of American waterways.

=== Movie producer ===
Stratton-Porter, a "pioneer" in the Hollywood film industry, was dissatisfied with the movie adaptation of her novels by movie studios. Because she wanted more control over the production work, Stratton-Porter expanded her business ventures to include her own production studio to make moving pictures based on her novels. Eight of her novels have been made into movies.

Paramount Pictures produced Freckles, the first film based on her novels in 1917, but Stratton-Porter was unhappy with the movie because it did not closely follow her novel and decided to make her own. Stratton-Porter's first filmmaking effort was made with Thomas H. Ince on Michael O'Halloran (1923). Stratton-Porter supervised the filming and assisted the principal director, James Leo Meehan. Her daughter, Jeannette, wrote the screenplay.

In 1924 Stratton-Porter formed her own movie studio and production company. Gene Stratton-Porter Productions created moving pictures that were closely based on her novels. Before her death in December 1924, Stratton-Porter's production company had produced two films, Michael O'Halloran (1923) and A Girl of the Limberlost (1924), and she had completed her novel The Keeper of the Bees for a third film. Stratton-Porter's studio filmed The Harvester (1927) at her Wildflower Woods estate in northeastern Indiana. Film Booking Offices of America released the movies produced by Stratton-Porter's studio. None of these FBO-released films are known to survive.

Stratton-Porter's stories remained popular among filmmakers after her death. RKO Pictures, a successor to Film Booking Offices, made Freckles and Laddie in 1935. Monogram Pictures made A Girl of the Limberlost (1934), Keeper of the Bees (1935), and Romance of the Limberlost (1938). Republic Pictures released The Harvester (1936) and Michael O'Halloran (1937). The original negatives and 35mm prints of these early films are unlikely to have survived; however, some 16mm versions created for television have been acquired by private collectors.

A Girl of the Limberlost was adapted four times for film, first as a silent film produced by Stratton-Porter's production company in 1924 with Gloria Grey in the title role. The 1934 version was directed by W. Christy Cabanne and its cast included Marian Marsh in the starring role and silent-era film stars Henry B. Walthall, Betty Blythe, and Louise Dresser, an Indiana native. The 1945 version included Ruth Nelson. The 1990 made-for-television movie starred Joanna Cassidy as Stratton-Porter. Romance of the Limberlost (1938), directed by William Nigh, featured Indiana actress Marjorie Main in the role of the mean stepmother.

The Keeper of the Bees was adapted four times as a movie. It was first released a silent film in 1925, starring Robert Frazer; in 1935 as a Monogram film starring Neil Hamilton; in 1942 for Columbia Pictures; and as Keeper of the Bees in a 1947 adaptation that was loosely based on the original novel. Stratton-Porter's granddaughter, Gene Stratton Monroe, played Little Scout in the 1925 version.

== Later years ==
In later 1918, after years of years of strenuous work outdoors, battling with the Indiana state government to protect the state's wetlands, and worrying over the events of World War I, fifty-four-year-old Stratton-Porter checked into Clifton Springs Sanitarium and Clinic, a health retreat for the famous in New York. She recuperated at the resort for a month before returning to her home at Wildflower Woods and taking up new challenges as a poet, filmmaker, and editorialist. In 1919, after recovering from a serious bout of influenza and completing Homing with the Birds (1919), she decided to move to Los Angeles, California. Southern California's more temperate climate and increased social activities appealed to her. From her California home, Stratton-Porter continued to write novels and poetry, in addition a series of articles for McCall's magazine. In 1924 she founded Gene Stratton-Porter Productions, Inc. and worked with film director James Leo Meehan to create films based on her novels.

With increased business dealings and enjoying the company of many writers, artists, sculptors, and musicians, Stratton-Porter decided to establish her permanent residence in southern California. Although she retained her home at Sylvan Lake in Indiana, the Porters sold the Limberlost Cabin in Geneva, Indiana, in 1923. At the time of her death in 1924, Stratton-Porter owned Wildflower Woods in Indiana, a year-round home in Los Angeles, a vacation home on Catalina Island, and was constructing a mansion in Bel Air, California.

== Death and legacy ==
Stratton-Porter died on December 6, 1924, at the age of sixty-one, in Los Angeles, California, of injuries received in a traffic accident. Her car, driven by her chauffeur, collided with a streetcar while she was en route to visit her brother, Jerome. Stratton-Porter was thrown from the vehicle and died at a nearby hospital less than two hours later of a fractured pelvis and crushed chest. Her private funeral was held on December 11 at her South Serrano Street home in Hollywood, California. Stratton-Porter's remains were held in a temporary burial vault until 1934 and then interred at Hollywood Memorial Park Cemetery.

Stratton-Porter's husband, Charles Porter, died in 1926 and was buried in his hometown of Decatur, Indiana; their daughter, Jeannette Porter Meehan, died in California in 1977. In 1999 Stratton-Porter's two grandsons, James and John Meehan, arranged to move Stratton-Porter's remains, along with those of their mother, Jeannette Porter Meehan, to Indiana. The women's remains are interred on the grounds of the Gene Stratton-Porter State Historic Site at Sylvan Lake.

Stratton-Porter's two former residences in Indiana, the Limberlost Cabin in Geneva and the Cabin at Wildflower Woods near Rome City, have been acquired by the State of Indiana and designated as state historic sites to honor her work and relate the story of her life. The Indiana State Museum and Historic Sites operates the two properties as house museums; both of them are open to the public.

Because Stratton-Porter wrote in advance of her publishing deadlines, McCall's magazine had enough of her material to continue publishing her monthly column, the "Gene Stratton-Porter Page," in its magazine until December 1927, three years after her death. Good Housekeeping and American Magazine also published posthumously other articles that Stratton-Porter had written. In addition, four of her books were published posthumously: two novels, The Keeper of the Bees (1925) and The Magic Garden (1927), and two collections of her articles and essays, Tales you Won't Believe (1925) and Let Us Highly Resolve (1927). More recently, Indiana University Press reissued eight of Stratton-Porter's novels in the 1980s and 1990s, including A Girl of the Limberlost, which remains "among her best-loved novels"; Kent State University Press published a compilation of Stratton-Porter's poetry, Field o’ My Dreams: The Poetry of Gene-Stratton Porter (2007).

Stratton-Porter's nature photographs, correspondence, books, and magazine articles, among other materials, are housed at several repositories, including the Indiana State Library, the Indiana State Museum, and the Indiana Historical Society in Indianapolis; the Lilly Library at Indiana University in Bloomington; the Bracken Library at Ball State University in Muncie; and the Geneva branch of the Adams Public Library in Geneva, Indiana, and elsewhere.

Bertrand F. Richards, a Stratton-Porter biographer, called her "one of the best-selling writers of the first quarter of the twentieth century." She is best known for her novels and nature books; however, her poetry, children's books, and numerous essays, editorials, and monthly columns for magazines such as McCall's and Good Housekeeping are not well known today. After her move to southern California in 1919, Stratton-Porter also became one of Hollywood's first female producers and in 1924 was among the first women to form her own production company.

Stratton-Porter, who is remembered for her ambition and individualism, was also a passionate nature lover who encouraged people to explore nature and the outdoors. She especially loved birds and did extensive studies of moths. Among her lasting legacies is her early and outspoken advocacy for nature conservation. Stratton-Porter supported efforts to preserve wetlands, such as the Limberlost Swamp, and saving the wild elk at Jackson Hole, Wyoming, from extinction. She also recognized the impact that cutting down trees would have on climate change and encouraged Americans to preserve the environment. As the Izaak Walton League paid tribute to her work in its publication, Outdoor America, following her death, "if we can write her epitaph in terms of clean rivers, clean outdoor playgrounds, and clean young hearts, we shall have done what she would have asked."

== Honors and awards ==
- The Adirondack Forest Preserve Service dedicated to Stratton-Porter a memorial grove of 10,000 white pine trees at Tongue Mountain on Lake George, New York, in 1924, shortly after her death.
- The American Reforestation Association organized memorial tree plantings after her death on the grounds of Los Angeles-area schools.
- The College Woman's Salon of Los Angeles established an annual poetry award in her honor.
- R. R. Rowley named a trilobite, Pillipsia Stratton-Porteri, in her honor.
- The Purdue University Calumet campus's Porter Hall, along with the former elementary school that opened on the site in 1949, was named in her honor.
- In 2009 Stratton-Porter's portrait was added to the Hoosier Heritage Portrait Collection at the Indiana Statehouse in Indianapolis.
- In 2009 Stratton-Porter was inducted into the Indiana Natural Resources Foundation's Hall of Fame (inaugural class) as an early conservationist.
- In 2015 Stratton-Porter was inducted into Wabash High School's Hall of Distinction for her contributions to literature, ecology and photography.
- Stratton-Porter's two former residences in Indiana, the Limberlost Cabin in Geneva and the Cabin at Wildflower Woods near Rome City were designated state historic sites and listed on the National Register of Historic Places. The Indiana State Museum and Historic Sites operates the two properties as house museums.

== Selected published works ==
Stratton-Porter's novels, most of them best sellers, became popular in the first quarter of the twentieth century and were widely read. Her 26 published books include 12 novels, eight nature studies, two books of poetry, and four collections of stories and children's books.

=== Novels ===
- The Song of the Cardinal, 1903
- Freckles, 1904
- At the Foot of the Rainbow, 1907
- A Girl of the Limberlost, 1909
- The Harvester, 1911
- Laddie, 1913
- Michael O'Halloran, 1915
- A Daughter of the Land, 1918
- Her Father's Daughter, 1921
- The White Flag, 1923
- The Keeper of the Bees, 1925
- The Magic Garden, 1927

=== Nature studies ===
- What I Have Done with Birds, 1907 (Revised as Friends in Feathers in 1917.)
- Birds of the Bible, 1909
- Music of the Wild, 1910
- Moths of the Limberlost, 1912
- Friends in Feathers, 1917 (A revised and expanded edition of What I Have Done with Birds.)
- Homing with the Birds, 1919
- Wings, 1923
- Tales You Won't Believe, 1925

=== Poetry ===
- The Fire Bird, 1922
- Jesus of the Emerald, 1923
- Field o’ My Dreams: The Poetry of Gene-Stratton Porter, 2007
- "Euphorbia", 1923 (Published in Good Housekeeping in three monthly installments from January through March 1923; it was never published in book form.)

=== Children's books and collected essays ===
- After the Flood, 1911
- Birds of the Limberlost, 1914
- Morning Face, 1916
- Let Us Highly Resolve, 1927

== Film adaptations of novels ==
Eight of Stratton-Porter's novels have been made into moving pictures.

- Freckles, directed by Marshall Neilan (1917, based on the novel Freckles)
- Michael O'Halloran, directed by James Leo Meehan (1923, based on the novel Michael O'Halloran)
- A Girl of the Limberlost, directed by James Leo Meehan (1924, based on the novel A Girl of the Limberlost)
- The Keeper of the Bees, directed by James Leo Meehan (1925, based on the novel The Keeper of the Bees)
- Laddie, directed by James Leo Meehan (1926, based on the novel Laddie)
- The Magic Garden, directed by James Leo Meehan (1927, based on the novel The Magic Garden)
- The Harvester, directed by James Leo Meehan (1927, based on the novel The Harvester)
- Freckles, directed by James Leo Meehan (1928, based on the novel Freckles)
- A Girl of the Limberlost, directed by Christy Cabanne (1934, based on the novel A Girl of the Limberlost)
- Laddie, directed by George Stevens (1935, based on the novel Laddie)
- The Keeper of the Bees, directed by Christy Cabanne (1935, based on the novel The Keeper of the Bees)
- Freckles, directed by Edward Killy and William Hamilton (1935, based on the novel Freckles)
- The Harvester, directed by Joseph Santley (1936, based on the novel The Harvester)
- Michael O'Halloran, directed by Karl Brown (1937, based on the novel Michael O'Halloran)
- Romance of the Limberlost, directed by William Nigh (1938, based on the novel A Girl of the Limberlost)
- Laddie, directed by Jack Hively (1940, based on the novel Laddie)
- Her First Romance, directed by Edward Dmytryk (1940, based on the novel Her Father's Daughter)
- Freckles Comes Home, directed by Jean Yarbrough (1942, based on a sequel to the novel Freckles)
- The Girl of the Limberlost, directed by Mel Ferrer (1945, based on the novel A Girl of the Limberlost)
- The Keeper of the Bees, directed by John Sturges (1947, based on the novel The Keeper of the Bees)
- Michael O'Halloran, directed by John Rawlins (1948, based on the novel Michael O'Halloran)
- Freckles, directed by Andrew V. McLaglen (1960, based on the novel Freckles)
- A Girl of the Limberlost, directed by Burt Brinckerhoff (1990, TV film, based on the novel A Girl of the Limberlost)
- City Boy, directed by John Kent Harrison (1992, TV film, based on the novel Freckles)

== Biographical play ==
A Song in the Wilderness, a one-woman show written by Larry Gard and first performed in 1993, offers a dramatic exploration of Stratton-Porter's life and experiences. The 40-45 minute play was written for Gard's wife, actress Marcia Quick Gard, and financed by an Indiana Humanities Council grant. The play toured Indiana each spring from 1993 through 1997 and was performed in numerous Indiana towns. In March 2002 the Carpenter Science Theatre Company produced a production of the play at the Eureka Theatre in Richmond, Virginia, directed by Gard and featuring Quick in the title role.

A spring 2017 performance of the play had been scheduled in the Rhoda B. Thalhimer Theater at the Science Museum of Virginia in Richmond, but Quick died December 16, 2016. Kerrigan Sullivan, a Richmond-based actress, was cast to play the role of Stratton-Porter. Playwright Gard, director Jones, and actress Sullivan dedicated the subsequent performances to Quick's memory. The play was also performed at the Cat Theater at St. Catherine's School for Girls in Richmond and TheaterLab, also in Richmond. In addition, the play was performed at the University of Notre Dame's DeBartolo Performing Arts Center in conjunction with the Notre Dame Shakespeare Festival and the Limberlost Theatre Company in 2017. The Friends of the Limberlost presented the play in Fort Wayne, Indiana, also in 2017.
