= Freckles (1935 film) =

1935 film directed by Edward Killy and William Hamilton

- Theatrical poster for film
- Directed by: Edward Killy; William Hamilton; Charles Kerr (assistant)
- Screenplay by: Dorothy Yost
- Story by: Mary Mayes (adaptation)
- Based on: the novel, Freckles by Gene Stratton-Porter
- Produced by: Pandro S. Berman; William Sistrom (associate)
- Starring: Tom Brown; Virginia Weidler
- Cinematography: Robert de Grasse
- Edited by: Desmond Marquette
- Music by: Alberto Colombo
- Production company: RKO Radio Pictures
- Release date: October 4, 1935 (US)
- Running time: 69 minutes
- Country: United States
- Language: English

Freckles is a 1935 American drama film directed by Edward Killy and William Hamilton from a screenplay written by Dorothy Yost, adapted by Mary Mayes from Gene Stratton-Porter's 1904 novel of the same name. Two earlier adaptations of Stratton-Porter's novel had been produced, the first by Paramount in 1917, and the second in 1928 by FBO, both were also titled Freckles. This 1935 version was released by RKO Radio Pictures (which had been formed by the merger of FBO and KAO) on October 4, and stars Tom Brown, Virginia Weidler, and Carol Stone.

== Plot ==
Freckles, a young man and orphan, shows up at a lumber camp, where the local schoolteacher, Mary Arden, takes a shine to him and convinces the lumber company's owner, McLean, to hire Freckles as a guard. While working there, Freckles begins a relationship with Mary, while Laurie-Lou Duncan, a precocious young girl also befriends Freckles and helps him learn more about the forest and the plants it contains. Laurie-Lou has a pet bear cub, and one day when the cub is in danger of being injured by a tree about to be felled by the lumberjacks, she attempts to untie it, but the tree begins to fall before she can finish. Seeing her danger, Freckles rushes to her, and pulls her out of the way of the falling tree. The bear cub, Cubby, is injured, but survives his injuries.

Laurie-Lou also meets Jack Carter, a felon, who is hiding out in a cabin in the woods with several friends of his, who happen to be bank robbers. Carter gets on Laurie-Lou good side by carving wooden soldiers for her. Wanting him to make a figure she is missing from her set, she hides in his car to follow him to his home, hoping to convince him to make it for her. However, once there, she is held captive by Carter's felon friends.

When she doesn't return, Freckles tracks her to Carter's cabin, where he too is captured. However, he surprises his captors by escaping, although he is wounded by a gunshot during his exit. He does not abandon Laurie-Lou, instead returning to the room where she is being held, and barring the door. As the felons attempt to break in, she shows him where a gun and ammo are kept. Unfamiliar with the weapon, he fumbles to load it as the bank robbers get close to gaining entry. Just in time, he loads the weapon, surprising the criminals and holding them at bay. He is becoming weak from loss of blood when Arden arrives with the police, having learned of their location from Laurie-Lou's mother. The criminals are captured, and Freckles and Arden agree to marry.

== Cast ==
- Tom Brown as Freckles
- Virginia Weidler as Laurie-Lou Duncan
- Carol Stone as Mary Arden
- Lumsden Hare as McLean
- James Bush as Ralph Barton
- Dorothy Peterson as Mrs. Duncan
- Addison Richards as Jack Carter
- Richard Alexander as Wessner
- George Lloyd as Al Waters
- Louis Natheaux as Lefty
- Wade Boteler as Butch

== Production ==
RKO announced in July 1934 that Freckles would be one of eight classic works on their production schedule for 1934–35, production was set for later that year in December. At the time, the novel was one of the best-selling books of all time. In February 1935, it was reported that Jess Smith had been assigned to adapt Gene Stratton-Porter's book into a screenplay. It was one of two of Stratton-Porter's works scheduled for production by RKO that season, the other being Laddie. In the middle of February, Anne Shirley was announced as being attached to the picture. In April 1935, John Robertson had been attached to the project as the director, while Pandro S. Berman was announced as the producer. Virginia Weidler was added to the cast in May 1935. In early July it was revealed that Carol Stone would be part of the cast, and that production would begin on July 8. In mid-July Robertson was replaced by a directing team consisting of Edward Killy and William Hamilton. The two had worked on several films together, with Killy as the assistant director and Hamilton as the editor. The following week it was announced that Tom Brown would star opposite Stone, followed the next day by the addition of Addison Richards to the acting crew. At about the same time, it was announced in the trade papers that the film was scheduled for release on August 23. The cast was further filled out the following week with the addition Lumsden Hare, James Bush, and Richard Alexander. By the end of July the film was in production on location outside of Sonora, California, and Dorothy Peterson was added to the cast. At the beginning of August, Louis Natheaux and Wade Boteler had been added to the cast as two of the bank robbers. In the first week in August, the release date was pushed back to September 27. The film had completed shooting by August 10, and had begun the editing process. Although the film was reported as completed by the middle of August, well in time for its scheduled September opening, on September 28 the premier date was pushed further back to October 4. The Chicago Legion of Decency graded the film class A, declaring it suitable for all audiences.

== Reception ==
Harrison's Reports found the film enjoyable, calling it a good family film. They highlighted the performance of Virginia Weidler, who they called the film's "real attraction". They also found Tom Brown's performance appealing. The Film Daily called the picture a "pleasing sentimental romance," although they found it a bit slow for most of the picture, finally picking up its pace towards the end. They found the direction of the dual helmsmen good, and particularly lauded the camera work of Robert de Grasse. Motion Picture Daily felt the film was a "human and believable production," and delighted in Weidler's performance. They said that she won "laugh after laugh with a quiet, natural comedy." They applauded Yost's adaptation, and felt the supporting cast did admirably. A "drama not lacking in comedy and photographed in an atmosphere of rustic locales ... a simple and understandable story that is concerned chiefly with human emotions, the picture is one for the entire family," is how the film was described by the Motion Picture Herald. The magazine particularly praised the performance of Brown, and also felt that Weidler's acting was "of the highest order." The New York Times commented that the film was “an agreeable specimen of the homespun drama” and that it “retains the stimulating flavor of the Indiana backwoods country of thirty-odd years ago.” They concluded their review by stating that the film was “directed at a leisurely pace” and “boasts a handsome physical production.” The Northern Star described Freckles (1935) as a “drama of love and action” and “a pictorial feast of towering trees, rushing streams, fertile valleys and glimpses wild life rarely equalled on the screen,” and described Freckles as a “friendless boy” who must prevail over desperate odds. Additionally, the newspaper commended the acting of Brown as “one of the most capable of the younger screen players” and Wielder who “gives a performance that is uncanny in its charm and realism.” Most critics left a positive review with many commenting on the stellar performance of the actors in the film.

== Legacy ==
Freckles was shown on March 26, 2010, at the 30th Cinefest convention in Syracuse, New York, a small local film festival celebrating early 20th-century classic films. To this day, Freckles survives and is fortunately not lost to time; however, the film only survives in a private collection with its owner unknown and with its copyright renewed. Because of this, Freckles is not available for the public to view online nor on DVD or Blu-Ray and can only be seen at a few archival screenings like the 2010 Cinefest convention in Syracuse, New York. Freckles is one of many films like Keeper of the Bees (1947) that have unknown rights-holders and are thus unavailable for public viewing.
