= Freckles (1960 film) =

1960 film by Andrew V. McLaglen

- Theatrical poster
- Directed by: Andrew V. McLaglen
- Written by: Harry Spalding
- Based on: Freckles by Gene Stratton-Porter
- Produced by: Harry Spalding
- Starring: Martin West; Carol Christensen; Jack Lambert
- Cinematography: Floyd Crosby
- Edited by: Harry W. Gerstad
- Music by: "By" Dunham; Henry Vars
- Production company: Associated Producers Inc
- Distributed by: 20th Century Fox
- Release dates: October 19, 1960 (Bismarck, North Dakota)
- Running time: 83 minutes
- Country: United States
- Language: English
- Budget: $250,000

Freckles is a 1960 American Western film directed by Andrew V. McLaglen. It stars Martin West and Carol Christensen. It was filmed in CinemaScope and DeLuxe Color, and is the fourth of five adaptations of Gene Stratton-Porter's 1904 novel of the same name.

== Plot ==
Disabled by a missing hand since childhood, Freckles (Martin West) works for timber baron John McLean (Roy Barcroft). He rounds up a gang of lumber thieves headed by Duncan (Jack Lambert). John's foreman, Duncan, gives Freckles a tour and points out the troubles they have been facing due to a gang of timber thieves, led by Jack Barbeau. Freckles begs to be a guard that requires him to be alone in a small, isolated cabin. John eventually agrees, and Freckles is quick to start patrolling a large area of land on horseback with a rifle in hand.

One day, Freckles meets a naturalist, Alice Cooper, who is photographing birds. Alice asks Freckles to watch her niece, Chris, who lives nearby. Meanwhile, Chris has fallen and hurt herself. A fisherman, who ends up being Barbeau, helps her. Freckles arrives and tells Barbeau he is on private property and must leave. Later in the day, Wessner, one of John's men who is actually secretly working for Barbeau, tries to bribe Freckles while in his cabin. Freckles refuses and a fistfight breaks out, which Freckles wins. John sees this confrontation, and is pleased with how Freckles acted and assures him that he will always have a job.

A few days later, Chris and Freckles spend more time getting to know one another. While on the job, Freckles is approached by Barbeau, who tells him that his family was in the woods long before John, and they only cut what they need. He tells Freckles that he is working for the wrong side. When Freckles tells Duncan about this encounter, Duncan tells him not to listen to Barbeau's story.

The next day, Freckles learns from Alice that Chris's parents are sending her to college. Freckles stops by Chris's house and meets her father. At this point, Freckles and Chris are in love, and Freckles is worried that college will change her. They fight, and Freckles leaves. He returns to the Limberlost, where Barbeau and his men are cutting down trees. Freckles gathers MacLean and his crew to confront the lumber thieves, but they are too late. Freckles blames himself for both the theft and the thieves' escape.

This story of love, competition, and rivalry ends with the death of Barbeau, guilt, and the union of Freckles and Chris.

== Cast ==
- Martin West as Freckles
- Carol Christensen as Chris Cooper
- Jack Lambert as Duncan
- Steve Peck as Jack Barbeau
- Roy Barcroft as John McLean
- Lorna Thayer as Alice Cooper
- Ken Curtis as Wessner
- John Eldredge as Mr. Cooper

== Production ==
The film was made by Robert L. Lippert's Associated Producers Inc. It was filmed on location in San Bernardino National Forest.

== See also ==
- List of American films of 1961
- List of American films of 1960
