= Freckles (1917 film) =

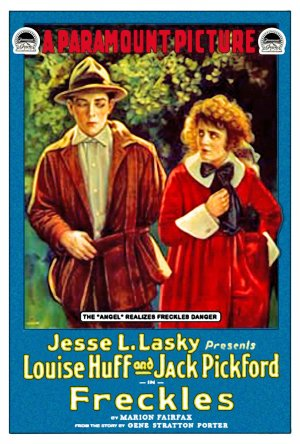
- Theatrical release poster
- Directed by: Marshall Neilan
- Screenplay by: Gene Stratton-Porter; Marion Fairfax
- Produced by: Jesse L. Lasky
- Starring: Jack Pickford; Louise Huff; Hobart Bosworth; Lillian Leighton; William Elmer; Guy Oliver
- Cinematography: Walter Stradling
- Production company: Jesse L. Lasky Feature Play Company
- Distributed by: Paramount Pictures
- Release date: May 28, 1917
- Running time: 50 minutes
- Country: United States
- Language: English

Freckles is a lost 1917 American drama silent film directed by Marshall Neilan and written by Gene Stratton-Porter and Marion Fairfax. The film stars Jack Pickford, Louise Huff, Hobart Bosworth, Lillian Leighton, William Elmer and Guy Oliver. The film was released on May 28, 1917, by Paramount Pictures.

== Cast ==
- Jack Pickford as Freckles
- Louise Huff as Angel
- Hobart Bosworth as John McLean
- Lillian Leighton as Bird Woman
- William Elmer as Black Jack
- Guy Oliver as Duncan
