= Martin West (actor) =

American actor (1937–2019)

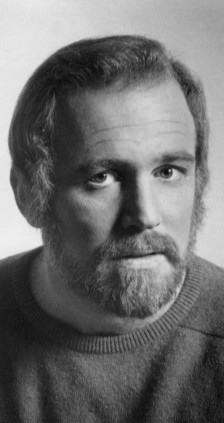
- Born: Martin Weixelbaum; August 28, 1937; Westhampton, New York, U.S.
- Died: December 31, 2019 (aged 82); Westport, Connecticut, U.S.
- Occupation: Actor
- Years active: 1959–1990
- Spouse(s): Carol A. Heller (1967 - 1971, her death); Carolyn K. Barsky (1975- 1979, divorce); Suzie Galler (1980 - 1997, divorce)
- Partner: Ann Chernow (1998–2019)
- Children: 3

Martin West (born Martin Weixelbaum; August 28, 1937 – December 31, 2019), was an American actor of film and television best known for playing the grieving father Lawson in John Carpenter's Assault on Precinct 13 and the lead role in Freckles.

West played doctor Phil Brewer in General Hospital and Don Hughes in As the World Turns. His work also includes appearances in films including Soldier Blue and Mac and Me and as guest star in television programs including Perry Mason, Gunsmoke, The Lieutenant, Rango, The Invaders, Have Gun Will Travel, and Matlock. West's final TV acting appearance was in an episode of The New Adam-12 before retiring from acting in 1990.

On Broadway, West portrayed a Union soldier in The Andersonville Trial (1959).

After he moved to Westport, Connecticut, West acted and directed with the Theatre Artists Workshop and produced a documentary about older artists from that area.

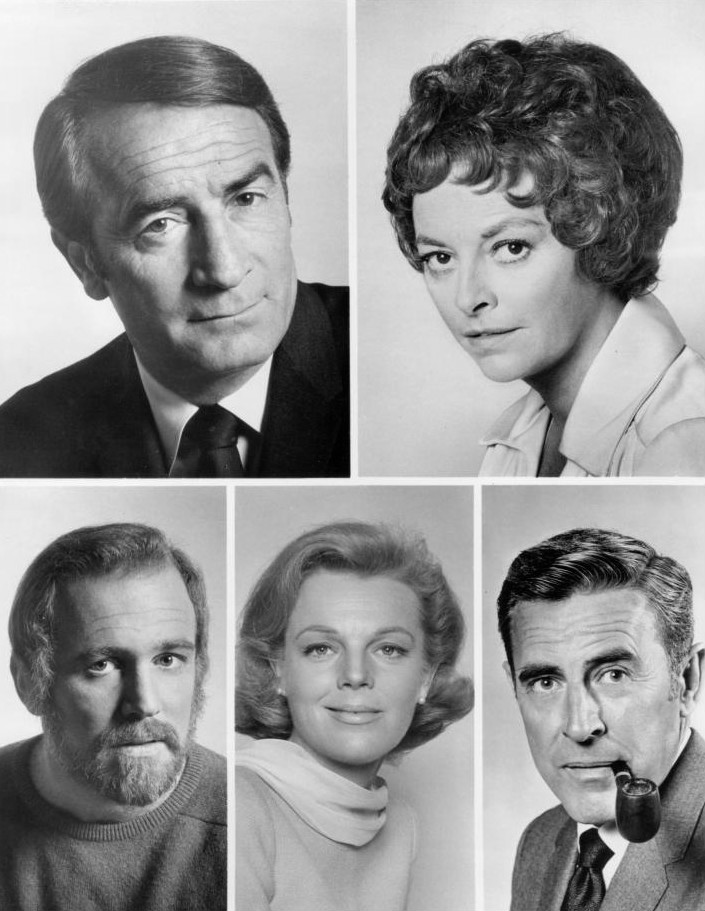
Cast of General Hospital 1973 (top): John Beradino, Emily McLaughlin (bottom): Martin West, Rachel Ames, Peter Hansen

In 1967, West married Carol A. Heller and remained married to her until her death in 1971. Marrying Carolyn K. Barsky in 1975, West had his first of three children. The two later divorced in 1979.

On New Year's Eve 1980, West married actress Suzie Galler after meeting her on the set of Der Preis fürs Überleben, a film in which they co-starred. They had two children together before making the move from Los Angeles to Connecticut in 1993, ultimately divorcing in 1997. The following year, West met artist Ann Chernow at a mutual friend's party. Ann remained his partner until his death.

On December 31, 2019, West died in Norwalk Hospital at age 82.

== Filmography ==
Year	Title	Role	Notes
1960	Freckles	Freckles	
1961	The Sergeant Was a Lady	Cpl. Gale Willard	
1963	The Man from Galveston	Stonewall Grey	
1963	Captain Newman, M.D.	Patient	Uncredited
1965	The Girls on the Beach	Duke	
1965	A Swingin' Summer	Turk	
1966	Lord Love a Duck	Bob Bernard	
1966	Harper	Deputy	
1968	Sweet November	Gordon	
1970	Soldier Blue	Lt. Spingarn	
1976	Family Plot	Sanger	
1976	Assault on Precinct 13	Mr. Lawson	
1980	Der Preis furs Uberleben	Joseph C. Randolph	
1985	Hellhole	Rollins	
1987	Best Seller	Mature Cop	
1988	Mac and Me	Wickett	
1989	Listen to Me	Justice Blyleven	
