= Michael O'Halloran (novel) =

1915 novel by Gene Stratton-Porter

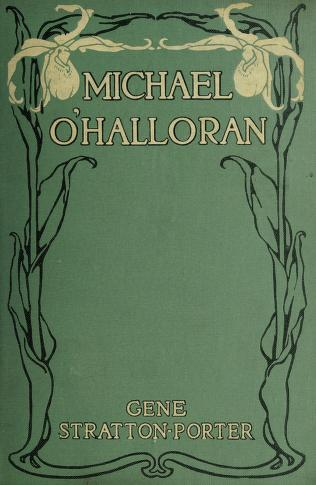
- Author: Gene Stratton-Porter
- Language: English
- Genre: Drama
- Publication date: 1915
- Publication place: United States
- Media type: Print

Michael O'Halloran is a 1915 novel by the American writer Gene Stratton-Porter.

== Film adaptations ==
It has been turned into films on three occasions:

- Michael O'Halloran (1923 film), a silent film
- Michael O'Halloran (1937 film), a sound film
- Michael O'Halloran (1948 film), a sound film

== Bibliography ==
- Taves, Brian. Thomas Ince: Hollywood's Independent Pioneer. University Press of Kentucky, 2012.
