= Little Mickey Grogan =

1927 film

- Directed by: James Leo Meehan
- Screenplay by: Dwight Cummins; Dorothy Yost; Charles Kerr
- Story by: Arthur Guy Empey
- Starring: Frankie Darro; Lassie Lou Ahern; Jobyna Ralston; Carroll Nye; Eugene Jackson; William Scott; Vadim Uraneff
- Cinematography: Allen G. Siegler
- Edited by: Dwight Cummins; Edward Schroeder
- Production company: Film Booking Offices of America
- Distributed by: Film Booking Offices of America
- Release date: December 27, 1927
- Running time: 60 minutes
- Country: United States
- Language: English

Little Mickey Grogan is a 1927 American comedy-drama film directed by James Leo Meehan and written by Dwight Cummins, Dorothy Yost and Charles Kerr. The film stars Frankie Darro, Lassie Lou Ahern, Jobyna Ralston, Carroll Nye, Eugene Jackson, William Scott and Vadim Uraneff. The film was released on December 27, 1927, by Film Booking Offices of America.

== Plot ==
Mickey Grogan (Frankie Darro), a nine-year old vagabond of the streets, assumes the responsibility for the well-being of a fellow homeless waif (Susan Dale, played by Lassie Lou Ahern), a sensitive architect named Jeffrey Shore (Carroll Nye) who is out of work for being too poor to pay for an operation necessary to save his remaining vision, and a kind-hearted office worker (Winnie, played by Jobyna Ralston) who is being stalked by a belligent Al Nevers (Billy Scott) as his overbearing attentions increasingly turn violent. On top of this, he also helps an industrialist (Crauford Kent) who is looking for a new factory design for his upcoming fleet of buildings, ones showcasing "plenty of light and air." In between the assistance he gives others, he tries to make a living from selling discarded items from the city dump and provides moments of vivacious street entertainment with fellow dancers Susan Dale and a strangely uncredited Eugene Jackson.

== Thematic and Stylistic Influences ==
In his lengthy analysis of the film, film scholar and historian Jeffrey Crouse writes that "Little Mickey Grogan begins as if what we were watching was a kind of forerunner of Italian neorealism, like Jean Renoir's Toni or Yasujiro Ozu's An Inn at Tokyo (both 1935), or the type of Zolaesque social realist cinema exercised during the silent era in such films as La Roue (Gance, 1923) or The Salvation Hunters (von Sternberg, 1925). ... [However] [i]f the viewer conceives of Little Mickey Grogan as a work of proto-neorealism, it is a perception that the movie soon corrects. Instead, it emerges neither as a neorealist film nor as a Buñuelian-type surrealist text, but as an engagingly well-polished thematic and stylistic example of what would become, with the consolidation of the studio system around 1930, classical Hollywood cinema.

== Production Background ==
Little Mickey Grogan is based on syndicated stories of the same name written by Arthur Guy Emprey, whose war experiences fighting as an American in the British army during World War I served as the material for his 1917 book, Over the Top, a big commercial success that sold a quarter of a million copies. Although noting the differences between them, Crouse theorizes that Emprey might have conceived of the character Mickey Grogan based on his time in France where Louis Feuillade's Bout de Zan formed the basis of a popular serial that ran from 1912 to 1916. FBO acquired the rights to serve as a vehicle for child actor Frankie Darro, one of the studio's top emerging stars. Fresh off the success of her role as Little Harry in Universal's epic, Uncle Tom's Cabin (Pollard, 1927), Lassie Lou Ahern was cast opposite him. To give the film extra star power, accomplished Harold Lloyd costar Jobyna Ralston was added. Made in-between her leading roles in Ted Wilde's The Kid Brother and William Wellman's Wings, 1927 turned out to be her crowning year.

The force that brought the Emprey stories to FBO was writer Gene Stratton-Porter, one of the biggest bestselling authors of the early twentieth century, of which A Girl of the Limberlost (1909) is her most well-known. She formed her own production company to have control over the screen adaptations of her works, as well as those by other family-friendly authors. After her unexpected death in 1922, her daughter Jeanette Stratton-Porter took over, following her mother's original conception. She hand-picked screenwriters, directors (including husband, James Leo Meehan), camera operators, and film editors. They released their work through the American arm of the British distribution company, the Robertson-Cole Corporation, and eventually through the FBO. Among the artists who worked with Jeanette Stratton-Porter were the notable contributions of women. Chief among them were Dorothy Yost (who, along with husband Dwight Cummins, was the script writer on Little Mickey Grogan), as well as fellow writers Marion Orth and Adele S. Buffington."Yost's work is marked by an ethical current that runs through [her scripts], and as such figure as tales of moral uplift. In addition, she was also known for scripts that featured characters from a range of diverse cultural backgrounds. She did not shy away from a view of humanity that took in and showed different ethnic groups." All of this is reflected in Little Mickey Grogan. In this sense, a Whitmanesque strain runs through the film, syncing well with Emprey and Stratton-Porter's sensibilities.

== Restoration ==
Restoration on Little Mickey Grogan begin in 2015 when surviving cast member Lassie Lou Ahern approached Jeffrey Crouse to ask whether her final silent film existed anymore. (Surpassed only by Diana Serra Cary's "Baby Peggy," Ahern would prove to be the last Hollywood performer who enjoyed a substantial career in 1920s film.) After a worldwide search, an original 35mm nitrate copy was found at the Lobster Film Archive in Paris. Through a crowd source funding campaign, a digital copy of it was made by film preservationist Eric Grayson, and work on restoring the movie was performed by Grayson, Thad Komorowski, and Nevada State College students Aubrey Balzart and Cinnamon Stephens. A newly commissioned score was written by Dr. Philip Carli. Meanwhile, the film's intertitles were changed back to the English ones from the lone French print using an original copy of the script that Ahern still possessed. In addition, a 50-minute documentary on Ahern's career, Lassie Lou Ahern: A Voice for the Silent Age was made in 2016, and in 2018 a 7,000 word assessment of the film by Crouse appeared as well as a commentary track recorded of Ahern discussing the film and aspects of her silent film career. Among those who championed the restoration were Kevin Brownlow, Diana Serra Cary, George Toles, Leonard Maltin, Michael Feinstein, David Shepard, Guy Maddin, and Carol Cling.

Owing to very complex issues of copyright, a release of the film, with several bonus features, was delayed until the film entered the public domain on January 1, 2023. A combination Blu-ray and DVD release of the film was issued in spring, 2026. The features contained on the double disc include: the 2k restoration of the film, liner notes/essay booklet by Jeffrey Crouse, the documentary Lassie Lou Ahern: A Voice for the Silent Age mentioned above, a commentary with Lassie Lou Ahern and Jeffrey Crouse (also likewise mentioned), a commentary track with Frankie Darro biographer John Gloske, and a commentary track featuring Eric Grayson as he discusses the trials and tribulations experienced by the project team during the several year effort to realize this restoration from start to finish. The commentary track with Ahern might well be the last instance of a silent film star discussing her on work for posterity.

In 2020, filmmaker Yves Jeuland directed a 145 minute documentary on Charlie Chaplin titled Charlie Chaplin, Le Génie de la Liberté which features a 30 second extract from Little Mickey Grogan. The film played at the 2020 Cannes Film Festival, and was later aired on French television. The producer was Serge Bromberg.

== Historical value ==
Little Mickey Grogan is the only FBO film starring Frankie Darro known to have survived. It is also the sole Gene Stratton-Porter Production Company motion picture distributed through FBO known to exist today. Of the 449 films made by FBO, just 123 remain. Interestingly, there is an ostentatious shot in the film in which a large billboard advertises another FBO film, the now lost Judgment of the Hills released earlier in 1927, and also featuring star Darro, director Meehan, screenwriter Yost, and editor Allen G. Siegler.

== Cast ==
- Frankie Darro as Mickey Grogan
- Lassie Lou Ahern as Susan Dale
- Jobyna Ralston as Winifred Davidson
- Carroll Nye as Jeffrey Shore
- William Scott as Al Nevers
- Vadim Uraneff as Crooked
- Don Bailey as Truant Officer
- Crauford Kent as Mr. Cabel
- Eugene Jackson as Dancing Boy (Uncredited)
- Mary Gordon as Landlady (Uncredited)
- Bert Roach as Intimidated Man (Uncredited)
