= The Man with My Face =

'The Man with My Face may refer to:

- The Man with My Face (novel), 1948 American mystery by Samuel W. Taylor
- The Man with My Face (film), 1951 American noir filmed in Puerto Rico
- "Man with My Face" (Altered Carbon), a 2018 television episode
