= Charles Kerr (filmmaker) =

American filmmaker

- Born: April 6, 1892; Chattanooga, Tennessee, United States
- Died: February 14, 1954 (aged 61); Los Angeles, California, United States
- Occupation: Assistant director
- Years active: 1925-1951

Charles Kerr (April 6, 1892 – February 14, 1954) was an American assistant director who worked in both the silent and sound film eras. While he never was the main individual behind the helm, Kerr was an assistant director on over fifty feature films, and a production manager on several more. He was also involved in the creation of five screenplays, co-authoring three of them.

Born in Chattanooga, Tennessee on April 6, 1892, he would break into the film industry as an assistant director on the 1925 film Three Wise Crooks. Initially, he would work almost exclusively with the director James Leo Meehan at FBO Pictures, and would continue on at RKO Radio Pictures after its creation by merging FBO with the KAO theater chain, under RCA. He would remain at RKO until 1937, when he moved over to United Artists. His career would begin to dwindle during the 1940s, although he would co-author two screenplays during that decade: Li'l Abner in 1940 and 1946's Vacation in Reno. During his career he would work with such notable directors as Gregory La Cava, Lew Landers, and William Dieterle.

== Filmography ==
(as per AFI's database)

Year	Title	Role	Notes
1925	Three Wise Crooks	Assistant director	
1926	Laddie	Assistant director	
1926	The Timid Terror	Assistant director	
1927	The Harvester	Assistant director	
1927	Judgment of the Hills	Assistant director	
1927	Little Mickey Grogan	Assistant director	
1927	The Magic Garden	Assistant director	
1927	Mother	Assistant director	
1927	Naughty Nanette	Assistant director	
1928	The Circus Kid	Assistant director	
1928	The Devil's Trademark	Assistant director	
1928	Gang War	Assistant director	
1928	The Perfect Crime	Assistant director	
1928	Son of the Golden West	Assistant director	
1928	Wallflowers	Assistant director	
1928	Young Whirlwind	Assistant director	
1929	The Air Legion	Assistant director	
1930	Lovin' the Ladies	Assistant director	
1930	Second Wife	Assistant director	
1931	Consolation Marriage	Assistant director	
1931	Traveling Husbands	Assistant director	
1931	The Sin Ship	Assistant director	
1932	Little Orphan Annie	Assistant director	
1933	Bed of Roses	Assistant director	
1933	One Man's Journey	Assistant director	
1934	Two Alone	Assistant director	
1934	Their Big Moment	Assistant director	
1934	The Crime Doctor	Assistant director	
1934	His Greatest Gamble	Assistant director	
1935	Grand Old Girl	Assistant director	
1935	Captain Hurricane	Assistant director	
1935	Seven Keys to Baldpate	Assistant director	
1935	Freckles	Assistant director	
1936	Night Waitress	Assistant director	
1936	Without Orders	Assistant director	
1937	Walter Wanger's Vogues of 1938	Assistant director	
1937	Stand-In	Assistant director	
1937	52nd Street	Assistant director	
1938	Maid's Night Out	Assistant director	
1938	The Duke of West Point	Assistant director	
1938	Blockade	Assistant director	
1939	Slightly Honorable	Assistant director	
1939	Eternally Yours	Assistant director	
1939	Winter Carnival	Assistant director	
1940	The House Across the Bay	Assistant director	
1940	Li'l Abner	Screenwriter	
1942	The Shanghai Gesture	Assistant director	
1942	The Bashful Bachelor	Assistant director	
1943	Two Weeks to Live	Assistant director	
1943	Alaska Highway	Assistant director	
1946	Vacation in Reno	Screenwriter	
1946	Behind the Mask	Production manager	
1946	Don't Gamble with Strangers	Production manager	
1946	Partners in Time	Production manager	
1950	The Fireball	Assistant director	
1951	The Man with My Face	Assistant director	
1951	Fort Defiance	Assistant director	
1951	The Sound of Fury	Production manager	
1951	Queen for a Day	Production manager	
