= A Girl of the Limberlost =

A Girl of the Limberlost (novel) is the title of a 1909 novel by Gene Stratton-Porter

It may also refer to:

- A Girl of the Limberlost (1924 film), a 1924 American film directed by James Leo Meehan, based on the Stratton-Porter novel
- A Girl of the Limberlost (1934 film), a 1934 American film directed by Christy Cabanne, based on the Stratton-Porter novel
- The Girl of the Limberlost, a 1945 American film directed by Mel Ferrer, based on the Stratton-Porter novel
