= The Little Yellow House =

1928 film

- Directed by: James Leo Meehan
- Screenplay by: Dorothy Yost; Charles Kerr; Randolph Bartlett
- Based on: The Little Yellow House by Beatrice Burton Morgan
- Starring: Orville Caldwell; Martha Sleeper; Lucy Beaumont; William Orlamond; Edward Peil Jr. Freeman Wood
- Cinematography: Allen G. Siegler
- Edited by: Edward Schroeder
- Production company: Film Booking Offices of America
- Distributed by: Film Booking Offices of America
- Release date: April 18, 1928
- Running time: 62 minutes
- Country: United States
- Language: English

The Little Yellow House is a 1928 American romance film directed by James Leo Meehan and written by Dorothy Yost, Charles Kerr and Randolph Bartlett. It is based on the 1928 novel The Little Yellow House by Beatrice Burton Morgan. The film stars Orville Caldwell, Martha Sleeper, Lucy Beaumont, William Orlamond, Edward Peil Jr. and Freeman Wood. The film was released on April 18, 1928, by Film Booking Offices of America.

== Cast ==
- Orville Caldwell as Rob Hollis
- Martha Sleeper as Emmy Milburn
- Lucy Beaumont as Mrs. Milburn
- William Orlamond as Mr. Milburn
- Edward Peil Jr. as Perry Milburn
- Freeman Wood as Wells Harbison
- Edythe Chapman as Grandmother Pentland
