= Ann McKnight =

American film editor

- Born: Anna B. McKnight
- Occupation: Film editor
- Years active: 1913–1931

Ann McKnight (sometimes credited as Anna McKnight) was an American film editor active primarily during Hollywood's silent era, and has been credited as the first women to take up the profession (ahead of Viola Lawrence). She cut more than two dozen films during the mid-1910s and early 1930s, and often worked with fellow editor George Marsh.

== Biography ==
Anna started off her career working at Vitagraph in Brooklyn as an editor in 1913, making a mark early on in the medium's history. She was not credited on many of her earliest jobs. She later worked at Film Booking Offices of America; her last credit was on 1931's Smart Woman.

Little else is known about her life, but based on newspaper clippings, it seems likely that she is not the actress Ann McKnight murdered in 1930 by her husband, William Burkhardt. The two have often been conflated.

== Selected filmography ==
- Smart Woman (1931)
- The Runaround (1931)
- The Sin Ship (1931)
- Kept Husbands (1931)
- Leathernecking (1930)
- Inside the Lines (1930)
- He Knew Women (1930)
- Lovin' the Ladies (1930)
- Second Wife (1930)
- Dance Hall (1929)
- Jazz Heaven (1929)
- The Very Idea (1929)
- Street Girl (1929)
- The Red Sword (1929)
- The Jazz Age (1929)
- Hey Rube! (1928)
- Stolen Love (1928)
- Sally's Shoulders (1928)
- The Circus Kid (1928)
- Alex the Great (1928)
- All's Swell on the Ocean (1924) (short)
