= Laddie (1926 film) =

1926 film

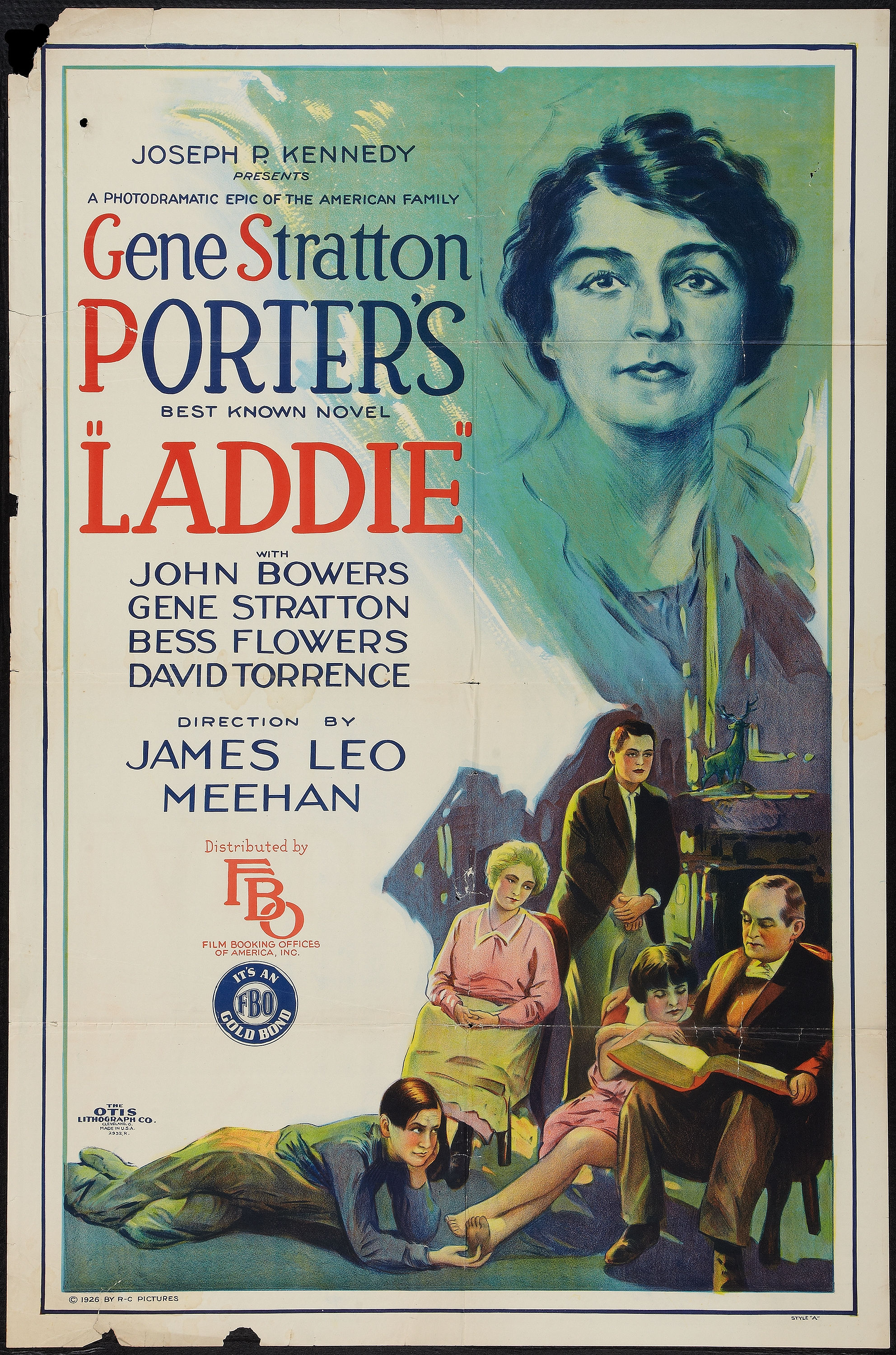
- Poster
- Directed by: James Leo Meehan assistant Charles Kerr
- Written by: Jeanette Porter Meehan
- Based on: Laddie, A True Blue Story by Gene Stratton Porter
- Produced by: Joseph P. Kennedy
- Starring: John Bowers (actor)
- Cinematography: Allen G. Siegler
- Edited by: George Hively
- Distributed by: Film Booking Offices of America
- Release date: September 26, 1926
- Country: United States
- Language: Silent (English intertitles)

Laddie is a 1926 American silent drama film directed by James Leo Meehan with John Bowers in the title role. It was based on Gene Stratton-Porter's novel, Laddie, A True Blue Story (1913).

== Plot ==
Laddie, son of the Stantons, an Ohio pioneer family, falls in love with Pamela Pryor, daughter of a neighboring aristocratic English family, though the Pryors adopt a condescending attitude toward the Stanton family. Through the efforts of Little Sister, who knows of Laddie's love, the two secretly communicate, and Mr. Pryor takes a liking to Laddie when he tames a wild horse for him. Meanwhile, Shelley, a Stanton girl, falls in love with city lawyer Robert Paget; when he leaves her under mysterious circumstances, she returns home heartbroken. The Pryors, disgraced because of a false accusation against their son in England, are at length forced to accept Laddie. It develops that Paget is actually the banished son of the Pryors; after a strained crisis Pryor forgives his son, and Laddie and Pamela, Robert and Shelley, and the Stantons and the Pryors are happily united.

== Cast ==
- John Bowers as Laddie Stanton
- Bess Flowers as Pamela Pryor
- Theodore Von Eltz as Robert Paget
- Eugenia Gilbert as Shelley Stanton
- David Torrence as Paul Stanton
- Eulalie Jensen as Mrs. Stanton
- Arthur Clayton as Mahlon Pryor
- Fanny Midgley as Mrs. Pryor
- Aggie Herring as Candace
- Gene Stratton Porter as Little Sister
- John Fox Jr. as Leon

== Production ==
The title character of Laddie is modeled after Stratton-Porter's deceased older brother, Leander, to whom she gave the nickname of Laddie. Stratton-Porter's brother drowned in the Wabash River on July 6, 1872, when he was a teenager. As in Stratton-Porter's own family, Laddie is connected with the land and identifies with Stratton-Porter's father's vocation of farming. The novel on which the film is based was published in 1913.

== Technical specifications ==
- Sound Mix - Silent
- Color - Black and White
- Aspect Ratio - 1.33 : 1
- Film Length - 1,944.65 m (7 reels)(UK), 2,112.55 m (7 reels)(USA)
- Negative Format - 35 mm
- Cinematographic Process - Spherical
- Printed Film Format - 35 mm
