= His Jazz Bride =

1926 film directed by Herman C. Raymaker

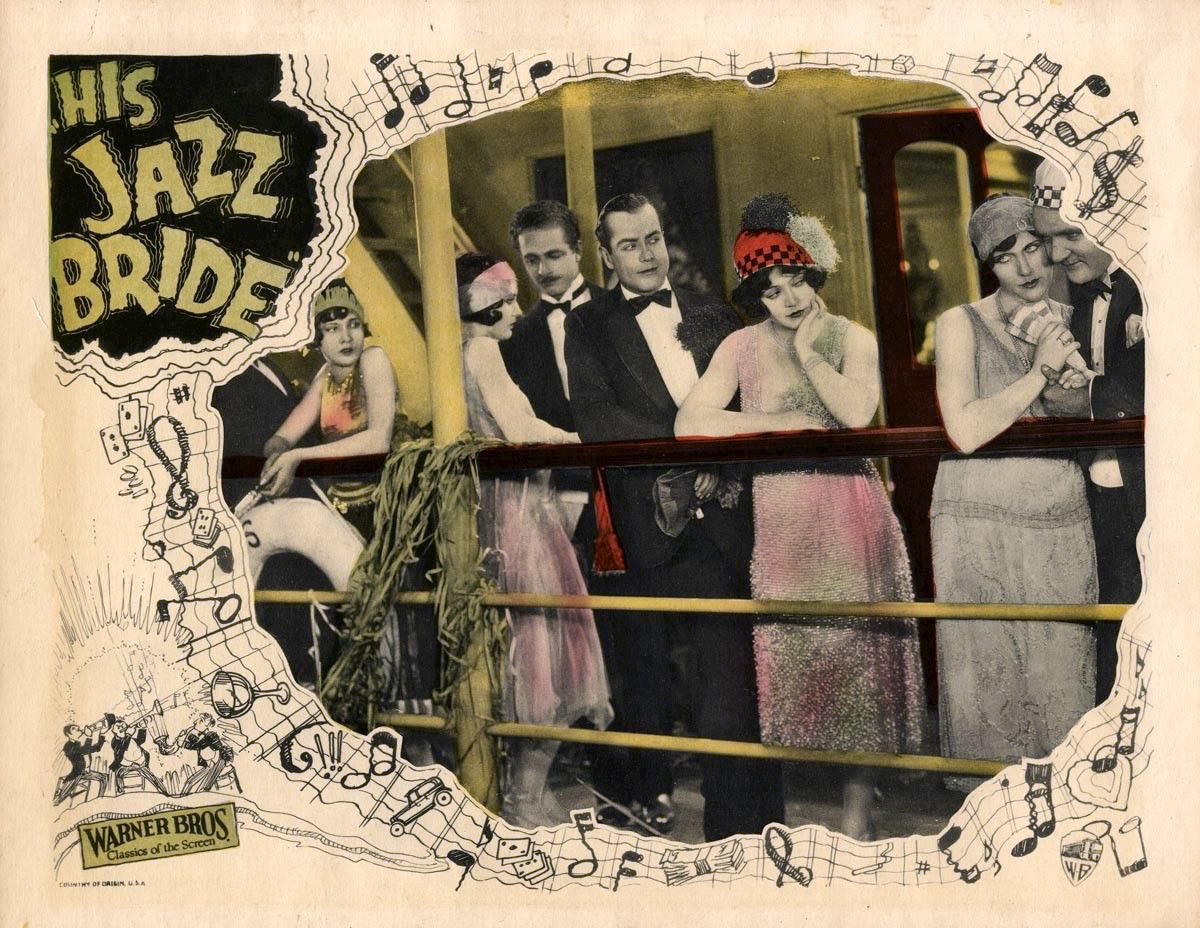
- Lobby card
- Directed by: Herman C. Raymaker
- Written by: Charles Logue; Walter Morosco
- Based on: The Flapper Wife by Beatrice Burton
- Starring: Marie Prevost; Matt Moore; Gayne Whitman
- Cinematography: David Abel
- Edited by: Clarence Kolster
- Production company: Warner Bros. Pictures
- Distributed by: Warner Bros. Pictures
- Release date: January 15, 1926; (Limited release)
- Running time: 71 minutes
- Country: United States
- Language: Silent (English intertitles)

His Jazz Bride is a 1926 American silent drama film directed by Herman C. Raymaker and starred Marie Prevost, Matt Moore, and Gayne Whitman. The film was released by Warner Bros. Pictures on January 15, 1926.

== Plot ==
As described in a film magazine review, Gloria Gregory's extravagance causes marital trouble for her husband Dick. She is influenced by a chum, May Seymour, and both are jazz-crazy, attending liquorish parties and spending lavishly. Alec Seymour accepts a bribe as an inspector and passes an unsafe steamer as being seaworthy. The boat is put into the excursion trade. Gloria is aboard the steamer on a trip attending a midnight drunken party when Dick reaches the vessel and tries to warn the captain and passengers of the danger, but he is ignored. The ship's boilers explode, and the steamer sinks while its reckless passengers continue dancing and drinking. Dick and Gloria are saved, and she promises to reform her flapper ways.

== Cast ==
- Marie Prevost as Gloria Gregory
- Matt Moore as Dick Gregory
- Gayne Whitman as Edward Martindale
- John Patrick as Stanley Wayburn
- Mabel Julienne Scott as May Seymour
- Stanley Wayburn
- Don Alvarado as Jim Carewe
- Helen Dunbar
- George Irving as Alec Seymour
- George Seddon

== Preservation ==
It is unknown if a copy of the film survives. Warner Bros. records of the film's negative have a notation, "Junked 12/27/48" (i.e., December 27, 1948). Warner Bros. destroyed many of its negatives in the late 1940s and 1950s due to nitrate film pre-1933 decomposition. Or in February 1956, Jack Warner sold the rights to all of his pre-December 1949 films to Associated Artists Productions. In 1969, UA donated 16mm prints of some Warner Bros. films from outside the United States. However, a few sources show no surviving copies, which suggests that it is a lost film.

== See also ==
- List of Warner Bros. films (1918–1929)
