= Florence Wix =

American actress

- Wix in the 1934 film, Hollywood Party
- Born: 16 May 1883; Hertfordshire, UK
- Died: 23 November 1956 (aged 73); Woodland Hills, California, United States
- Occupation: Actress
- Years active: 1924–1953

Florence Wix (16 May 1883 – 23 November 1956) was an English-born American character actress who worked from the 1920s in silent films through sound films of the 1950s.

== Biography ==
Born on 16 May 1883, in Hertfordshire in England, Wix would make her screen debut in the 1924 film Secrets, starring Betty Compson and Noah Beery. While some sources indicate that she appeared in over 100 films, the American Film Institute Database only has her listed in 48. Some of the more notable films she appeared in include: Mr. Smith Goes to Washington (1939), starring James Stewart, Jean Arthur, and Claude Rains; William Wyler's 1942 classic drama, Mrs. Miniver, starring Greer Garson and Walter Pidgeon; and 1947's comedy, The Farmer's Daughter, starring Loretta Young, Joseph Cotten, and Ethel Barrymore. Her final screen appearance would be in The Story of Three Loves (1953). Wix died on 23 November 1956 in the Woodland Hills area of Los Angeles, California, and was buried at Hollywood Forever Cemetery.

== Filmography ==
(Per AFI database)

- The Female (1924) as Lady Malete
- Secrets (1924) as Lady Lessington
- Enticement (1925) as Mrs. Kerry
- For Alimony Only (1926) as Christmas Party Guest (uncredited)
- Ladies Beware (1927) as Mrs. Ring
- Naughty Nanette (1927) as Mrs. Trainor
- The Return of Boston Blackie (1927) as Mrs. John Markham
- Beyond London Lights (1928) as Mrs. Drummond
- She Goes to War (1929) as Knitting Lady
- The Office Scandal (1929) as Party Guest (uncredited)
- Cocktail Hour (1933) as Party Guest (uncredited)
- My American Wife (1936) as Mrs. Van Dusen (uncredited)
- And Sudden Death (1936) as Miss Allenby (uncredited)
- Three Cheers for Love (1936) as Mrs. Courtney Netherland
- Mr. Deeds Goes to Town (1936) as Party Guest (uncredited)
- Gentle Julia (1936) as Aunt Fannie (uncredited)
- Yours for the Asking (1936) as Woman (uncredited)
- Wells Fargo (1937) as Pioneer Woman (uncredited)
- This Way Please (1937) (uncredited)
- Easy Living (1937) as Woman in Hat Shop (uncredited)
- The Big Broadcast of 1938 (1938) as Woman (uncredited)
- Paradise for Three (1938) as Bridge Player (uncredited)
- Romance in the Dark (1938) as Woman With Balint (uncredited)
- The Missing Guest (1938) as Linda Baldrich
- When G-Men Step In (1938) as Society Woman (uncredited)
- King of Chinatown (1939) as Nightclub Patron (uncredited)
- In Name Only (1939) as Party Guest (uncredited)
- Outside These Walls (1939) as Miss Strawbridge (uncredited)
- Mr. Smith Goes to Washington (1939) as Committeewoman (uncredited)
- The Gracie Allen Murder Case (1939) as Nightclub Patron (uncredited)
- Free and Easy (1941) as Lady Next to Lady Ridgeway (uncredited)
- Sunny (1941) as Mrs. H. Warren (uncredited)
- Unfinished Business (1941) as Woman (uncredited)
- Hi, Neighbor (1942) as Guest (uncredited)
- Mrs. Miniver (1942) as Woman with Dog (uncredited)
- Take a Letter, Darling (1942) as Nightclub Patron (uncredited)
- We Were Dancing (1942) as Sporting Woman (uncredited)
- Laugh Your Blues Away (1942) as Mrs. Jamison
- The Man from Down Under (1943) as Minister's Wife (uncredited)
- Two Girls and a Sailor (1944) as Middle-Aged Woman (uncredited)
- The Brighton Strangler (1945) as Mrs. Kent - Dorothy's Mother (uncredited)
- The Fatal Witness (1945) as Dinner Guest (uncredited)
- George White's Scandals (1945) as Nightclub Patron (uncredited)
- Those Endearing Young Charms (1945) as Customer (uncredited)
- Devotion (1946) as Englishwoman (uncredited) (credited as Flo Wix)
- The Farmer's Daughter (1947) as Party Guest (uncredited)
- Green Dolphin Street (1947) as Wife (uncredited)
- B.F.'s Daughter (1948) as Wedding Guest (uncredited)
- Hollow Triumph (1948) as Hotel Guest (uncredited)
- Please Believe Me (1950) as Guest in Dining Room (uncredited)
- The Story of Three Loves (1953) as Minor Role (segment "The Jealous Lover") (uncredited)

== Selected Television Appearances ==
- Alfred Hitchcock Presents (1956) (Season 1 Episode 35: "The Legacy") as Club Patron (uncredited)
