= Shoot Straight =

1923 film

The full film

Shoot Straight is a 1923 comedy short film directed by Jay A. Howe and produced by Hal Roach Studios. It stars James Parrott (billed as "Paul Parrott") and Jobyna Ralston.

== Plot ==
An amateur hunter attempts to kill small game using his new weapon: a rifle with a fishing reel attached. However, after his hapless attempts at pursuing squirrels, rabbits, and fowl, he is eventually chased off by a bear.
