= Victor Morgan =

American journalist and editor (1879–1946)

Victor H. Morgan
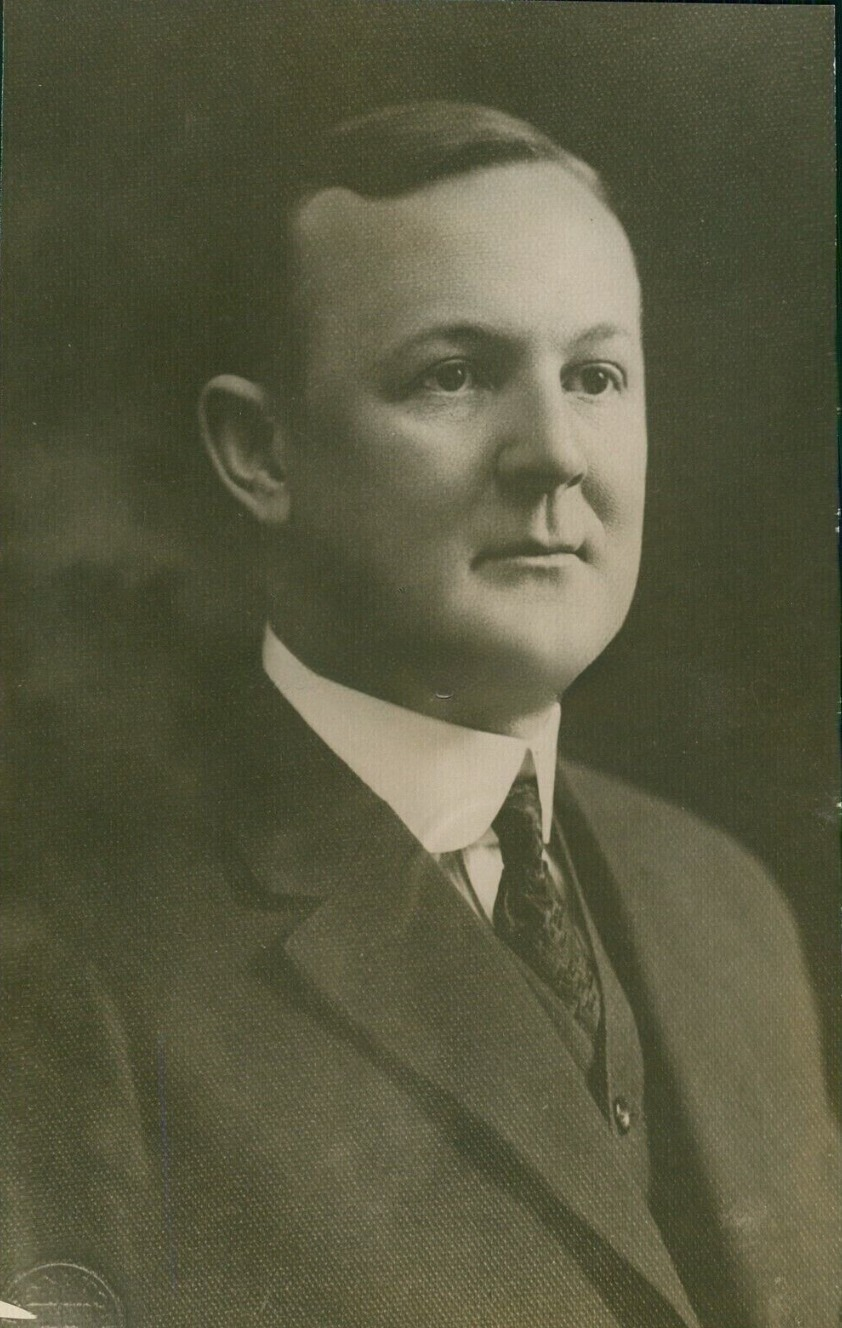
- Victor H. Morgan, editor in chief of Scripps Howard newspapers, 1917.
- Born: December 25, 1879; Massillon, Ohio, U.S.
- Died: October 2, 1946 (aged 66); Clearwater, Florida, U.S.
- Education: Cleveland Law School (now Cleveland State University College of Law), University of Marseille
- Occupations: journalist, editor, writer
- Spouse: Beatrice Burton Morgan
- Children: Virginia, Victor, and Victoria
- Parent(s): John Morgan and Anna Davies Morgan

Victor Hugo Morgan (December 25, 1879 – October 2, 1946) was an American journalist and editor for the Akron Press, Cincinnati Post and Cleveland Press; owner and editor of The Clearwater Sun; editor-in-chief for the Scripps-Howard Newspapers.

== Early life and education ==
Morgan was born in Massillon, Ohio, in the family of John Morgan, mining engineer, and Anna Davies Morgan. Morgan studied law at the Cleveland Law school. In 1902 Morgan travelled to France where he studied international law at the University of Marseilles.

== Career ==
Morgan served as U.S. vice consul in Marseilles from 1903 to 1906. After his return to the U.S., Morgan worked as editor for the Massillon Independent and stayed with the newspaper for five years.

=== Scripps Newspapers ===
After Massillon Independent, Morgan moved to Ohio and started his career with the Scripps Newspapers. He worked as an editor at the Akron Press, Cincinnati Post (editor in 1914–1915, replaced Harry Brown), Cleveland Press (editor in 1915–1921).

=== War correspondent ===
During the First World War, Morgan served as a war correspondent for the Scripps newspapers. A series of Morgans' accounts of conditions in France and Germany were published in the Cleveland Press. He was assigned to the American front in France during 1917–1918. In Europe Morgan was accompanied by his wife Beatrice Burton Morgan. Burton Morgan also worked as a journalist and was recognised as 'an accomplished newspaper woman'. For instance, Burton Morgan reported on the conditions and innovations of French cooking during the war.

Morgan's reports on Germany were not positive. He stated that the Germans did not deny their war atrocities that were blamed on them because they wanted them to be publicised.

In May 1918, after returning from Europe, Morgan delivered a speech titled "Journalism Over There" at the University of Missouri's annual journalism week. He emphasised the critical role of American journalism in winning the war by countering German propaganda and promoting pro-war measures. Morgan highlighted that the French public had become immune to Germany's insidious propaganda. He lamented the strict and sometimes unreasonable censorship imposed on war correspondents, which prevented them from providing the American people with comprehensive news coverage. He found it absurd that American citizens often received news about the American front from German sources.

=== Scripps-Howard Newspapers ===
In March 1921 Morgan was appointed editor-in-chief of the Ohio group of the Scripps-McRae Newspapers (from 1922 renamed as the Scripps-Howard Newspapers) and stayed with the company until 1928.

=== The Clearwater Sun ===
After 17 years with the Scripps-Howard Newspapers, Morgan moved to Florida. The decision to relocate to Florida with his family was caused by his health. In 1928 Morgan purchased The Clearwater Sun and became its editor.

== Personal life ==
Morgan married writer and actress Beatrice Burton on November 8, 1916. Between 1918 and 1922 they had three children: Virginia, Victor, and Victoria.

== Death ==
After a few years of illness, Morgan died in Morton Plant Hospital in Clearwater, Florida on October 2, 1946.
