= Beatrice Burton =

American writer (1894–1983)

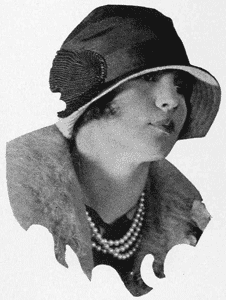
- Born: May 13, 1894; Cleveland Ohio, U.S.
- Died: April 13, 1983 (aged 88); Naples, Florida, U.S.
- Other name: Beatrice Burton Morgan
- Occupations: Author, playwright
- Spouse: Victor Morgan
- Children: Virginia, Victor, and Victoria

Beatrice Burton (1894–1983), also known as Beatrice Burton Morgan, was a writer of popular fiction active in the early decades of the 20th century. Burton also had a short career as an actress and later became a newspaper editor with her husband, Victor Morgan.

== Career ==
Beatrice wanted to be an actress and had even signed a contract with David Belasco in 1909, but little work came her way. One of her most significant roles came in 1922 when she played Mrs. Reed in The Cradle Buster.

As a second resort, she began to write at the impressive rate of as many as four books a year. Burton's romance stories were first serialized in newspapers with great success before Grosset and Dunlap published them in low-cost hard-cover editions.

As her books made their way to Hollywood, Burton's name became entwined with 1920s pop culture. Her romance stories, which all take place during the year they were written, provide a glimpse into the culture of the '20s. Many famous actors, films, and figures are mentioned during the stories. Also used is the inventive '20s slang.

In her time, Burton was known as a woman's author. Donald Willard writes in the Boston Globe from 1927 that Beatrice Burton is among the favorites of young female stenographers, "innocent of the world and starry-eyed." He implies the books read by such women have little literary value. Even so, Burton's serials and novels were distributed and read widely, giving her productions "a ready made audience in every city and town throughout the country."

Burton's writing, and the films adapted from them, were distributed by the Hearst Circulation. The Hearst Media Corporation was a powerful media group that controlled several newspapers, radio stations, and Cosmopolitan Pictures. The circulation was responsible for the advertisement of movies like Sally’s Shoulders. Burton's brother Harry connected Beatrice to the corporation: The Hearst Corporation acquired Cosmopolitan in 1905, where Harry worked as an editor.

== Life and death ==
Beatrice Burton was born on May 13, 1894, in Cleveland, Ohio. She lived with her father Alfred (a newspaper editor), mother Minnie, and siblings Harry and Audley. She attended college for two years. She came from a family of newspaper editors and reporters, and she listed herself as "reporter" in the Cleveland city directory. Her brother, Harry, would go on to be a journalist and editor for Cosmopolitan.

Beatrice married Victor Hugo Morgan on November 8, 1916, in Cuyahoga County, Ohio. Morgan was the editor of The Cleveland Press. Sometime between 1920 and 1930, she and her family moved to Florida, where Victor was editor of a local newspaper in Clearwater. Beatrice divided her time between writing books and magazine articles, assisting her husband with editing the newspaper, and raising their three children, who were born in 1917, 1921 and 1922.

She died on April 13, 1983, in Naples, Florida.

== Known books ==
- The Flapper Wife (1925)
- Her Man (1926)
- Footloose (1926)
- Love Bound (1926)
- Sally's Shoulders (1927)
- The Hollywood Girl (1927)
- The Petter (1927)
- Honey Lou or The Love Wrecker (1927)
- The Little Yellow House (1928)
- Money Love (1928)
- Lovejoy (1930)
- Easy (1930)
- Mary Faith (1931)
- Girl in the Family (1932)
- The Flapper's Daughter (1933)
- The Mainspring (1936)
- Little Town (1937)

== Filmic adaptations ==
- A Transplanted Prairie Flower (1914)
- Footloose Widows (1926)
- His Jazz Bride (1926) (aka The Flapper Wife)
- Sally's Shoulders (1928)
- The Little Yellow House (1928)
- Beyond London Lights (1928)
