= Robert McBride (composer) =

American composer and instrumentalist (1911–2007)

Robert McBride (February 20, 1911 – July 1, 2007) was an American composer and instrumentalist.

== Life ==
McBride was born in Tucson, Arizona, and learned from an early age to play clarinet, oboe, saxophone and the piano. He studied composition with Otto Luening at the University of Arizona, receiving a Bachelor of Music degree in 1933, and a Master of Music in 1935. From 1935 until 1946 he taught at Bennington College, where he met and married his wife, Carol. He then moved to New York City, where he worked briefly as a commercial composer and arranger, at first for Triumph Films, producing scores for Farewell to Yesterday (1950), The Man with My Face (1951), Garden of Eden (1954), and a number of short subjects. As television began to supplant short subjects at the movies, in 1957 he joined the faculty of his alma mater, the University of Arizona, where he taught until 1976.

By the mid-1990s he had developed an ear disorder that caused him to hear pitches a half-step off, and so he was unable to listen to music at all.

== Style ==
His music, often with catchy titles, ranged from the serious to the whimsical: ballets, jazz pieces, instrumental solos, chamber pieces, and orchestral works.

== Discography ==
- 1934. Mexican Rhapsody. Boston Promenade Orchestra; Arthur Fiedler, cond.
- 1935. Fugato on a Well-Known Theme. Boston Promenade Orchestra; Arthur Fiedler, cond.
- 1937. Warm-up for English horn alone (decidedly alone). Robert McBride, English horn.
- 1937. Let down for English horn with piano. Robert McBride, English horn; Paul Creston, piano.
- 1939. Quintet for Oboe and Strings. Robert McBride, oboe; Coolidge Quartet.
- 1939. Swing Stuff. Robert McBride, clarinet; Boston Promenade Orchestra; Arthur Fiedler, cond.
- 1939. Jingle-Jangle. Lawrence White, vibraphone; Boston Promenade Orchestra; Arthur Fiedler, cond.
- 1940. Wise-apple Five, for clarinet and strings. Robert McBride, clarinet; soloists.
- 1947. Aria and Toccata in Swing for Violin and Orchestra. Louis Kaufman, violin; Columbia Symphony Orchestra; Bernard Herrmann, cond.
- 1947. Aria and Toccata in Swing (arr. by Louis Kaufman). Louis Kaufman, violin; Annette Kaufman, piano.
- 1953. Concerto for Violin and Orchestra. Maurice Wilk, violin; American Recording Society Orchestra; Walter Hendl, cond.
- 1957. Mexican Rhapsody. On Fiesta in Hi-Fi. LP recording, 1 disc: 12 in., stereo. Olympian Series. Mercury MG 50134. Eastman-Rochester Orchestra; Howard Hanson, cond. Recorded May 6, 1956, Eastman Theatre, Rochester, N.Y. Reissued 1960 on LP, Mercury SR 90134. Reissued 1992 on CD, Mercury 434 324-2.
- 1958. Pumpkin Eater's Little Fugue. New Symphony Orchestra of London; Salvatore Camarata, cond.
- 1958. Workout for 15 Instruments. New Symphony Orchestra of London; Salvatore Camarata, cond.
- 1968. Panorama of Mexico. Polish National Radio Orchestra; Ladzistan Szostak, cond.
- 1969. March of the Be-Bops. On Music for Orchestra. LP recording, 1 disc: 12 in., stereo. Composers Recordings CRI 228 USD. Polish National Radio Orchestra; Ladzistan Szostak, cond.
