= Orville Caldwell =

American actor

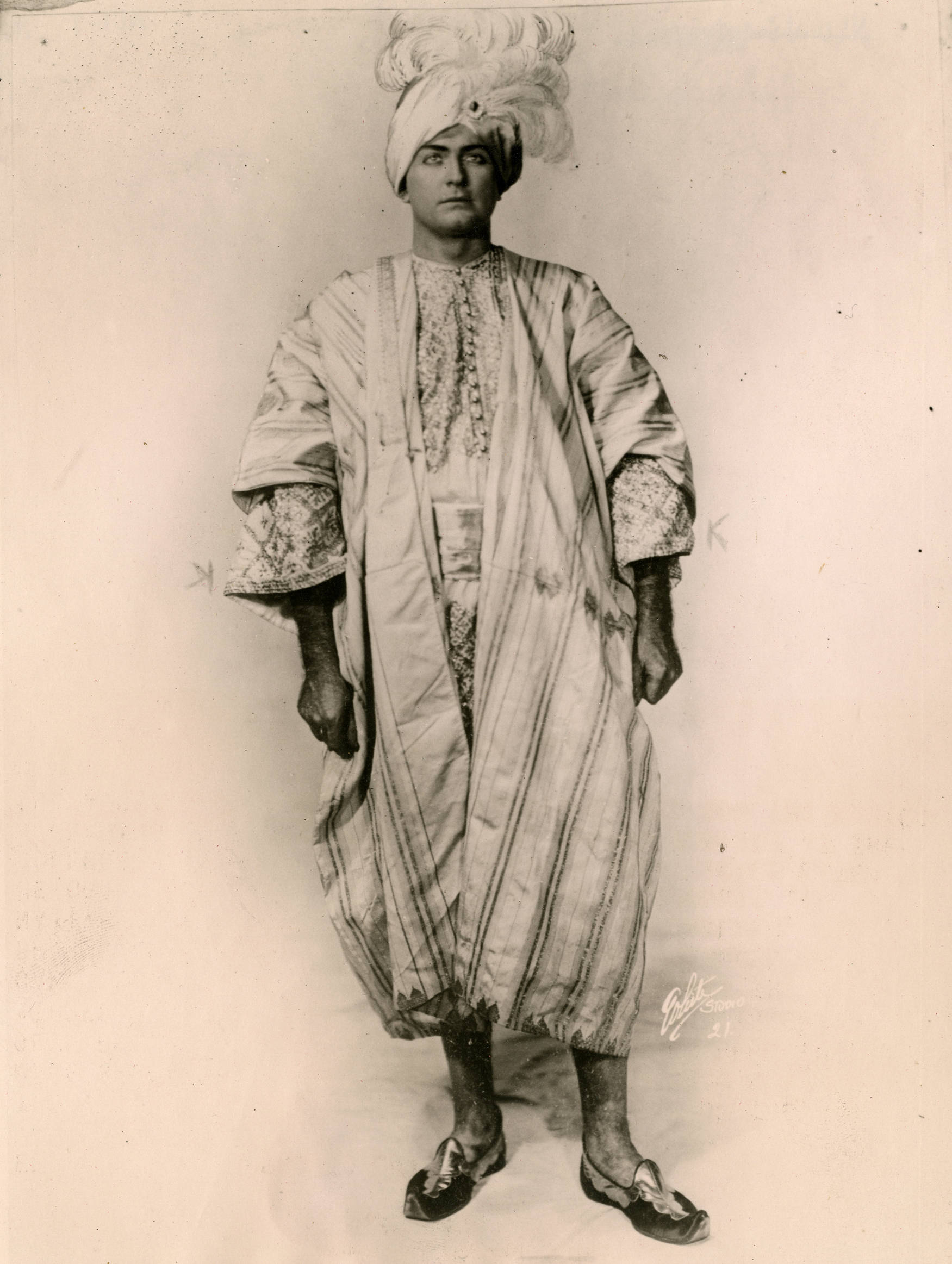
- Caldwell in 1922
- Born: Orville Robert Caldwell; February 8, 1896; Oakland, California, U.S.
- Died: September 24, 1967 (aged 71); Santa Rosa, California, U.S.
- Occupation(s): Actor, politician
- Years active: 1923–1938, 1942-1951
- Spouse: Audrey Anderson (m. 1917-1967)

Orville Caldwell (February 8, 1896–September 24, 1967) was an American actor of the stage and screen and a politician later in life.

== Film ==
Caldwell appeared in 21 films between 1923 and 1938, but was inactive for 7 years starting in 1928 during the transition from silent film to sound film. He is best known for his role as Tony in The Patsy (1928) costarring with Marion Davies. Most of his starring roles are lost today, and most of his talking roles were uncredited.

Following his departure from film, Caldwell transitioned to politics, serving from 1942 to 1951 as the first deputy mayor of Los Angeles.

== Politics ==
Caldwell served as Deputy Mayor of Los Angeles from 1942 to 1951.

In response to an influx of migration of African Americans to Los Angeles during the Second World War, Caldwell proposed a ban on African American immigration into California.

== Filmography ==
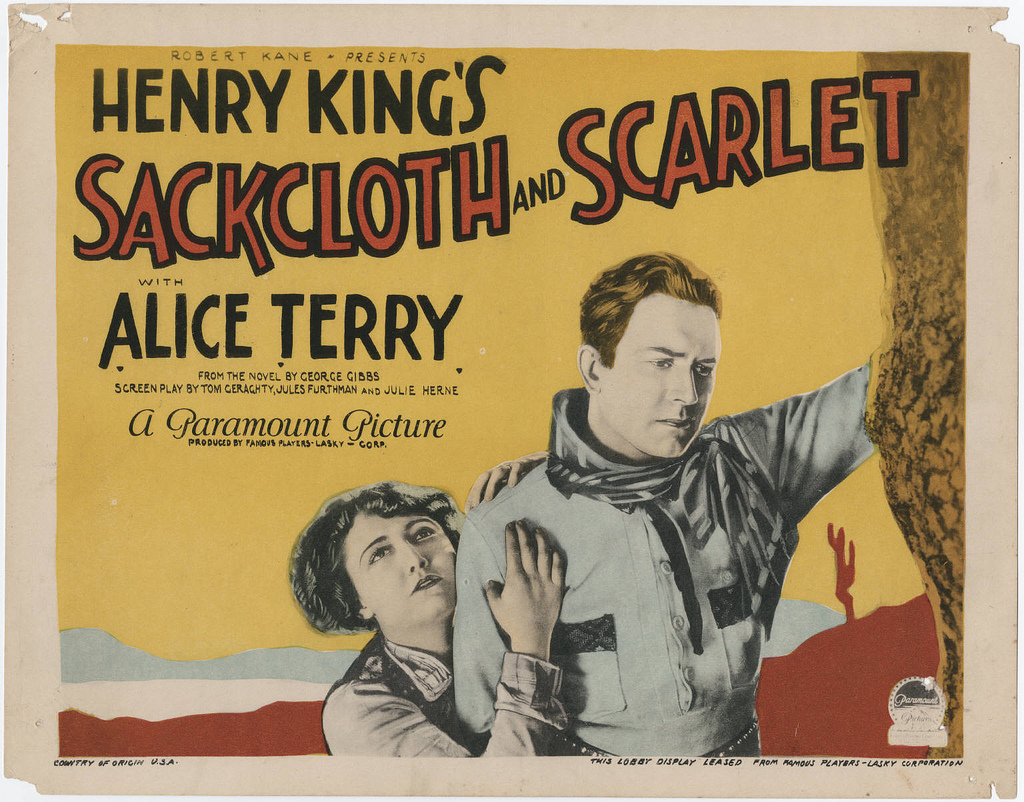
Lobby card for Sackcloth and Scarlet (1925)

=== Silent films ===
Year	Title	Role	Notes
1923	The Lonely Road	Warren Wade	Lost film
1923	The Scarlet Lily	Lawson Dean	Lost film
1923	The French Doll	Wellington Wick	
1923	The Six-Fifty	Dan Taylor	Lost film
1924	Daughters of the Night	Billy Roberts	Lost film
1925	Sackcloth and Scarlet	Stephen Edwards	Lost film
1926	The Wives of the Prophet	Howard Brice	Lost film
1926	Flame of the Argentine	Dan Prescott	Lost film
1927	Judgment of the Hills	Brant Dennison	Lost film
1927	The Harvester	David Langston	Lost film
1928	The Little Yellow House	Rob Hollis	Lost film
1928	The Patsy	Tony Anderson	

=== Sound films ===
Year	Title	Role	Notes
1935	His Family Tree	Julius - Mayor's Henchman	
1935	Three Kids and a Queen	Detective	uncredited
1937	She's No Lady	Inspector	uncredited
1937	Big City	Comet Cab Driver	uncredited
1937	The Last Gangster	Guard	uncredited
1937	Mannequin	Stage Manager	uncredited
1938	Boys Town	Warden	uncredited
1938	Just Around the Corner	Henshaw Assistant	uncredited
1938	The Last Warning	Inspector Wilson	
