= The Harvester (1927 film) =

1927 film

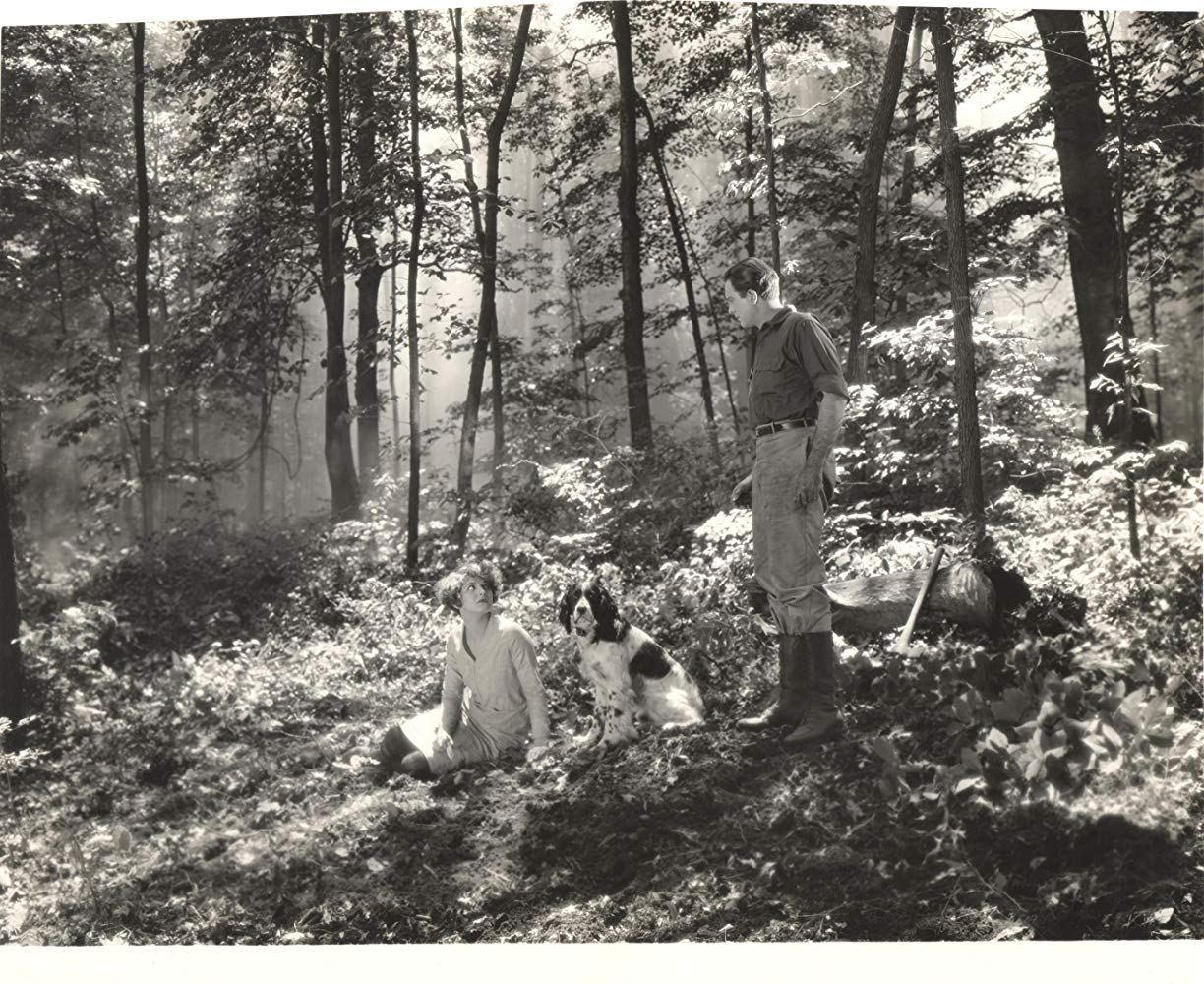
- Directed by: James Leo Meehan
- Written by: Gene Stratton-Porter (novel); Jeanette Porter Meehan; Dorothy Yost
- Produced by: Joseph P. Kennedy
- Starring: Orville Caldwell; Natalie Kingston; Will Walling
- Cinematography: Allen G. Siegler
- Production company: Film Booking Offices of America
- Distributed by: Film Booking Offices of America; Ideal Films (UK)
- Release date: November 7, 1927
- Running time: 8 reels
- Country: United States
- Languages: Silent; English intertitles

The Harvester is a 1927 American silent comedy film directed by James Leo Meehan and starring Orville Caldwell, Natalie Kingston and Will Walling. It is an adaptation of the 1911 novel of the same name by Gene Stratton-Porter, which was later remade as a sound film in 1936.

== Cast ==
- Orville Caldwell as David Langston
- Natalie Kingston as Ruth
- Will Walling as Henry Jamison
- Jay Hunt as Dr. Carey
- Lola Todd as Nurse
- Edward Hearn as Dr. Harmon
- Fanny Midgley as Granny Moreland

== Bibliography ==
- Munden, Kenneth White. The American Film Institute Catalog of Motion Pictures Produced in the United States, Part 1. University of California Press, 1997.
