= Flame of the Argentine =

1926 film

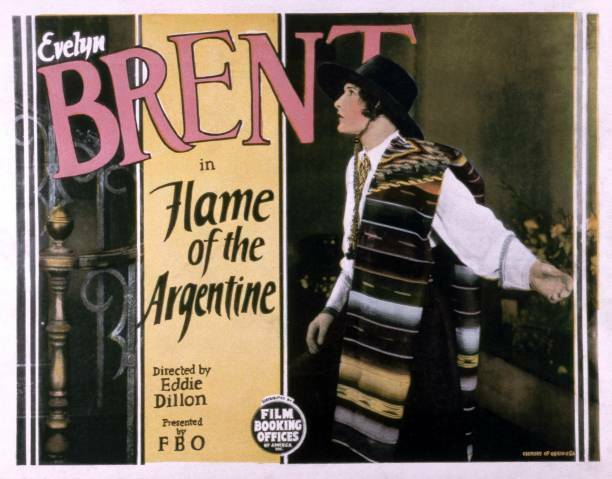
- Directed by: Edward Dillon
- Written by: Ewart Adamson; Burke Jenkins; Krag Johnson
- Starring: Evelyn Brent; Orville Caldwell; Frank Leigh
- Cinematography: Roy H. Klaffki
- Production company: Robertson-Cole Pictures Corporation
- Distributed by: Film Booking Offices of America; Ideal Films (UK)
- Release date: July 11, 1926
- Running time: 50 minutes
- Country: United States
- Languages: Silent; English intertitles

Flame of the Argentine is a 1926 American silent action film directed by Edward Dillon and starring Evelyn Brent, Orville Caldwell and Frank Leigh. It was produced by Film Booking Offices of America, and was released in Britain by Ideal Films. It is now considered a lost film.

== Synopsis ==
Doña Aguila owns a large ranch and a valuable emerald mine in Argentina, but her estate manager Emilio Tovar is trying to swindle her. On a visit to New Orleans, he persuades cabaret performer Inez Remírez to pose as Aguila's long-lost daughter. She returns with him and Doña Aguila it taken in by her, but Remírez is shamed by the older woman's kindness and refuses to help Tovar. He threatens her but she is rescued by American insurance agent Dan Prescott.

== Cast ==
- Evelyn Brent as Inez Remírez
- Orville Caldwell as Dan Prescott
- Frank Leigh as Emilio Tovar
- Daniel Makarenko as Marsini
- Rosita Marstini as Madame Marsini
- Evelyn Selbie as Nana
- Florence Turner as Doña Aguila

== Bibliography ==
- Lynn Kear & James King. Evelyn Brent: The Life and Films of Hollywood's Lady Crook. McFarland, 2009.
