= The Magic Garden (1927 film) =

1927 American silent film

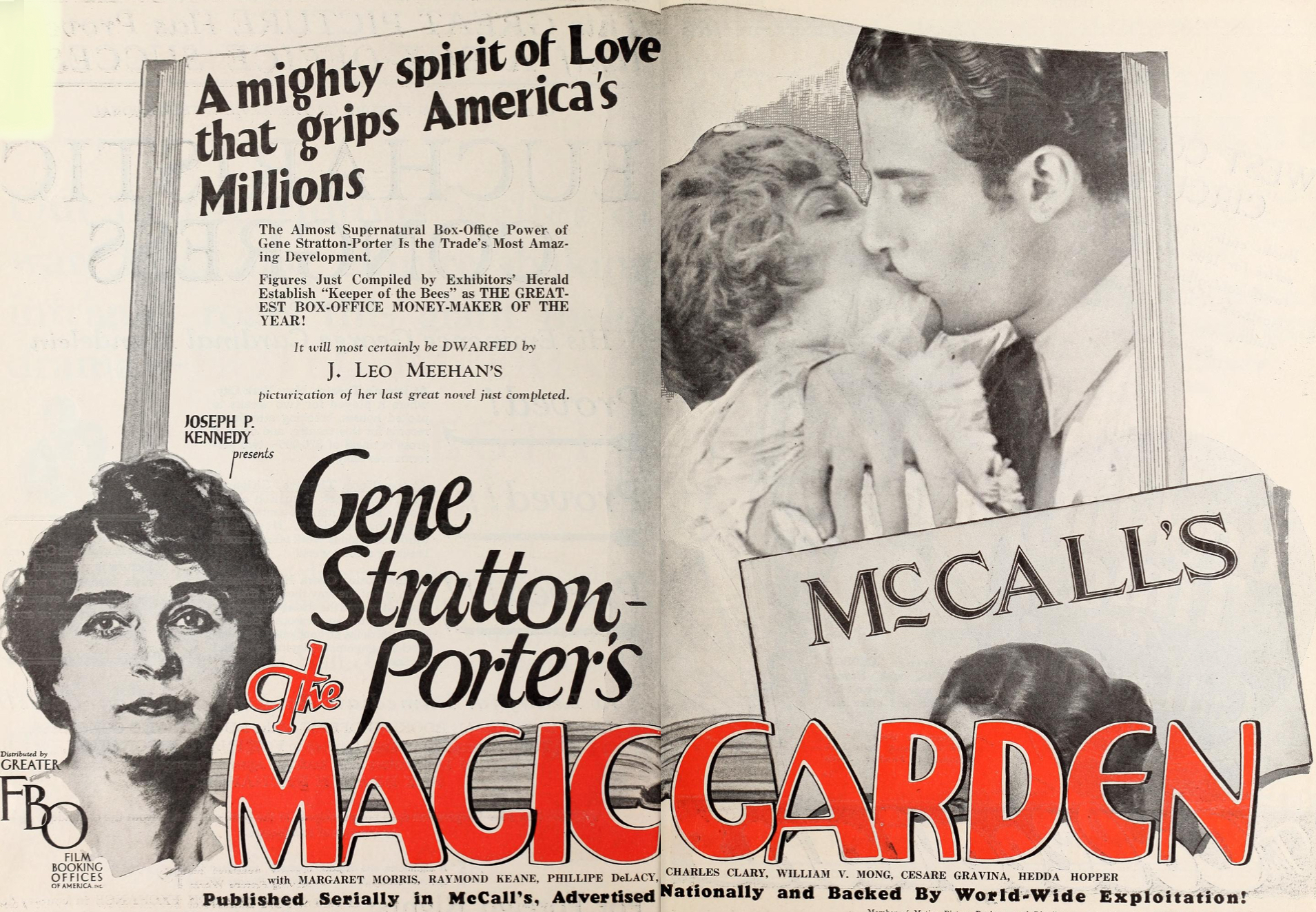
- Advertisement
- Directed by: James Leo Meehan
- Written by: Charles Kerr; James Leo Meehan
- Based on: The Magic Garden by Gene Stratton-Porter
- Produced by: Joseph P. Kennedy
- Starring: Joyce Coad; Margaret Morris; Philippe De Lacy
- Cinematography: Allen G. Siegler
- Production company: Gene Stratton Porter Productions
- Distributed by: Film Booking Offices of America; Ideal Films (UK)
- Release date: June 30, 1927
- Running time: 70 minutes
- Country: United States
- Language: Silent (English intertitles)

The Magic Garden is a 1927 American silent drama film directed by James Leo Meehan and starring Joyce Coad, Margaret Morris, and Philippe De Lacy. The film's sets were designed by the art director Carroll Clark. It is an adaptation of the novel of the same by Gene Stratton-Porter.

== Plot ==
Amaryllis, a rich and spoiled girl, is sent to live in the countryside with her uncle. There, she befriends a crippled neighbor of her age, John. Redeemed by her compassion towards him, she and John are allowed to enter a "magic garden", which only they can see.

== Cast ==
- Joyce Coad as Amaryllis Minton, as a child
- Margaret Morris as Amaryllis Minton, as an adult
- Philippe De Lacy as John Guido Forrester, as a child
- Raymond Keane as John Guido, as an adult
- Charles Clary as Paul Minton
- William V. Mong as John Forrester
- Cesare Gravina as Maestro
- Paulette Duval as Countess di Varesi
- Walter Wilkinson as Peter Minton, as a child
- Earl McCarthy as Peter Minton, as an adult
- Alfred Allen as Chief Clare
- Kathrin Clare Ward as Mrs. O'Rourke
- Ruth Cherrington as Duenna

== Preservation ==
With no prints of The Magic Garden located in any film archives, the film is considered lost.

== Bibliography ==
- Munden, Kenneth White. The American Film Institute Catalog of Motion Pictures Produced in the United States, Part 1. University of California Press, 1997.
