= The Toilers (1928 film) =

1928 film by Reginald Barker

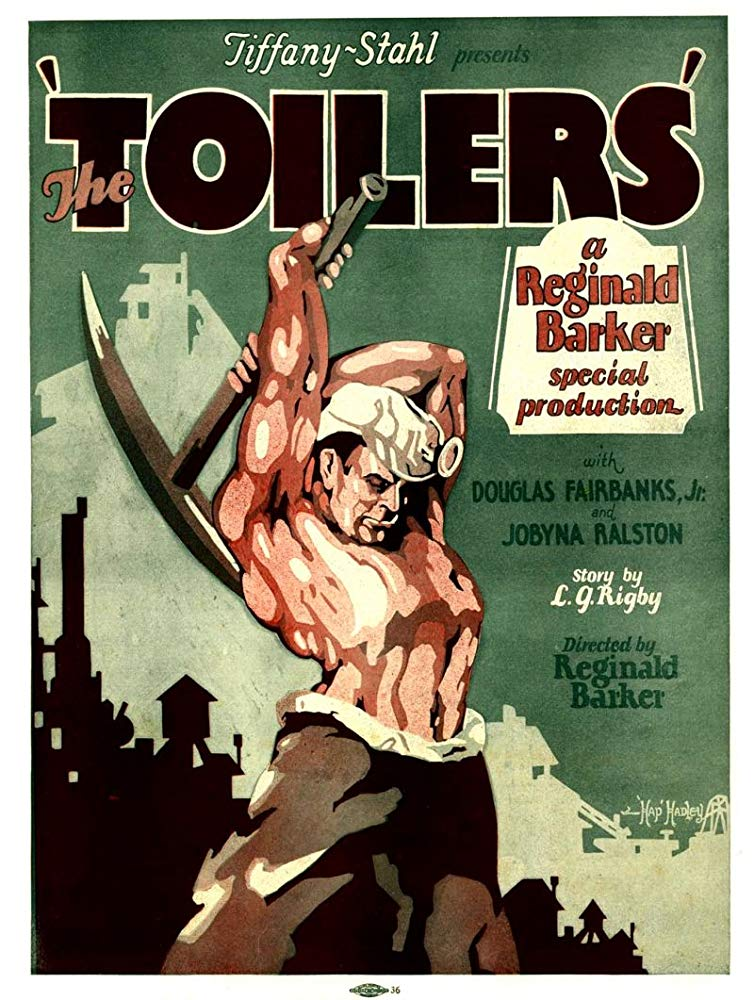
- Directed by: Reginald Barker
- Written by: Gordon Rigby (screenplay); Harry Braxton (titles)
- Story by: Gordon Rigby
- Produced by: John M. Stahl
- Starring: Douglas Fairbanks Jr. Jobyna Ralston
- Production company: Tiffany-Stahl Productions
- Release date: October 1, 1928
- Running time: 80 minutes
- Country: United States
- Languages: Sound (Synchronized) (English intertitles)

The Toilers is a 1928 American synchronized sound drama film starring Douglas Fairbanks Jr. and Jobyna Ralston and directed by Reginald Barker. While the film has no audible dialog, it was released with a synchronized musical score with sound effects using both the sound-on-disc and sound-on-film process. The soundtrack was recorded using the Tiffany-Tone process using RCA Photophone equipment. The film is important historically as being Tiffany's first sound feature. In the film, Fairbanks plays one of the toilers (coal miners), while Ralston plays his sweetheart.

== Plot ==
Seven hundred feet underground, Steve (Douglas Fairbanks Jr.), Joe (Harvey Clark), and Toby (Wade Boteler) work in dangerous conditions, bringing coal to the surface for a world that barely acknowledges them. Despite their hardship, they find moments of camaraderie, such as celebrating Christmas together, albeit with cynicism: "Christmas is a great old day... a hole in your bankbook... a pain in your stomach."

Across the tracks, Mary (Jobyna Ralston), a young woman taken from an orphanage under false pretenses, is abandoned and left to fend for herself. While wandering alone in the cold, she is chased by a man and stumbles upon the miners around a fire. Terrified, she runs into the night and is eventually found by Steve.

Steve brings the wet and frightened Mary back to his place. Despite her fear, he assures her, “I’m not gonna hurt you—I just want to take off your wet clothes.” He offers her pajamas and a place to sleep. Mary, with no place to go, confesses her story, and Steve insists she stay the night in one of the three beds in the house.

The next morning, Toby and Joe return home drunk and are surprised to learn there's a girl staying with them. They joke about Steve being drunker than them both. Eventually, Mary becomes part of the household, bringing warmth and order to their gritty lives. She makes breakfast and tries to bring a touch of domesticity to the chaotic bachelor home.

Steve is awkwardly falling for Mary but struggles with expressing it. Joe and Toby, realizing Mary’s prolonged stay might be becoming too permanent, draw lots to decide who should tell her to leave—Steve loses, but clearly doesn’t want her gone.

Steve, overwhelmed by his growing feelings and the pressures of life, gets drunk while doing Christmas shopping. He stumbles home, delivered by a miner named Butch (Robert Ryan), and shamefully apologizes to Mary: "I made a li'l girl cry... and I’m shorry." He then gifts her a present—a dress—symbolizing his desire to bring her happiness.

Butch, however, is not as kind as he seemed. When Mary visits his butcher shop, he makes unwanted advances and offers her a dog “for a kiss.” When she rejects him, he attempts to assault her. Mary escapes and runs back into the street, traumatized.

The plot reaches its climax when a catastrophic mine disaster traps Steve, Toby, and others underground. Flames, gas, and cave-ins block all escape routes. Inside, the men struggle with despair and suffocation. Steve says goodbye to Mary in his thoughts, while Joe, who remains above, is desperate for action.

Mary refuses to give up hope, insisting she saw Toby alive. Finally, distant sounds of drills reignite hope—rescuers are on the way. The group inside, nearly suffocated and hopeless, rally as drills break through the rock wall and bring salvation.

Steve and the other miners are rescued. Emotions are raw but hopeful. Joe remarks, “Life is fine—and beautiful,” admitting his earlier pessimism was wrong. Steve proposes marriage to Mary, and the film ends on a note of redemption, love, and hard-won survival, as the toilers of the earth rise again to find meaning and joy.

== Cast ==
- Douglas Fairbanks Jr. as Steve
- Jobyna Ralston as Mary
- Harvey Clark as Joe
- Wade Boteler as Toby
- Robert Ryan

== Preservation status ==
- Copies of the film are held by several archives i.e., George Eastman Museum, BFI National Film and Television, Library of Congress, New Zealand Film Archive.

== See also ==
- List of early sound feature films (1926–1929)
