= Sackcloth and Scarlet =

1925 film

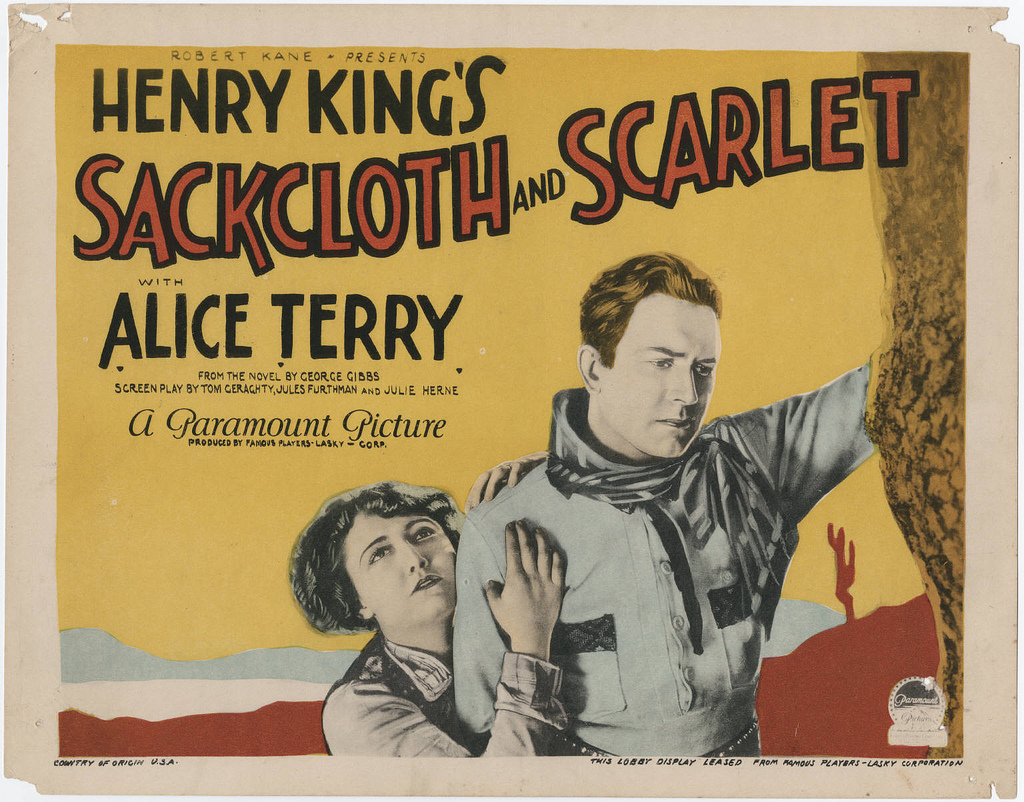
- Theatrical release poster
- Directed by: Henry King
- Screenplay by: Jules Furthman; Thomas J. Geraghty; George Fort Gibbs; Julie Herne
- Produced by: Henry King
- Starring: Alice Terry; Orville Caldwell; Dorothy Sebastian; Otto Matieson; Kathleen Kirkham; John Miljan
- Cinematography: Robert Kurrle; William Schurr
- Production company: Kagor Productions
- Distributed by: Paramount Pictures
- Release date: March 22, 1925
- Running time: 70 minutes
- Country: United States
- Language: Silent (English intertitles)

Sackcloth and Scarlet is a 1925 American silent drama film directed by Henry King and written by Jules Furthman, Thomas J. Geraghty, George Fort Gibbs and Julie Herne. The film stars Alice Terry, Orville Caldwell, Dorothy Sebastian, Otto Matieson, Kathleen Kirkham, and John Miljan. The film was released on March 22, 1925, by Paramount Pictures.

== Cast ==
- Alice Terry as Joan Freeman
- Orville Caldwell as Stephen Edwards
- Dorothy Sebastian as Polly Freeman
- Otto Matieson as Etienne Fochard
- Kathleen Kirkham as Beatrice Selignac
- John Miljan as Samuel Curtis
- Clarissa Selwynne as Miss Curtis
- Jack Huff as Jack

== Preservation ==
In February of 2021, Sackcloth and Scarlet was cited by the National Film Preservation Board on their Lost U.S. Silent Feature Films list and is therefore presumed lost.
