= The Count of Ten =

1928 film

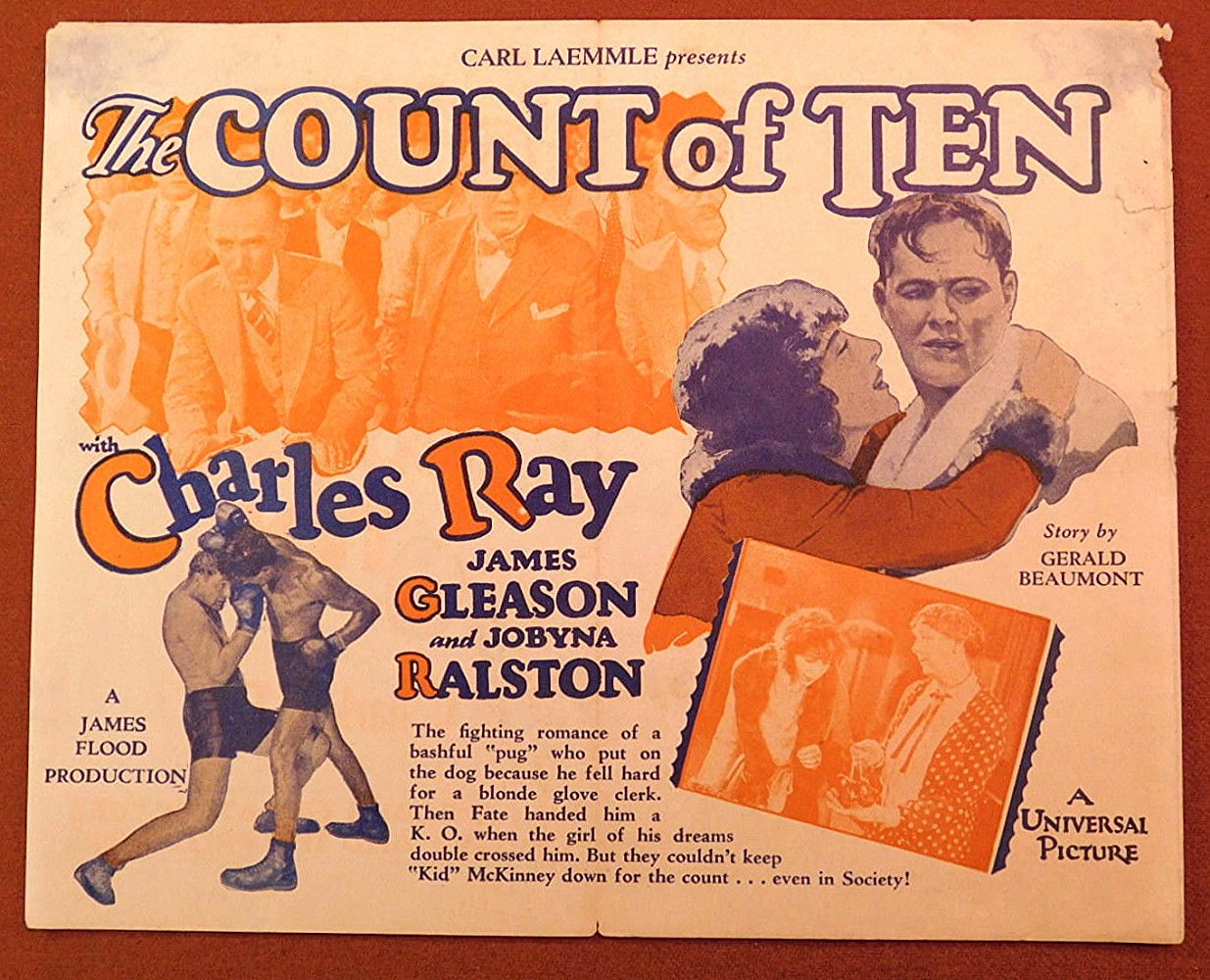
- Directed by: James Flood
- Written by: Albert DeMond; Harry O. Hoyt
- Based on: "Betty’s a Lady" by Gerald Beaumont
- Starring: Charles Ray; James Gleason; Jobyna Ralston
- Cinematography: Benjamin H. Kline; Virgil Miller
- Edited by: George McGuire
- Production company: Universal Pictures
- Distributed by: Universal Pictures
- Release date: March 10, 1928
- Running time: 60 minutes
- Country: United States
- Language: Silent (English intertitles)

The Count of Ten is a 1928 American silent sports drama film directed by James Flood and starring Charles Ray, James Gleason, and Jobyna Ralston.

== Plot ==
As described in a film magazine, Johnny McKinney is a rising, young prize-fighter whose aim is to become the middle-weight championship of the world. Jimmie, his manager, takes him to Chicago to arrange a championship fight when Johnny falls in love with Betty, a glove clerk in a department store and marries her. Her father and brother move in with them and live off the money which Johnny earns. Betty, with more money than she has ever had as a clerk, spends it lavishly and soon gets her husband into debt. In a charity bout, Johnny breaks a bone in his hand and has to lay off fighting. At the same time, Betty's brother asks her for $7,000 to cover a gambling debt. Betty refuses and, when Johnny finds her in tears, he is told by the brother that she is expecting a little stranger and needs the money for hospital bills. Johnny rushes to Jimmie asking to borrow $7,000 but refuses to say what it is for. The manager refuses him, saying he will not be made a leech of by Betty's family. The fighter breaks with him and challenges the champion in order to get the money. Arthur, the brother, manages him. Johnny loses the fight as he is unable to use his right hand and Jimmie, sitting in the audience, cannot watch Johnny's punishment or the mistakes of Arthur who is in Johnny's corner. He throws in a towel as an admission of defeat. The fighter, broken physically and mentally, will not see his wife as he realizes that her family have brought him to his present position. Jimmie, who has been most bitter against them, brings about a reconciliation between the fighter and his wife, and the brother and father are ordered from the house.

== Cast ==
- Charles Ray as Johnny McKinney
- James Gleason as Jimmie, Johnny's Manager
- Jobyna Ralston as Betty McKinney
- Edythe Chapman as Mother McKinney
- Arthur Lake as Betty's Brother
- Charles Sellon as Betty's Father
- George Magrill as Cleaver
- Jackie Combs as Baby McKinney

== Preservation ==
With no prints of The Count of Ten located in any film archives, it is a lost film.

== Bibliography ==
- Goble, Alan. The Complete Index to Literary Sources in Film. Walter de Gruyter, 1999.
