= The Red Sword =

1929 film

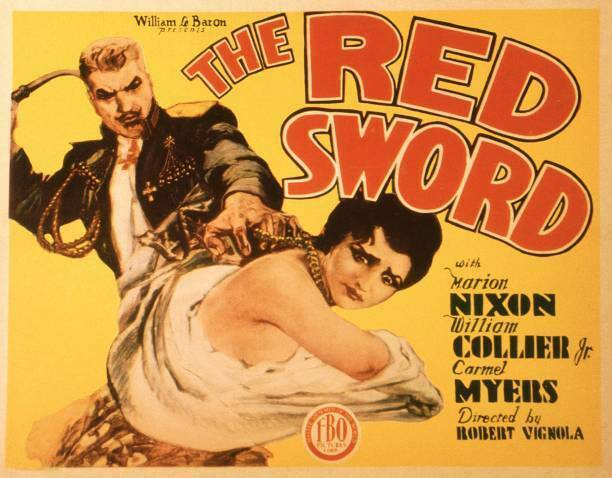
- Directed by: Robert G. Vignola
- Written by: Randolph Bartlett; Wyndham Gittens; Stanner E.V. Taylor
- Starring: William Collier Jr. Marian Nixon; Carmel Myers
- Cinematography: Nicholas Musuraca
- Edited by: Ann McKnight
- Production company: Film Booking Offices of America
- Distributed by: Film Booking Offices of America
- Release date: February 17, 1929
- Running time: 70 minutes
- Country: United States
- Languages: Silent; English intertitles

The Red Sword is a 1929 American silent adventure film directed by Robert G. Vignola and starring William Collier Jr., Marian Nixon and Carmel Myers. The film was produced and distributed by FBO Pictures, shortly before it was taken over by RKO Pictures. It was released in Britain by Ideal Films under the alternative title Three Days to Live.

== Synopsis ==
In Tsarist Russia, a Cossack general Litovski rapes the wife of an innkeeper leading to her death. Years later the innkeeper's daughter Vera seeks revenge on the general, even though she is in love with his nephew.

== Cast ==
- William Collier Jr. as Paul
- Marian Nixon as Vera
- Carmel Myers as Katherine
- Demetrius Alexis as Veronoff
- Alan Roscoe as Litovski
- Charles Darvas as Fideleff
- Barbara Bozoky as Cook

== Preservation ==
The film is now lost.

== Bibliography ==
- Rainey, Buck. Sweethearts of the Sage: Biographies and Filmographies of 258 actresses appearing in Western movies. McFarland & Company, 1992.
