= Siberia (1926 film) =

1926 film directed by Victor Schertzinger

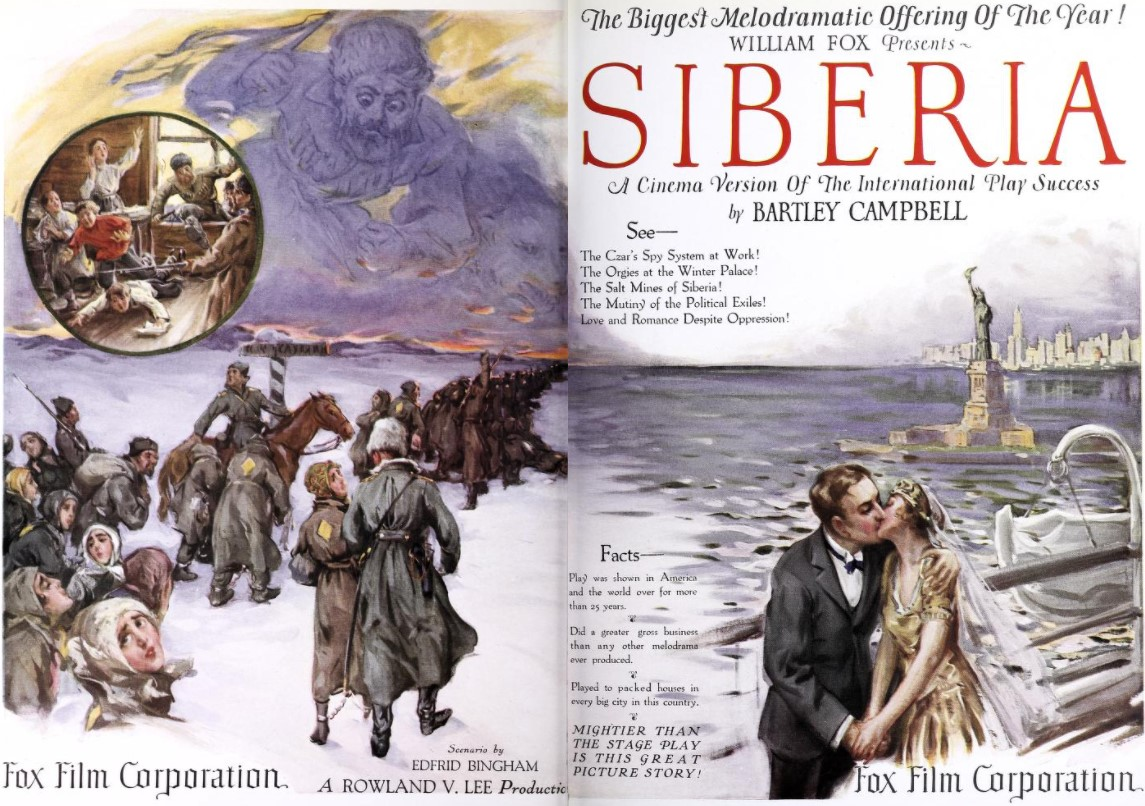
- Advertisement
- Directed by: Victor Schertzinger; William Tummel (ass't director)
- Written by: Eve Unsell
- Produced by: William Fox
- Starring: Alma Rubens; Edmund Lowe; Tom Santschi
- Cinematography: Glen MacWilliams; Robert Martin
- Production company: Fox Film Corporation
- Distributed by: Fox Film Corporation
- Release date: March 28, 1926
- Running time: 7 reels, 6,950 feet
- Country: United States
- Language: Silent (English intertitles)

Siberia is a lost 1926 American silent drama film directed by Victor Schertzinger and starring Alma Rubens, Edmund Lowe, and Tom Santschi. It was produced and distributed by Fox Film Corporation. Made on a relatively high budget of around $250,000, it was considered a disappointment and barely made back its costs.

== Plot ==
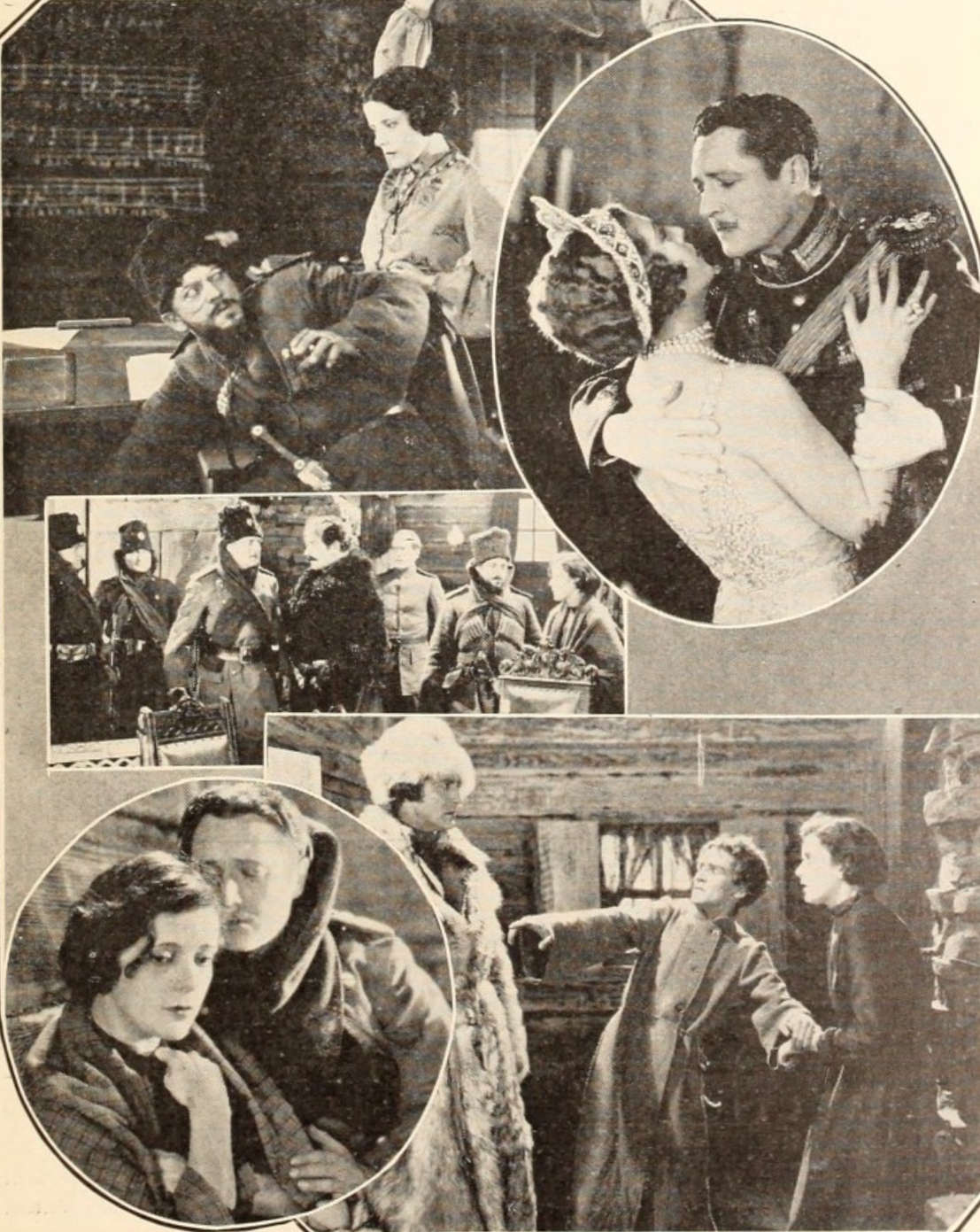
Film stills from advertisement in the April 24, 1926 issue of Motion Picture News

The Imperial Russian Army officer Leonid Petroff and the pro-revolutionary schoolteacher Sonia Vronsky fall in love. She is exiled to Siberia with her brother Kyrill, but Petroff is posted there and they continue their romance. After the October Revolution Vronsky and Petroff escape the country while being pursued by the Bolshevik leader Egor Kaplan.

== Cast ==
- Alma Rubens as Sonia Vronsky
- Edmund Lowe as Leonid Petroff
- Lou Tellegen as Egor Kaplan
- Tom Santschi as Alexis Vetkin
- Paul Panzer as Commandant
- Vadim Uraneff as Kyrill Vronsky
- Lilyan Tashman as Beautiful blonde
- Helena D'Algy as Beautiful brunette
- James A. Marcus as Andrei Vronsky
- Daniel Makarenko as Governor
- Harry Gripp as Ivan the Nameless
- Sammy Blum as Feodor

== Preservation ==
With no prints of Siberia in any film archives, it is a lost film.

== See also ==
- 1937 Fox vault fire

== Bibliography ==
- Solomon, Aubrey. The Fox Film Corporation, 1915-1935: A History and Filmography. McFarland, 2011.
