= Vadim Uraneff =

Russian actor

- Born: Вадим Уранёв; 6 February 1895; St. Petersburg, Russian Empire
- Died: 5 April 1952 (aged 57); Duarte, California, United States
- Occupations: Actor, librettist, mime and theater critic

Vadim Uraneff (6 February 1895 – 5 April 1952) was a Russian actor and librettist who helped John Barrymore and Katharine Hepburn when it was hoped they would appear in The Song of Solomon.

He was also a mime who played Lucianus in Hamlet in the Ballet Russe. As theater critic, he explained in 1923:

The [vaudeville] actor works with the idea of an immediate response from the audience: and with regard to its demands. By cutting out everything -every line, gesture, movement- to which the audience does not react and by improvising new thins, he establishes unusual unity between the audience and himself... Stylization in gesture, pose, misen-scène and make-up follows as a result of long experiment before the primitive spectator whose power as judge is absolute.

He translated the lyric drama Star (The) Woman from Russian alongside P. Colum.

He directed the theatre drama Anathema by L. N. Andreev at the Apollo Theater, New York.

He is buried at the Hollywood Forever Cemetery.

== Filmography ==
- I Believed in You (1934) as Xandy vendor
- Friends and Lovers (1931) as Ivanoff
- The Medicine Man (1930) as Gus
- Midnight Madness (1928) as Joe
- Fazil (1928) as Ahmed.
- Once and Forever (1927) as Axel
- Little Mickey Grogan (1927) as Crooked
- The Magic Flame (1927) as the visitor.
- The Flame of the Yukon (1926) as Solo Jim
- Siberia (1926) as Kyrill Vronsky
- The Blonde Saint (1926) as Nino
- The Silent Power (1926) as Jerry Spencer
- The Sea Beast (1926) as Pip
