= Samuel W. Taylor =

American novelist (1907–1997)

- Born: Samuel Woolley Taylor; February 5, 1907; Provo, Utah, U.S.
- Died: September 26, 1997 (aged 90)
- Occupations: Novelist; scriptwriter; historian
- Spouse: Gay Dimick
- Relatives: John W. Taylor (father); Janet Maria Woolley (mother); John Taylor (paternal grandfather); Sara Weston (Daughter); Patrick Weston (Grandson); Elizabeth Weston (Granddaughter); Aisling Weston (Great Granddaughter) Adeline Weston (Great Granddaughter) Reed Hyland (Adopted Grandson)

Samuel Woolley Taylor (February 5, 1907 – September 26, 1997) was an American novelist, scriptwriter, and historian.

He is best known for the short story "A Situation of Gravity" in the May 22, 1943 issue of Liberty magazine. This story was adapted to film and television several times. The first version was The Walt Disney Company movie The Absent-Minded Professor (1961), followed by the theatrical sequel, Son of Flubber (1963), and two made-for-TV legacy sequels starring Harry Anderson, The Absent-Minded Professor (1988) and The Absent-Minded Professor: Trading Places (1989). The 1997 film Flubber starring Robin Williams is a remake of the first film. Taylor also wrote several novels and non-fiction works, some of which touch on Latter-day Saint themes.

== Biography ==
Taylor was born in Provo, Utah to Janet "Nettie" Maria Woolley and John W. Taylor, the son of John Taylor, president of the Church of Jesus Christ of Latter-day Saints (LDS Church) from 1880 to 1887. Samuel's father was a former member of the church's Quorum of the Twelve Apostles, having left in 1905 in protest over the church's Second Manifesto abandonment of polygamy the previous year. Despite his father's ecclesiastical history and excommunication in 1911, Samuel was raised in the LDS Church. He later wrote a biography of his father called Family Kingdom, and one of his grandfather titled The Kingdom or Nothing.

In the late 1920s Taylor attended Brigham Young University (BYU), studying journalism. He became editor of the student newspaper Y News, in which he also wrote a weekly column called "Taylored Topics." After covering a story about rum-running on campus, Taylor was questioned by school administration to divulge his sources, but he refused. After a temporary suspension, he returned to his previous position with the paper, and returned to upsetting administration with his writing. After six suspensions, he later recalled that he could "take a hint" and dropped out of BYU. By then he had already published five articles in nationally distributed magazines. He decided to "escape" Utah and followed Gay Dimick, a fellow BYU student, back to her native California. They married there in 1934 and established their longtime home in Redwood City.

He served as an officer in the United States Army Air Forces public relations office in the European theatre of World War II.

He was awarded an honorary lifetime membership by the Association for Mormon Letters at the 1994 AML Awards.

== Writings ==
=== Film scripts and adaptations ===
In 1942, the first film based on one of Taylor's stories, The Man Who Returned to Life, was released. This was later followed in 1951 by The Man with My Face based on his novel of the same name.

His first foray into screenwriting began with Bait in 1954.

In contrast to the serious nature of these films, Taylor was also the author of two short stories, published in Liberty weekly magazine, on which the Disney movies The Absent-Minded Professor (1961), Son of Flubber (1963), The Absent-Minded Professor (1988), The Absent-Minded Professor: Trading Places (1989) and Flubber (1997) were based. "A Situation of Gravity" was reprinted in the 1996 collection Take My Advice, Mr. President!

He is sometimes incorrectly credited as the writer of Alfred Hitchcock's 1958 film Vertigo, though that screenplay was actually written by Samuel A. Taylor.

=== General novels ===
Those novels not dealing specifically with Mormonism:

- The Grinning Gismo, A. a. Wyn Inc, 1951.
- The Man with My Face, 1948
- Take My Advice, Mr. President, Taylor Trust, 1996, ISBN 1-56684-344-8. (A collection of his Liberty magazine short stories, including "A Situation of Gravity")
- Uranium Fever, with Raymond Taylor, Macmillan Company, 1970

=== Latter-day Saint works ===
Biography and history

- Family Kingdom, New York: McGraw-Hill Book Co., 1951, ISBN 0-914740-14-8.
- I Have Six Wives, New York: Greenberg, 1956. (based on the life of Rulon C. Allred)
- Vineyard by the Bay, San Mateo, 1968. (uncredited; history of the LDS Church in the San Francisco Bay Area)
- Nightfall at Nauvoo (Nauvoo House and Nauvoo Temple), New York: Macmillan, 1971 ISBN 0-380-00247-7.
- The Kingdom or Nothing, New York: Macmillan, 1976, ISBN 0026166003.
  (republished as The Last Pioneer, Signature Books, 1999, ISBN 1-56085-115-5)
- Rocky Mountain Empire, New York: Macmillan, 1978, ISBN 0026166100.
- The John Taylor Papers (2 vols.), Redwood City, Cal: Taylor Trust, 1984.
- Taylor-made Tales, Murray, Utah: Aspen Books, 1994, ISBN 1-56236-216-X.
  (autobiography)

Humorous fiction

- Heaven Knows Why!, New York: A.A. Wyn, 1948.
  Mormon comedy set in Utah, originally published as serials in Collier's magazine under the title "The Mysterious Way". Has been called the funniest piece of fiction written on Mormon culture.

==== Criticism ====
Taylor was an early proponent of a Mormon literature in essays such as "Peculiar People, Positive Thinkers and the Prospects of Mormon Literature" (Dialogue, 1967) and "Little Did She Realize: Writing for the Mormon Market" (Dialogue, 1969), wherein he decried the current state of the literature and called for greater artistry and realism. Taylor continued to publish criticism related to Mormon culture in Dialogue as well as Sunstone magazine.

== Sources ==
- Cracroft, Richard H. (Fall 2001), "Samuel Wooley Taylor: Maverick Mormon Historian", Journal of Mormon History, 27 (2): 64–91, archived from the original on 2011-06-14.
- Paulson, Jean R. (Summer 1999), "Samuel W. Taylor: Talented Native Son", Utah Historical Quarterly, 67 (3): 265–284, doi:10.2307/45062501, JSTOR 45062501, S2CID 254432984, archived from the original on 2011-06-14.
- Peterson, Levi S. (August 1998), "In Memoriam: Samuel W. Taylor" (PDF), Sunstone (111): 11.
- Taylor, Gay (Summer 1991), "Why Am I Here?", Dialogue: A Journal of Mormon Thought, 24 (2): 93–103, doi:10.2307/45227757, JSTOR 45227757, S2CID 254338469.
- Taylor, Samuel W. (1994), Taylor-Made Tales, Salt Lake City: Aspen Books, ISBN 1-5623-621-6-X.
