= The Wives of the Prophet =

- Directed by: James A. Fitzgerald
- Written by: Opie Read (novel)
- Starring: Orville Caldwell; Alice Lake; Violet Mersereau
- Cinematography: Larry Williams
- Production company: J.A. Fitzgerald Productions
- Distributed by: Lee-Bradford Corporation
- Release date: January 1926
- Running time: 70 minutes
- Country: United States
- Language: Silent (English intertitles)

The Wives of the Prophet is a 1926 American silent drama film directed by James A. Fitzgerald and starring Orville Caldwell, Alice Lake, and Violet Mersereau.

== Plot ==
As described in a film magazine review, a religious sect in the Tennessee mountains expect the arrival of a prophet for whom five young women have been selected to be his wives. Howard, a young lawyer, accidentally witnesses their annual ritual, makes a sketch of Judith, one of the designated five young women, which is then reproduced as a tattoo on his chest. He is declared by the elders to be the Prophet and united to Judith and the other four women in a ritual in a huge cave. Of these, Alma has a sweetheart, Warner Richmond. Later, after avoiding moonshiners and their whiskey still and other adventures, he escapes to the outside world with Judith.

== Cast ==
- Orville Caldwell as Howard Brice
- Alice Lake as Judith
- Violet Mersereau as Alma
- Harlan Knight as The Patriarch
- Ruth Stonehouse as Rachael
- Warner Richmond as Ben Blake
- Maurice Costello as William Neil
- Edward Roseman as Boyle
- Mary Thurman as Laura Neil

== Bibliography ==
- Donald W. McCaffrey & Christopher P. Jacobs. Guide to the Silent Years of American Cinema. Greenwood Publishing, 1999. ISBN 0-313-30345-2
