= Friends and Lovers (1931 film) =

1931 film by Victor Schertzinger

- Theatrical poster for the film
- Directed by: Victor Schertzinger
- Written by: Wallace Smith (adaptation); Jane Murfin
- Based on: Le sphinx a parlé 1930 novel by Maurice Dekobra
- Produced by: William LeBaron
- Starring: Lili Damita; Adolphe Menjou; Laurence Olivier; Erich von Stroheim
- Cinematography: J. Roy Hunt
- Edited by: William Hamilton
- Music by: Victor Schertzinger; Max Steiner
- Distributed by: RKO Radio Pictures
- Release date: October 3, 1931
- Running time: 68 minutes
- Country: United States
- Language: English

Friends and Lovers is a 1931 American pre-Code drama film released by RKO Radio Pictures, directed by Victor Schertzinger, and starring Adolphe Menjou, Lili Damita, Laurence Olivier, Erich von Stroheim, and Hugh Herbert.

The film recorded a loss of $260,000.

== Plot ==
British Army captain Geoff Roberts carries on an affair with Alva, the beautiful wife of the cruel Victor Sangrito. Sangrito, however, is well aware of the affair: his wife seduces men with his approval, in order that he can blackmail them.

When Roberts falls into Sangrito's trap, he pays the blackmail and leaves for India, hoping to forget Alva, whom he loved but now believes betrayed him. After some time in India, he is joined by his young friend and bosom companion Lt. Ned Nichols. Nichols, too, is in love with a woman back in England—the same woman.

Although the two friends nearly come to blows over Alva, they eventually realize that she has been false to them both and that their friendship far outweighs their feelings for a mendacious woman. However, when the two are invalided home, they encounter Alva again, and learn that she may not have betrayed them after all.

== Cast ==
- Adolphe Menjou as Captain Geoffrey Roberts
- Lili Damita as Alva Sangrito
- Laurence Olivier as Lieutenant Ned Nichols
- Erich von Stroheim as Colonel Victor Sangrito
- Hugh Herbert as McNellis
- Frederick Kerr as General Thomas Armstrong
- Blanche Friderici as Lady Alice
- Jean Del Val as Marquis Henri De Pezanne
- Vadim Uraneff as Ivanoff
