= Sally's Shoulders =

1928 film

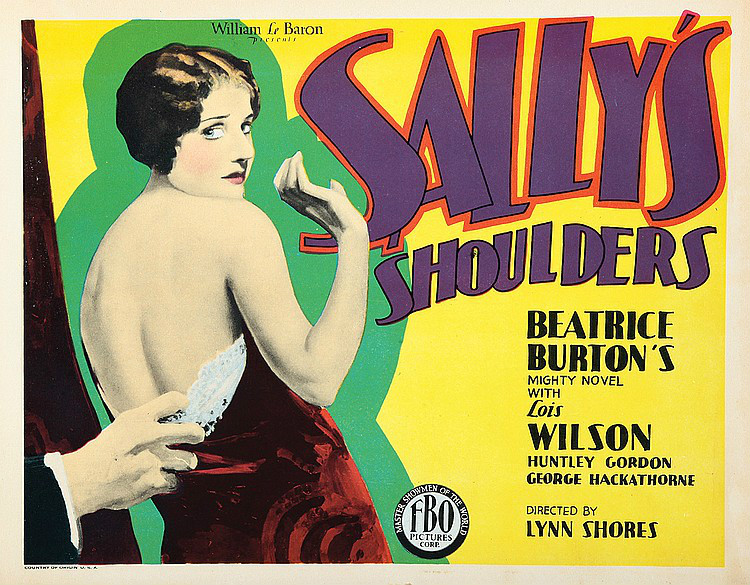
- Directed by: Lynn Shores
- Screenplay by: Lynn Shores; Randolph Bartlett
- Based on: Sally's Shoulders by Beatrice Burton
- Starring: Lois Wilson; George Hackathorne; Huntley Gordon; Lucille Williams; Edythe Chapman; Ione Holmes
- Cinematography: Virgil Miller
- Edited by: Archie Marshek; Ann McKnight
- Production company: Film Booking Offices of America
- Distributed by: Film Booking Offices of America
- Release date: October 14, 1928
- Running time: 65 minutes
- Country: United States
- Language: English

Sally's Shoulders is a 1928 American drama film directed by Lynn Shores and written by Lynn Shores and Randolph Bartlett. It is based on the 1927 novel Sally's Shoulders by Beatrice Burton. The film stars Lois Wilson, George Hackathorne, Huntley Gordon, Lucille Williams, Edythe Chapman and Ione Holmes. The film was released on October 14, 1928, by Film Booking Offices of America.

== Cast ==
- Lois Wilson as Sally
- George Hackathorne as Beau
- Huntley Gordon as Hugh Davidson
- Lucille Williams as Millie
- Edythe Chapman as Emily
- Ione Holmes as Mabel
- Charles O'Malley as Billy
- William Marion as Sheriff

== Preservation ==
No prints are known to exists which makes it currently a lost film.
