= Jobyna Ralston =

American actress (1899–1967)

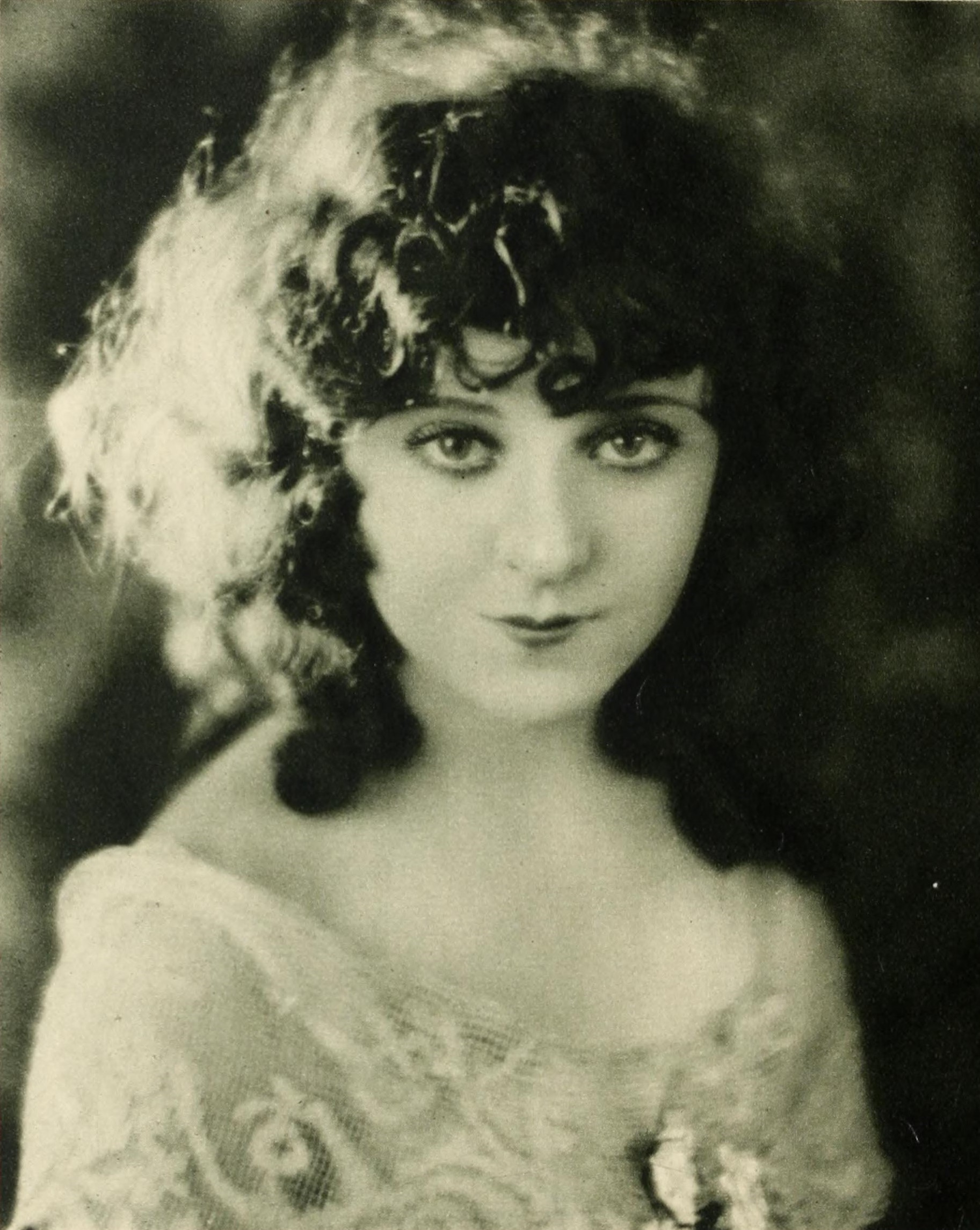
- Ralston in 1924 issue of Stars of the Photoplay
- Born: Jobyna Lancaster Raulston; November 21, 1899; South Pittsburg, Tennessee, U.S.
- Died: January 22, 1967 (aged 67); Woodland Hills, California, U.S.
- Years active: 1919–1931
- Spouses: John Campbell (m. 1917, divorced) Richard Arlen (m. 1927; div. 1946)
- Children: 1

Jobyna Ralston (born Jobyna Lancaster Raulston, November 21, 1899 – January 22, 1967) was an American stage and film actress. She had a featured role in Wings in 1927, and is remembered for her on-screen chemistry with Harold Lloyd, with whom she appeared in seven films.

== Early life and career ==
Ralston was born in South Pittsburg, Tennessee, on November 21, 1899, to Joseph Lancaster Raulston and Sarah E. Kemp Raulston. She was named after Jobyna Howland. She had a younger brother, Edward Angus (born 1905). Ralston's mother, a portrait photographer, carefully groomed her daughter for a show business career.

At the age of 9, she gave her first stage performance as Cinderella during the grand opening of the Wilson theatre/Opera House in 1909. Around 1915, Ralston attended acting school in New York. She later danced chorus and sang in Broadway productions, her first being Two Little Girls in Blue. This production marked her Broadway debut, when she was 21. Comedian Max Linder saw her on stage and persuaded her to go to Hollywood, where she appeared in a number of his films. She also co-starred in Humor Risk (1921), the fabled lost comedy short film that was to be the film debut of the Marx Brothers. Soon director Hal Roach began to feature her in one-reel comedies. She abandoned the stage for the screen in 1922 when her mother's health began to decline, and she needed to make more money to help pay the medical bills.

=== Starring with Harold Lloyd ===
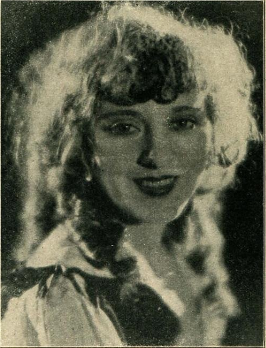
Ralston in 1923

In 1923, Ralston was named by the film industry as one of the WAMPAS Baby Stars. This award was given every year to the top up and coming female stars. That same year she starred with silent comedian Harold Lloyd in Why Worry?, and over the next five years she appeared in six more of Lloyd's feature films as his leading lady. Ralston is remembered for these performances and her onscreen chemistry with Lloyd.

=== Silent film career ===
As a freelance actress, Ralston co-starred with Richard Arlen in the first Oscar-winning film, Wings (1927). She had a feature role in the film, which also featured Clara Bow, Gary Cooper, and Buddy Rogers. She starred in 11 more motion pictures, among them Special Delivery (1927) co-starring Eddie Cantor. Her film career ended after two early sound movies when she became a mother. Her last talkie, Rough Waters (1930), found her acting with Rin Tin Tin.

== Personal life and death ==
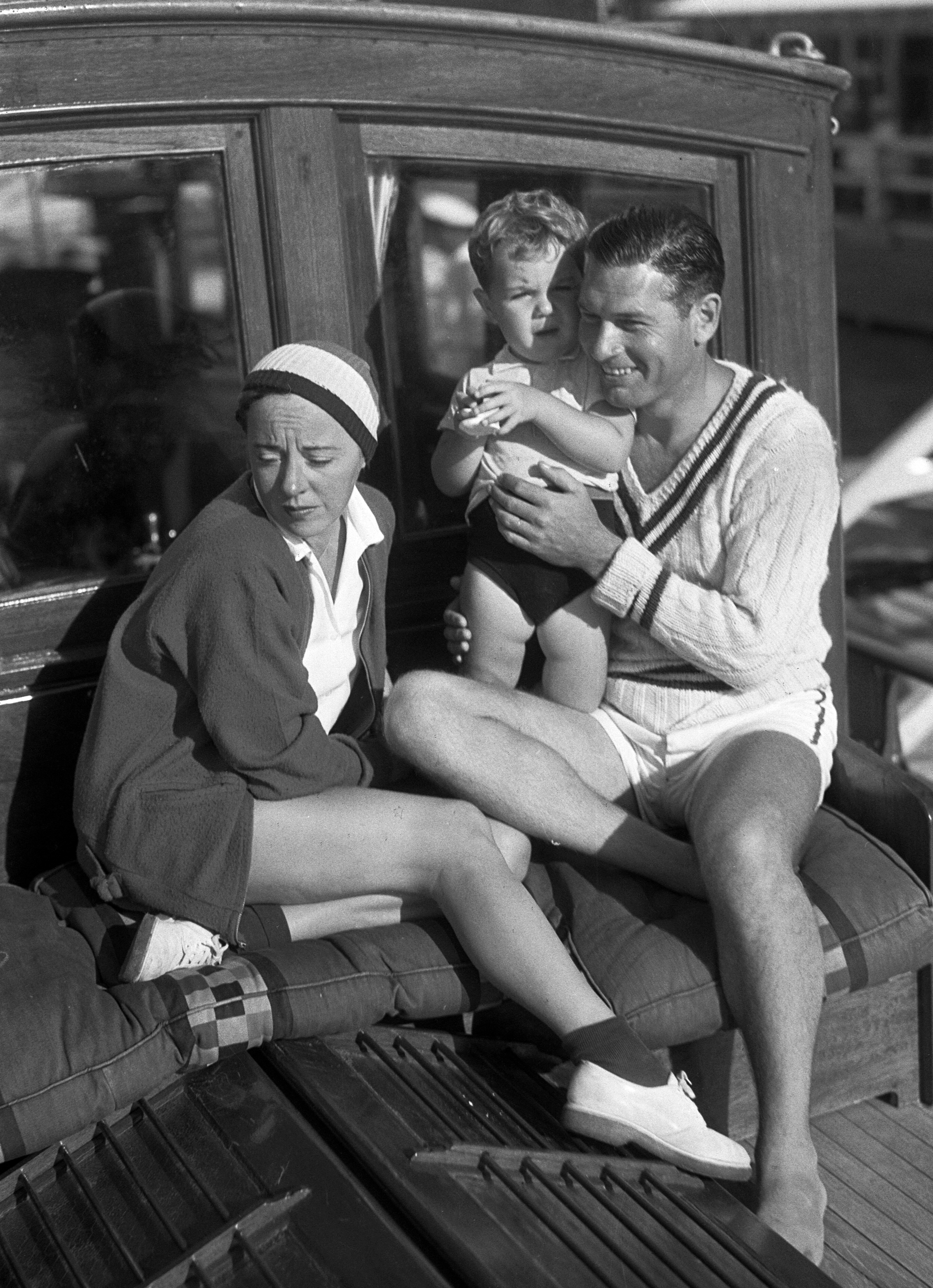
Ralston, Arlen and son in 1935 on their boat Jobyna R

Ralston was married twice, the first time to childhood beau John Campbell, the second in 1927 to actor Richard Arlen, whom she had met on the set of Wings. They had one child, actor Richard Arlen Jr. The family appears together in Hollywood on Parade # A-4. Ralston and Arlen divorced in late 1946.

During the last five years of her life Ralston suffered from rheumatism and had a series of strokes. She died in 1967 from pneumonia at the Motion Picture Country Home in Woodland Hills, California at age 67.

== Selected filmography ==
- A Sailor-Made Man (Uncredited, 1921)
- The Bride-to-Be (1922)
- Friday, the Thirteenth (1922)
- The Call of Home (1922)
- Take Next Car (1922)
- The Truth Juggler (1922)
- Touch All the Bases (1922)
- The Three Must-Get-Theres (1922)
- The Call of Home (1922)
- Wet Weather (1922)
- The Landlubber (1922)
- Soak the Shiek (1922)
- Bone Dry (1922)
- Face the Camera (1922)
- The Uppercut (1922)
- Shiver and Shake (1922)
- The Golf Bug (1922)
- Shine 'em Up (1922)
- Washed Ashore (1922)
- Harvest Hands (1922)
- The Flivver (1922)
- Blaze Away (1922)
- I'll Take Vanilla (1922)
- Fair Week (1922)
- The White Blacksmith (1922)
- Watch Your Wife (1923)
- Mr. Hyppo (1923)
- Don't Say Die (1923)
- Jailed and Bailed (1923)
- A Loose Tightwad (1923)
- Tight Shoes (1923)
- Do Your Stuff (1923)
- Shoot Straight (1923)
- For Safe Keeping (1923)
- For Guests Only (1923)
- For Art's Sake (1923)
- Why Worry? (1923)
- Winner Take All (1923)
- Girl Shy (1924)
- Hot Water (1924)
- Whispering Lions (1925)
- The Freshman (1925)
- Are Parents Pickles? (1925)
- Whistling Lions (1925)
- Between Meals (1926)
- Humor Risk (1926)
- Don't Butt In (1926)
- For Heaven's Sake (1926)
- Sweet Daddies (1926)
- Gigolo (1926)
- The Kid Brother (1927)
- Special Delivery (1927)
- Lightning (1927)
- Wings (1927)
- A Racing Romeo (1927)
- Pretty Clothes (1927)
- Little Mickey Grogan (1927)
- The Night Flyer (1928)
- The Count of Ten (1928)
- Black Butterflies (1928)
- The Big Hop (1928)
- The Toilers (1928)
- The Power of the Press (1928)
- Some Mother's Boy (1929)
- The College Coquette (1929)
- Rough Waters (1930) *Lost film
- Sheer Luck (1931)
- Hollywood on Parade # A-4 (1932)
