= Black Butterflies (1928 film) =

1928 film by James W. Horne

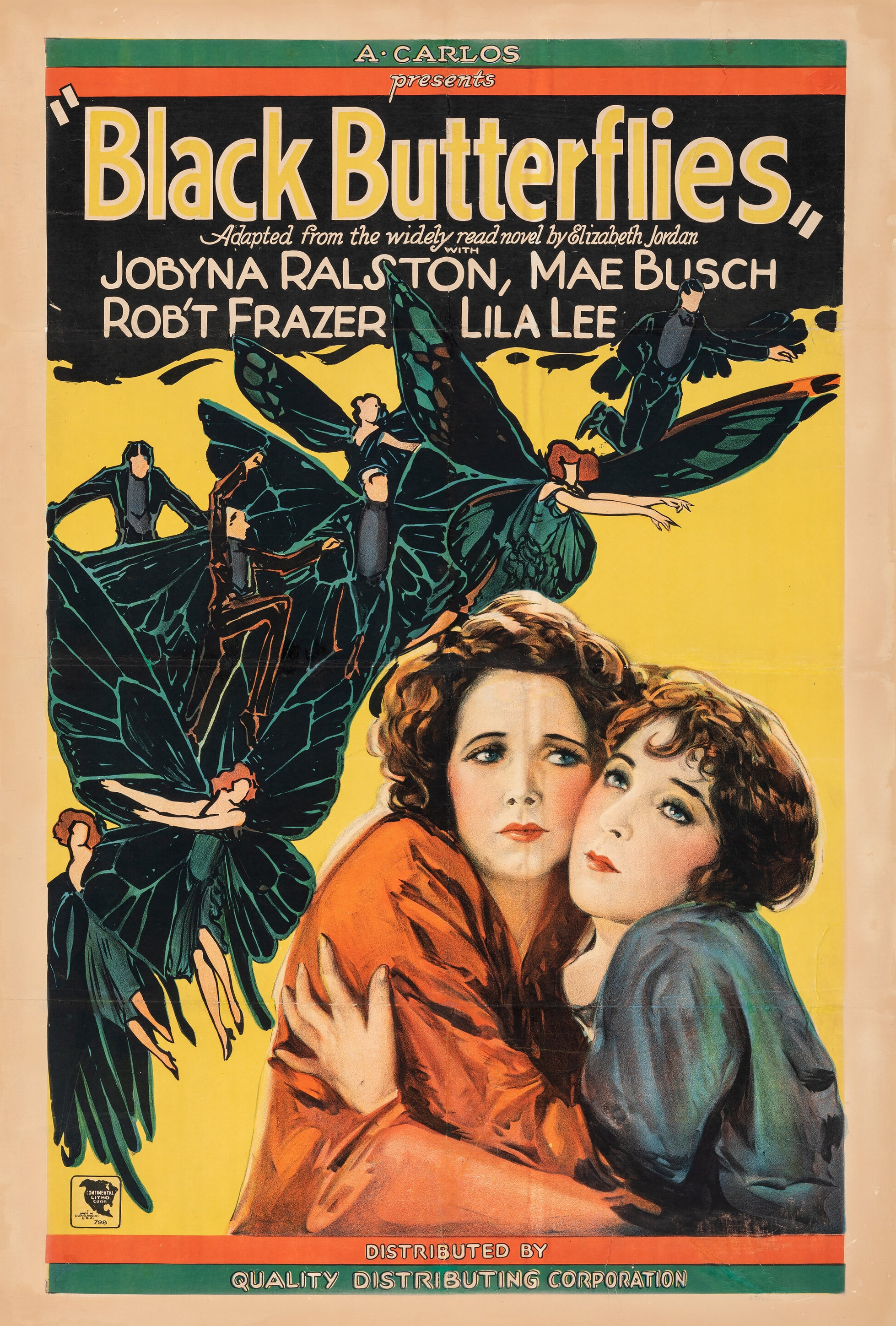
- Directed by: James W. Horne
- Written by: Henry McCarty; Delos Sutherland
- Starring: Jobyna Ralston; Mae Busch; Robert Frazer
- Cinematography: Max Dupont; Stephen S. Norton
- Edited by: Ralph Dawson
- Production company: Carlos Productions
- Distributed by: Quality Distributing Corporation
- Release date: August 31, 1928
- Running time: 70 minutes
- Country: United States
- Language: Silent (English intertitles)

Black Butterflies is a 1928 American silent drama film directed by James W. Horne and starring Jobyna Ralston, Mae Busch, and Robert Frazer.

== Cast ==
- Jobyna Ralston as Dorinda Maxwell
- Mae Busch as Kitty Perkins
- Robert Frazer as David
- Lila Lee as Norma Davis
- Cosmo Kyrle Bellew as Judge Davis
- Robert Ober as Jimmie
- Ray Hallor as Chad
- George Periolat as Hatch

== Censorship ==
When Black Butterflies was released, many states and cities in the United States had censor boards that could require cuts or other eliminations before the film could be shown. The Kansas censor board ordered a cut of an intertitle with the caption, "May we help ourselves to life's pleasures."

== Bibliography ==
- Goble, Alan. The Complete Index to Literary Sources in Film. Walter de Gruyter, 1999.
