= The Circus Kid =

1928 film

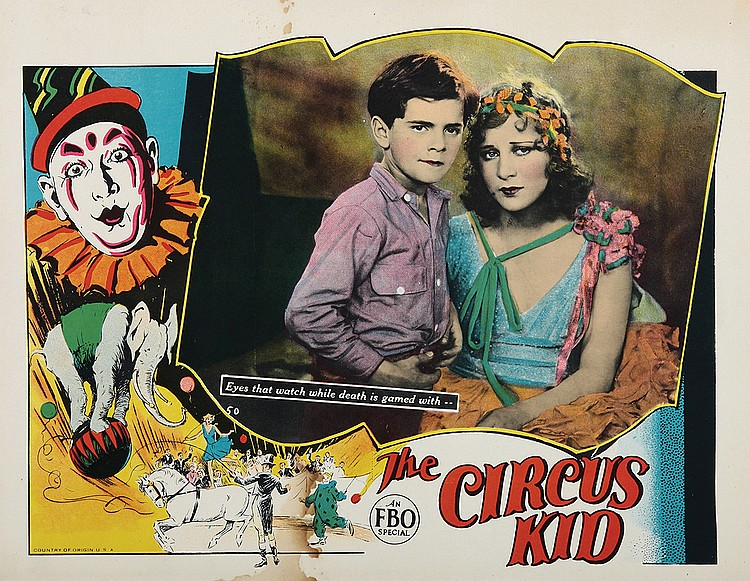
- Directed by: George B. Seitz; Charles Kerr (assistant)
- Written by: Melville Baker; James Ashmore Creelman
- Starring: Frankie Darro
- Cinematography: Philip Tannura
- Edited by: Ann McKnight
- Distributed by: Film Booking Offices of America (aka FBO)
- Release date: October 7, 1928
- Running time: 68 minutes
- Country: United States
- Languages: Sound (part-talkie); English intertitles

The Circus Kid is a 1928 American sound part-talkie drama film directed by George B. Seitz. In addition to sequences with audible dialogue or talking sequences, the film features a synchronized musical score and sound effects along with English intertitles. The soundtrack was recorded using the RCA Photophone sound-on-film system. A print of the film exists.

== Plot ==
Buddy, a scrappy and fearless orphan with a flair for acrobatics, escapes from the Good Shepherd Orphanage after a trip to Cadwallader’s Colossal Circus, run by Cadwallader. Determined to join the troupe, Buddy climbs into the cage of the “man-eating ape” and charms the creature, Zozo the Gorilla, then hides there as the circus departs.

Once discovered, Buddy wins over seasoned clown Poodles, high-spirited equestrienne Trixie, and brave lion tamer Tad. They take him under their wing, dressing him in clown garb and teaching him stunts, including the daring tent-pole slide and high-wire feats.

Meanwhile, washed-up former lion tamer King Kruger, once a star but now crippled by fear and alcohol, battles to reclaim his dignity and position. Secretly in love with Trixie, Kruger remains unaware that her heart belongs to Tad. Trixie, ever kind, encourages Kruger’s efforts to reform, but her compassion is misread as romantic interest.

The circus is soon targeted by Skelly Crosley, a ruthless bootlegger, who tries to drag Kruger back to the bottle. Kruger nearly succumbs until Tad and Trixie intervene. Afterward, Buddy urges Kruger to face his fears by entering the lion cage. When Kruger hesitates, Buddy tosses in his cap and enters himself. Confronted with Buddy's imminent peril, Kruger finds his courage, storms the cage, and rescues him—rekindling his lion-taming spirit.

As the circus circles back to Buddy’s old town for its final show of the season, the orphans are again invited. Kruger dons his uniform for a long-awaited return to the ring, still struggling but resolute. Trixie gives him a new ceremonial whip. Yet moments before the show, Kruger overhears Trixie and Tad discussing their plans to marry. Heartbroken, he retreats—and asks Skelly for liquor.

Outside, Skelly opens the barrier inside the lion wagon that separates Moloch the Killer, a violent and untamable lion, from the rest of the pride. As rain lashes the big top, Buddy begins his crowd-favorite tent-pole slide act. Tad enters the lion arena—only to see Moloch creeping in among the other beasts. Shouts rise from the crowd as keepers rush in. Lightning strikes, plunging the tent into darkness.

In the chaos, Tad is injured. When light returns, he lies unconscious in the ring, with Moloch stalking him. From above, Buddy sees the scene and slides down the wire into the ring. He grabs a whip and fends off the beast.

Kruger, bottle in hand, sees Buddy's bravery and bolts into the arena. As Moloch charges, Kruger throws himself between the boy and the lion. A violent battle ensues. Keepers rush in and finally shoot the animal, but not before Kruger is mortally wounded.

Tad revives and embraces Trixie, who rushes to his side. As the crowd looks on in stunned silence, Kruger, gravely injured, smiles at the young couple and whispers that he finally did his best—earning redemption in his final moments.

== Cast ==
- Frankie Darro as Buddy
- Poodles Hanneford as Poodles
- Joe E. Brown as King Kruger
- Helene Costello as Trixie
- Sam Nelson as Tad
- Lionel Belmore as Beezicks
- Charles Miller as Cadwallader
- John Gough as Skelly Crosley (as Johnny Gough)
- Syd Crossley as Skelly's Runner (as Sid Crosley)
- Charles Gemora as Zozo, the Gorilla

== See also ==
- List of early sound feature films (1926–1929)
