= Naughty Nanette =

1927 film

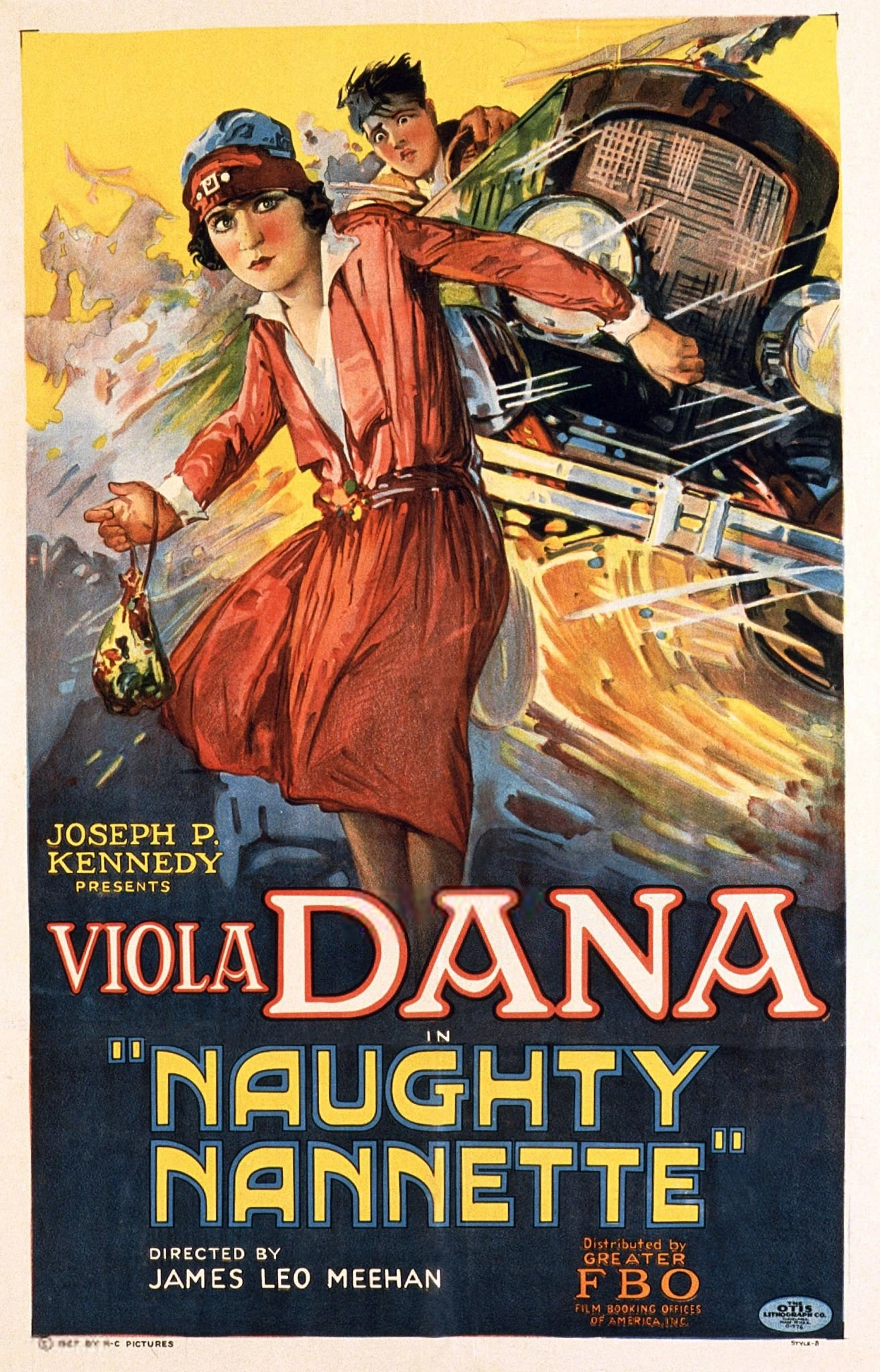
- Directed by: James Leo Meehan
- Screenplay by: Doris Schroeder
- Story by: Charles Henry Smith
- Starring: Viola Dana; Patricia Palmer; Eddie Brownell; Helen Foster; Roger Moore; Sidney De Gray
- Cinematography: Allen G. Siegler
- Production company: Robertson-Cole Pictures Corporation
- Distributed by: Film Booking Offices of America
- Release date: April 15, 1927
- Running time: 50 minutes
- Country: United States
- Language: English

Naughty Nanette is a 1927 American comedy film directed by James Leo Meehan and written by Doris Schroeder. The film stars Viola Dana, Patricia Palmer, Eddie Brownell, Helen Foster, Roger Moore and Sidney De Gray. The film was released on April 15, 1927, by Film Booking Offices of America.

== Cast ==
- Viola Dana as Nanette Pearson
- Patricia Palmer as Lola Leeds
- Eddie Brownell as Bob Dennison
- Helen Foster as Lucy Dennison
- Roger Moore as Bill Simmons
- Sidney De Gray as Grandfather Dennison
- Alphonse Martell as Carlton
- Mary Gordon as Mrs. Rooney
- Florence Wix as Mrs. Trainor
- Barbara Clayton as Dorothy Trainor
