= The Man with My Face (novel) =

1948 novel by Samuel W. Taylor

- First edition (publ. A.A. Wyn)
- Author: Samuel W. Taylor
- Language: English
- Publisher: A.A. Wyn
- Publication date: 1948
- OCLC: 1430781
- LC Class: PZ3.T21795 Man

The Man with My Face is a 1948 mystery novel by Samuel W. Taylor that was the basis for the 1951 film of the same title. It was first serialized in Liberty magazine. Taylor wrote the screenplay for the film with others, including Edward Montagne.
