= Gance =

Gance is a French surname. Notable people with the surname include:

- Abel Gance (1889–1981), French film director, producer, writer, and actor
- Henri Gance (1888–1953), French weightlifter

== See also ==
- Gane
