= A Girl of the Limberlost (1924 film) =

1924 film directed by James Leo Meehan

- Directed by: James Leo Meehan
- Based on: A Girl of the Limberlost by Gene Stratton-Porter
- Produced by: Gene Stratton-Porter
- Starring: Gloria Grey; Emily Fitzroy; Arthur Currier
- Production company: Gene Stratton-Porter Productions
- Distributed by: Film Booking Office of America
- Release date: April 28, 1924
- Running time: 60 minutes
- Country: United States
- Language: Silent (English intertitles)

A Girl of the Limberlost is a 1924 American silent film, produced by Gene Stratton-Porter and directed by James Leo Meehan. It stars Gloria Grey, Emily Fitzroy, and Arthur Currier, and was released on April 28, 1924. The first adaptation of Stratton-Porter's famous novel, this silent film is considered lost.

== Plot ==
The movie is set in Indiana, around the Limberlost swamp. It is the story of a young girl, Elnora Comstock, who is emotionally abused by her mother, who blames her for the death of her father. Elnora has a love of nature and sells her moth collection to pay for her education. As she begins her education, Elnora finds that she is exceptionally gifted in her classes, particularly in mathematics. Soon, she meets Phillip Ammon with whom she falls in love with. Phillip, who is engaged to Edith Carr, finds himself conflicted between the two. This results in Edith, who is angered by his interest in Elnora, jilting him.

However, Edith later attempts to rekindle the affection between the pair causing Elnora to leave in order to allow Phillip decide who he wishes to be with. Elnora's mother, Kate Comstock, eventually learns of the faithlessness of her husband and tries to make up to her daughter for her neglect and harshness. Philip then becomes sick and Elnora, who had been away, returns to take care of him. Deciding that he is truly in love with Elnora, Phillip asks her to marry him.

== Cast ==
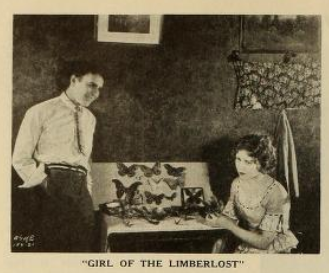
Still from the movie

- Gloria Grey as Elnora Comstock
- Emily Fitzroy as Kate Comstock
- Arthur Currier as Robert Comstock
- Raymond Mckee as Phillip Ammon
- Gertrude Olmsted as Edith Cart
- Cullen Landis as Hart Henderson
- Alfred Allen as Wesley Sinton
- Virginia Boardman as Margaret Sinton
- Myrtle Vane as Elvira Carney
- Buck Black/Newton Hall as Billy
- Lisamae Grey as the Bird-Woman

== Production and distribution ==
The 1924 film was produced by Gene Stratton-Porter Productions, a film company the author herself founded to translate her many novels into movies. Porter was the primary writer of the story and scenarios and the film was directed by her son in law, James Leo Meehan. The silent movie was 6 reels long, approximating to around an hour in length. The aspect ratio was 1.33:1. A Girl of the Limberlost was distributed by the Film Booking Office of America (FBO) and received much praise from the public.

== Reception ==
Following its release on April 28, 1924 this film received high praise from critics. Indeed, reviewers praised the acting in the film, one reviewer for Moving Picture World writing that Emily Fitzroy's portrayal of the somber, brooding women dominates the first half of the picture, partly through the dramatic force of the story and largely through her own expertness." Another reviewer for Exhibitors Herald mimics this opinion, also commenting on the "fine work" Gloria Grey performs throughout the movie.

The film was largely successful, noted as one of the surprise pictures of the year. In Everett, Washington, A Girl of the Limberlost made more money than some of the best pictures of the year and it played for 3 weeks in Los Angeles. The New York Daily News wrote, "If you've read the book, go see the picture,-if you haven't read it, go see it anyway."
