= James Leo Meehan =

American film director

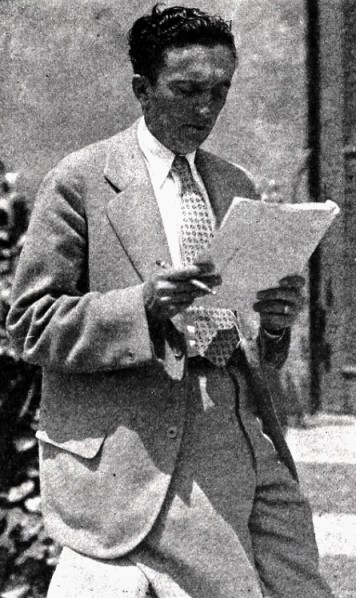
- From a 1925 magazine
- Born: July 22, 1891; Illinois, United States
- Died: November 8, 1943 (aged 52); San Francisco, California, United States
- Occupations: Director, Writer
- Years active: 1921-1930 (film)

James Leo Meehan (1891 – 1943) was an American film director and screenwriter. He married the daughter of writer Gene Stratton-Porter, and adapted several of his mother-in-law's novels for the screen.

He directed Campus Sweethearts (US 1930 RKO, 27 min, only shown at State Lake, Chicago - Natural Vision also shown in 35 mm) starring Rudy Vallee with Ginger Rogers among the cast. It is one of the early wide-gauge films.

== Selected filmography ==
- Michael O'Halloran (1923)
- A Girl of the Limberlost (1924)
- The Keeper of the Bees (1925)
- Laddie (1926)
- The Magic Garden (1927)
- Naughty Nanette (1927)
- The Harvester (1927)
- Judgment of the Hills (1927)
- Little Mickey Grogan (1927)
- Wallflowers (1928)
- The Little Yellow House (1928)
- Campus Sweethearts (1930)

== Bibliography ==
- Munden, Kenneth White. The American Film Institute Catalog of Motion Pictures Produced in the United States, Part 1. University of California Press, 1997.
