= Judgment of the Hills =

1927 film

- Directed by: James Leo Meehan
- Written by: Dorothy Yost
- Produced by: Joseph P. Kennedy
- Starring: Virginia Valli; Frankie Darro; Orville Caldwell
- Cinematography: Allen G. Siegler
- Production company: Film Booking Offices of America
- Distributed by: Film Booking Offices of America
- Release date: August 1, 1927
- Running time: 60 minutes
- Country: United States
- Languages: Silent; English intertitles

Judgment of the Hills is a 1927 American silent drama film directed by James Leo Meehan and starring Virginia Valli, Frankie Darro and Orville Caldwell. The film is set in the Cumberland Mountains of Kentucky during World War I.

== Cast ==
- Virginia Valli as Margaret Dix
- Frankie Darro as Tad Dennison
- Orville Caldwell as Brant Dennison
- Frank McGlynn Jr. as Jeb Marks
- John Gough as Lige Turney

== Bibliography ==
- Munden, Kenneth White. The American Film Institute Catalog of Motion Pictures Produced in the United States, Part 1. University of California Press, 1997.
