= The Man with My Face (film) =

1951 film by Edward Montagne

- Theatrical release poster
- Directed by: Edward Montagne; Charles Kerr (assistant)
- Screenplay by: Tom McGowan; Edward Montagne; Samuel W. Taylor; Vin Bogert
- Based on: the novel The Man with My Face by Samuel W. Taylor
- Produced by: Ed Gardner
- Starring: Barry Nelson; Carole Mathews; Lynn Ainley
- Cinematography: Fred Jackman, Jr.
- Edited by: Gene Milford
- Music by: Robert McBride
- Production company: Edward F. Gardner Productions
- Distributed by: United Artists
- Release date: June 14, 1951 (New York)
- Running time: 79 minutes
- Country: United States
- Language: English

The Man with My Face is a 1951 American film noir directed by Edward Montagne and starring Barry Nelson, Carole Mathews and Lynn Ainley.

Although the original novel is set in California, the film takes place in Puerto Rico.

== Plot ==
Chick Graham has settled in Puerto Rico after the war to operate a small business with his army buddy and brother-in-law Buster Cox. Graham returns home one evening to find his wife Cora acting as though he is an insane stranger.

A man who exactly resembles Graham named Bert Rand has taken his place and is playing cards and drinking in his living room. Neither Cora nor Buster, nor the family dog, recognizes Graham. They think that he, rather than Rand, is the double.

Graham's face has appeared on the front page of newspapers as a bank robber in Miami who stole half a million dollars. As Graham evades the police, he attempts to solve the mystery with the help of Mary Davis, an old girlfriend whom he had jilted in order to marry Cora. Mary's protective brother Walt Davis is wary, but soon joins Graham in trying to solve the mystery.

Rand attempts to kill Graham by hiring an attack-dog specialist to send a Doberman Pinscher after him. The evil double has been involved in the sinister plan with Cora and Buster since before the Grahams' marriage.

== Cast ==
- Barry Nelson as Charles "Chick" Graham / Albert "Bert" Rand
- Carole Mathews as Mary Davis
- Lynn Ainley as Cora Cox Graham
- John Harvey as Buster Cox
- Jim Boles as Meadows
- Jack Warden as Walt Davis
- Henry Lascoe as Police Sergeant
- Johnny Kane as Al Grant
- Chinita as Juanita
- Armando Miranda as Nightclub Bartender

== Reception ==
In a contemporary review for The New York Times, critic A. H. Weiler called the film "a tepid tale more concerned with dialogue than excitement" and wrote: "[T]his melodrama about a decent accountant and a bond thief, a gent who could pass as his identical twin, has the charm of distant places and ineffectiveness of an improbable story. Mr. Gardner, who broadcasts from Puerto Rico, has taken advantage of that island's exotic surroundings to come up with, we are told, the first feature film to be shot there and scenic effects that are unique. The yarn they're spinning, however, is hardly unique. Drab is the word."
