= Abie's Irish Rose (disambiguation) =

Abie's Irish Rose is a play by Anne Nichols.

Abie's Irish Rose may also refer to:

- Abie's Irish Rose (1928 film), a film directed by Victor Fleming
- Abie's Irish Rose (1946 film), a film directed by A. Edward Sutherland
