= List of people from Tampa, Florida =

Notable people from Tampa, Florida

This is a list of notable people from Tampa, Florida.

== A ==
- Eddie Ababio (born 1988), soccer player and coach
- Cannonball Adderley (1928–1975), saxophone player
- Nat Adderley (1931–2000), cornet player
- Philip Agee (1935–2008), CIA whistleblower
- Doug Allen (born 1951), football player
- Kirsten Bloom Allen, ballet dancer and actress
- Geronimo Allison (born 1994), professional football player
- T.D. Allman (born 1944), writer, foreign correspondent, historian, author
- Aric Almirola (born 1984), stock car driver
- Pete Alonso (born 1994), professional baseball player
- Jose Alvarez (born 1956), professional baseball player
- Austin Amer (born 2000), soccer player
- Erin Andrews (born 1978), sports anchor
- Gilbert Arenas (born 1982), professional basketball player
- Mike Awesome (1965–2007), professional wrestler

== B ==
- Derek Backman (born 1966), soccer player
- Jeff Baisley (born 1982), professional baseball player
- George F. Baughman (1915–2004), first president of New College of Florida, rear admiral, USNR
- Derek Bell (born 1968), professional baseball player
- Butch Benton (born 1957), professional baseball player
- Dan Bilzerian (born 1980), professional poker player
- Paul Bilzerian (born 1950), financier convicted of securities fraud
- Les Blank (1935–2013), documentary filmmaker
- Sheila Bleck (born 1974), professional bodybuilder
- Salha "Mama" Bobo (1907–2001), Ybor business pioneer
- Isaiah Bolden (born 1999), professional football player
- Pam Bondi (born 1965), Florida attorney general
- John Austin Branch (born 1908), Florida politician
- William Brennan (born 1963), professional baseball player
- Evelyn Brent (1895–1975), actress
- Corey Brown (born 1985), professional baseball player
- Bob Buckhorn (born 1958), mayor of Tampa
- Mike Bynum (born 1978), professional baseball player

== C ==
- CADE (born 1996), singer/songwriter, musician
- Cody Carson (born 1989), singer
- Aaron Carter (1987–2022), actor/singer
- Jeff Carter (born 1964), professional baseball player
- Leslie Carter (1986–2012), singer
- Nick Carter (born 1980), singer of the Backstreet Boys
- Rick Casares (1931–2013), professional football player
- Kevin Cash (born 1977), professional baseball player
- Santiago Castañeda (born 2004), soccer player
- Kathy Castor (born 1966), U.S. representative and former Hillsborough County commissioner
- Celph Titled (born 1980), rapper, record producer
- John Cena (born 1977), professional wrestler, actor, rapper, television presenter
- Ray Charles (1930–2004), blind blues and pop singer, pianist
- Jordan Clarkson (born 1992), professional basketball player for the New York Knicks
- Barry Cohen (1939–2018), criminal defense attorney
- Nardi Contreras (born 1951), professional baseball player
- Matthew Cox (born 1969), former mortgage broker and fraudster; "Most Wanted" by Secret Service in 2006
- Ron Crawford (born 1945), actor and artist
- Tim Crews (1961–1993), professional baseball

== D ==
- Helen Gordon Davis (1926–2015), Florida state legislator
- Nancy Davis (born c. 1977), investor, businessperson
- Ryan Davis (born 1989), professional football player
- Jules Dervaes (1947–2016), urban farmer and environmentalist
- Doechii (born 1998), Grammy Award-Winning rapper, singer-songwriter, & actress
- Howell Emanuel Donaldson III (born 1993), serial killer
- Toney Douglas (born 1986), basketball player for Hapoel Eilat of the Israeli Basketball Premier League
- Cory Doyne (born 1981), professional baseball player
- Sam Dyson (born 1988), professional baseball player

== E ==
- Carl Everett (born 1971), professional baseball player

== F ==
- Lenny Faedo (born 1960), professional baseball player
- David Fagen (1870– date of death unknown), Buffalo Soldier, anti-imperialist
- Ernest Ferlita (1927–2015), Jesuit priest and playwright
- Mike Figga (born 1970), professional baseball player

== G ==
- Gallagher (1947–2022), watermelon-smashing comedian
- Robert Gant (born 1968), actor
- Joanna Garcia (born 1979), actress
- Steve Garvey (born 1948), professional baseball player
- Walter Lee Gibbons (1928–2015), pitcher in Negro league baseball and the Minor Leagues
- Mychal Givens (born 1990), MLB pitcher
- Graham Godfrey (born 1984), professional baseball player
- Luis Gonzalez (born 1967), professional baseball player
- Dwight Gooden (born 1964), professional baseball player
- Arjun Gupta (born 1986), actor

== H ==
- Bob Hall (born 1942), member of Texas State Senate
- Denny Hamlin (born 1980), professional stock car driver
- Garry Hancock (1954–2015), professional baseball player
- Rondo Hatton (1894–1946), actor, reporter
- Eric Hayes (born 1967), football player
- Mike Heath (born 1955), professional baseball catcher
- Fallon Henley (born 1994), pro wrestler
- Jaclyn Hill (born 1990), entrepreneur and internet personality
- Hulk Hogan (1953—2025), actor/wrestler
- Melissa Howard (born 1977), actress/comedian
- Rodney Howard-Brown, Christian evangelist and pastor of River Church
- John Hudek (born 1966), professional baseball pitcher
- Joe Hudson (born 1991), professional baseball catcher
- Gary Huff (born 1951), professional football player
- Dario Hunt (born 1989), basketball player for Hapoel Haifa of the Israeli Basketball Premier League
- Lauren Hutton (born 1943), supermodel, actress

== I ==
- Paul D. Irving (born 1957), sergeant at arms of the United States House of Representatives

== J ==
- Carter Jenkins (born 1991), actor
- Tate Johnson (born 2005), soccer player
- Matt Joyce (born 1984), professional baseball player

== K ==
- Kamelot (formed 1991), power metal band
- Jill Kelley (born 1975), philanthropist and advocate
- Jen Kiggans (born 1971), U.S. representative for Virginia
- Richard King, Academy Award-winning sound designer
- Tarence Kinsey (born 1984), basketball player for Hapoel Jerusalem of the Israeli Premier League
- Joseph Kittinger, former United States Air Force officer
- KJ-52 (born 1975), Christian rapper
- Bert Kreischer, comedian
- Ryszard Kukliński, Polish soldier and CIA agent

== L ==
- Bernard LaFayette (born 1940), civil rights leader
- Tony LaRussa (born 1944), professional baseball player
- Laurel Lee (born 1974), U.S. representative and former Secretary of State of Florida and judge of the Thirteenth Judicial Circuit Court of Florida
- Tony Little (born 1956), fitness equipment pitchman
- Bobby Joe Long (1953–2019), serial killer executed by lethal injection
- Al López (1908–2005), professional baseball player
- Vance Lovelace (born 1963), professional baseball player
- Sumter de Leon Lowry Jr. (1893–1985), businessman, civic leader, National Guard commander and segregationist political figure

== M ==
- Dave Magadan (born 1962), professional baseball player
- Matt Mantei (born 1973), professional baseball player
- Sam Marsonek (born 1978), professional baseball player
- Andrew Martin (1975–2009), Canadian professional wrestler, died in Tampa
- Robert Martinez (born 1934), politician, former governor of Florida
- Tino Martinez (born 1967), professional baseball player
- Billy Mays (1958–2009), TV commercial pitchman
- Eugene McCaslin (born 1977), professional football player
- Lance McCullers (born 1964), professional baseball player
- Tom McEwen (1923–2011), sportswriter
- Fred McGriff (born 1963), professional baseball player
- Butterfly McQueen (1911–1995), actress, Gone with the Wind
- Alex Mechanik (born 1986), filmmaker
- Peter Mellor (born 1947), English-born American soccer player and coach
- Jason Michaels (born 1976), professional baseball player
- Sam Militello (born 1969), professional baseball player
- Rich Monteleone (born 1963), professional baseball player
- MoistCr1tikal (born 1994), YouTuber, streamer, musician
- Ashley Moody (born 1975), U.S. senator, former Florida attorney general
- Aaron Murray, professional football player

== N ==
- Gene Nelson (born 1960), professional baseball player
- Leslie Nicholas Jr. (1927–2007), businessman
- Reena Ninan (born 1979), Indian-American television journalist, founder of the news company Good Trouble Productions

== O ==
- Ralph Onis (1908–1995), professional baseball player

== P ==
- Ferdie Pacheco (1927–2017), physician, boxing analyst
- Sarah Paulson (born 1974), Emmy Award-winning actress
- Michelle Phan (born 1987), YouTube personality and entrepreneur
- Lou Piniella (born 1943), professional baseball player
- Peter Polansky, tennis player
- Rich Puig (born 1953), professional baseball player

== R ==
- Ryan Raburn (born 1981), professional baseball player
- John Ramos (born 1965), professional baseball player
- Chris Ray (born 1982), professional baseball player
- John Reaves (1950–2017), professional football player
- Jody Reed (born 1962), professional baseball player
- Roy Roberts (1906–1975), actor
- Shane Robinson (born 1984), professional baseball player
- Todd Rogers (born 1964), electronic sports player
- Jason Romano (born 1979), professional baseball player
- Calvin Royal III, ballet dancer

== S ==
- Tony Samuels (1954–2001), gridiron football player
- David Sanborn (born 1945), saxophonist
- Stephanie Moulton Sarkis (born 1974), psychotherapist and author
- Randy Savage (1952–2011), professional wrestler
- Emanuel Sharp (born 2004), American-Israeli basketball player
- Gary Sheffield (born 1968), professional baseball player
- Dakota Skye (1994–2021), pornographic actress
- Amber Smith (born 1971), actress and model
- Brittany Snow (born 1986), actress
- Jewels Sparkles (born 2001), drag queen and singer
- Matthew Stafford (born 1988), professional football player
- George Steinbrenner (1930–2010), philanthropist, principal owner of New York Yankees
- Stephen Stills (born 1945), singer/songwriter, musician
- Steve Swindal, businessman, chairman of the Port Tampa Bay
- John H. Sykes, businessman and philanthropist, founder of Sykes Enterprises

== T ==
- Channing Tatum (born 1980), actor
- Owen Teague (born 1998), actor
- Ernest Ivy Thomas Jr. (1924–1945), Marine, one of six who raised first flag on Mount Suribachi at Battle of Iwo Jima
- Randolph W. Thrower (1913–2014), former commissioner of the Internal Revenue Service
- Mel Tillis (1932–2017), country-western singer-songwriter and musician; Country Music Entertainer of the Year in 1976
- Santo Trafficante Jr. (1914–1987), Mafia boss
- Kyle Tucker (born 1997), Major League Baseball player
- Preston Tucker (born 1990), MLB player

== V ==
- David E. Vogt III, politician
- VoiceoverPete (Pete Accetturo) (born 1959), Internet personality

== W ==
- Dreama Walker (born 1986), actress
- Ted Washington (born 1968), professional football player
- Sharon Webb (1936–2010), science fiction writer
- Gavin Weiland (born 2000), musician
- Dan White (1908–1980), actor in vaudeville, theater, film and television
- John White (1935–1988), football player
- Slim Whitman (1923–2013), country music and western music singer
- Paul Wight (born 1972), professional wrestler, actor
- Mike Williams (born 1984), professional football player
- Charles R. Wilson (born 1954), federal judge

== Z ==
- Tony Zappone (born 1947), journalist, broadcaster, author
