= Lightnin' (1925 film) =

1925 film directed by John Ford

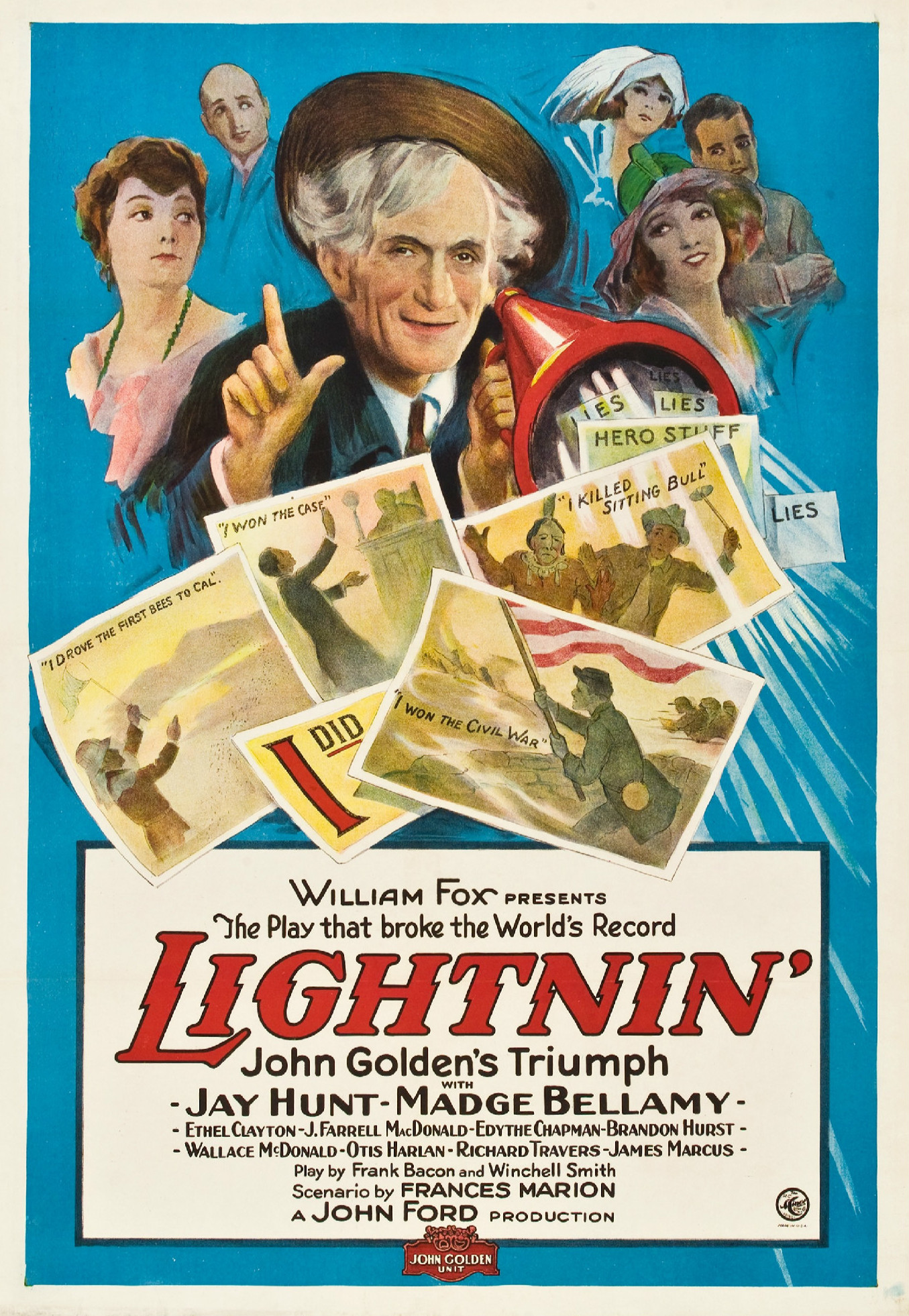
- Poster
- Directed by: John Ford
- Written by: Frances Marion
- Based on: Lightnin' by Winchell Smith and Frank Bacon
- Starring: Jay Hunt; Wallace MacDonald
- Cinematography: Joseph H. August
- Distributed by: Fox Film Corporation
- Release date: August 23, 1925
- Running time: 104 minutes
- Country: United States
- Language: Silent (English intertitles)

Lightnin' is a 1925 American silent comedy film directed by John Ford. A print exists in the Museum of Modern Art film archive. It was based on a successful play of the same name. The original run of the play started in 1918 at the Gaiety Theatre and continued for 1,291 performances, breaking the record for longest running play at that time. The film was remade in 1930 by Henry King for Fox as an early talkie starring Will Rogers with support from Louise Dresser and Joel McCrea.

== Plot ==
As described in a film magazine reviews, war veteran Lightnin’ Bill Jones is a likeable old man who has a friend in every acquaintance, and loves his dog and his liquor. His wife and he operate a hotel. When some swindlers from the city seek to get possession of the property, Lightnin’ Bill Jones sees through their scheme and refuses to sign the deeds. His wife construes his refusal as a malicious move and sues him for divorce. In the courtroom, she relents and, at the moment before the decree is handed down, they become reconciled.

== Cast ==
- Jay Hunt as William 'Lightnin' Bill' Jones
- Wallace MacDonald as John Marvin
- Richard Travers as Mr. Raymond Thomas
- J. Farrell MacDonald as Judge Lemuel Townsend
- Otis Harlan as Zeb
- Edythe Chapman as Mrs. Bill Jones
- Madge Bellamy as Miss Millie Jones
- Ethel Clayton as Margaret Davis
- Brandon Hurst as Everett Hammond
- James A. Marcus as Sheriff Blodgett (as James Marcus)
- Erville Alderson as Courtroom Attendant (uncredited)
- Frankie Bailey (uncredited)
- Nora Cecil as Passerby in Buggy (uncredited)
- Tommy Hicks as Otis Harlan's Son (uncredited)
- Peter Mazutis as Oscar (uncredited)
- Ida Moore as Courtroom Observer (uncredited)
- Francis Powers (uncredited)
