= Lightnin' (1930 film) =

1930 film

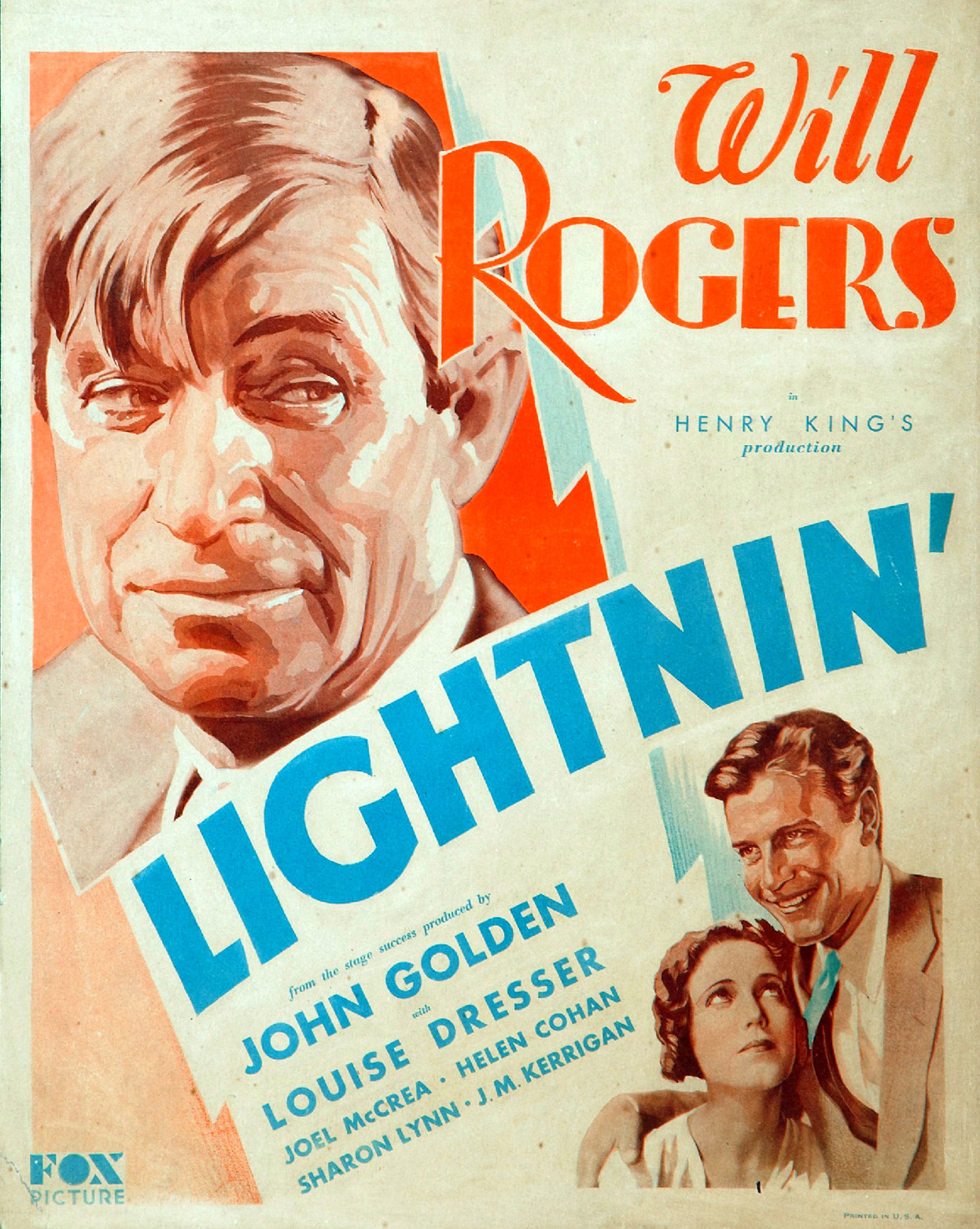
- Theatrical release poster
- Directed by: Henry King
- Screenplay by: S. N. Behrman; Sonya Levien
- Based on: Lightnin' by Winchell Smith and Frank Bacon (play)
- Produced by: John Golden; Henry King
- Starring: Will Rogers; Louise Dresser; Joel McCrea; Helen Cohan; Jason Robards Sr. Luke Cosgrave
- Cinematography: Chester A. Lyons
- Edited by: Louis R. Loeffler
- Music by: Arthur Kay
- Production company: Fox Film Corporation
- Distributed by: Fox Film Corporation
- Release date: December 7, 1930
- Running time: 96 minutes
- Country: United States
- Language: English

Lightnin' is a 1930 American pre-Code comedy film directed by Henry King and written by S. N. Behrman and Sonya Levien. The film stars Will Rogers, Louise Dresser, Joel McCrea, Helen Cohan, Jason Robards Sr. and Luke Cosgrave. The film was released on December 7, 1930, by Fox Film Corporation. It is a remake of the 1925 silent film, which was directed by John Ford, which itself was based on the 1918 play.

== Plot ==
Lightnin' has a young man come to his hotel to find his wife who is seeking a divorce. He talks to the two who obviously are in love, but they get in a tiff and the young man says he is leaving. Lightnin' whispers to wife to call him back, and then he has a sit down heart to heart talk and the couple leave with their marriage saved.

== Cast ==
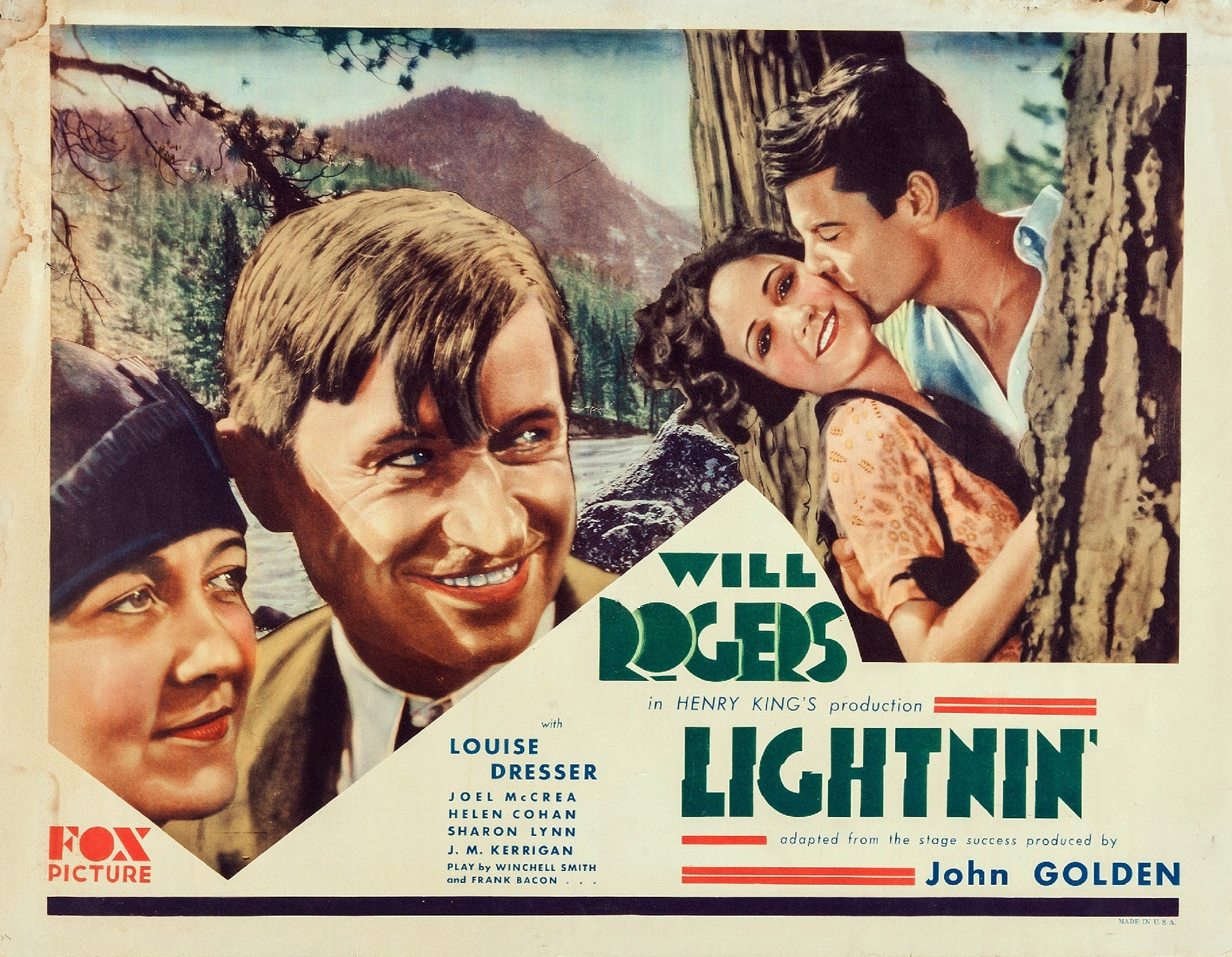
Theatrical release poster

- Will Rogers as Lightnin' Bill Jones
- Louise Dresser as Mrs. Mary Jones
- Joel McCrea as John Marvin
- Helen Cohan as Milly Jones
- Jason Robards Sr. as Raymond Thomas
- Luke Cosgrave as Zeb
- J. M. Kerrigan as Judge Lemuel Townsend
- Ruth Warren as Mrs. Margaret Davis
- Sharon Lynn as Mrs. Lower
- Joyce Compton as Betty
- Rex Bell as Larry
- Goodee Montgomery as Mrs. Brooks
- Phil Tead as Monte Winslow
- Walter Percival as Everett Hammond
- Charlotte Walker as Mrs. Thatcher

== Production ==
Lightnin' was filmed on location at Lake Tahoe.
