= A Girl of the Limberlost (1934 film) =

1934 film directed by Christy Cabanne

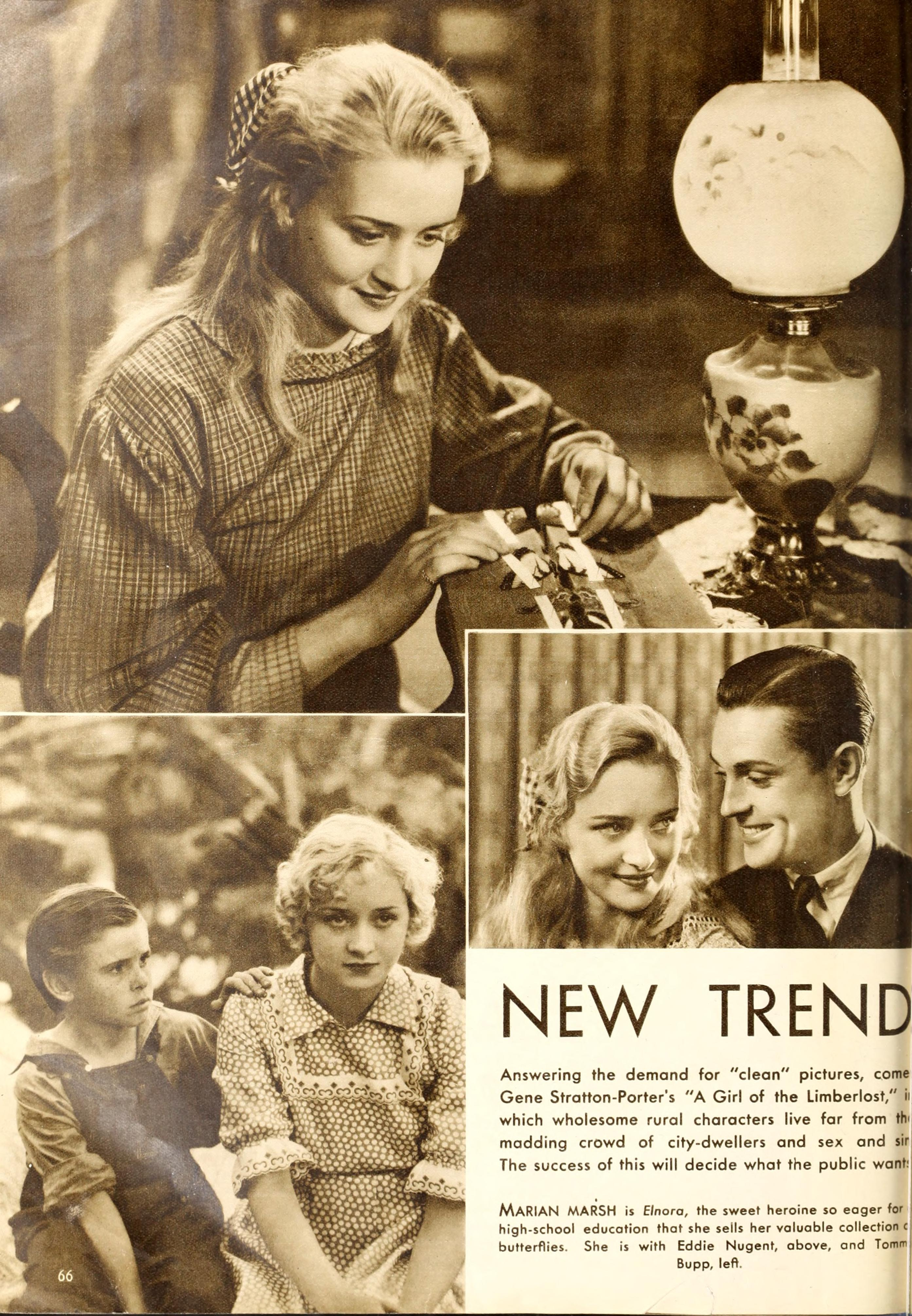
- Ad from Picture Play magazine, 1934
- Directed by: Christy Cabanne
- Screenplay by: Adele Comandini
- Based on: A Girl of the Limberlost by Gene Stratton-Porter
- Produced by: William T. Lackey
- Starring: Louise Dresser; Ralph Morgan; Marian Marsh
- Cinematography: Ira Morgan
- Edited by: Carl Pierson
- Production company: Monogram Pictures
- Release date: October 15, 1934 (US)
- Running time: 78 minutes
- Country: United States
- Language: English

A Girl of the Limberlost is a 1934 American drama film directed by Christy Cabanne. It stars Louise Dresser, Ralph Morgan and Marian Marsh, and was released on October 15, 1934. This is the second film adaption of Gene Stratton-Porter's 1909 novel of the same name. The first film adaptation had been released in 1924, and a third was released in 1945.

== Plot ==
In Indiana in 1893, Katherine Comstock has a discussion with her neighbors Margaret and Wesley Sinton about her baby who is due to be born. Katherine's husband Robert is walking back home that night and takes a path through the Limberlost swamp, but he gets tripped up and falls into a pool of quicksand. Katherine heads out into the swamp to help him, but by the time she reaches him, there's not much she can do and she watches her husband drown. Later, after the birth of her child who she named Elnora, Wesley and Margaret are seen with the baby. They discuss how sad it is that Katherine dislikes her newborn daughter. They wish that they could keep the baby if Katherine does not want her because they have recently lost a child of their own. Wesley says Elnora is the last thing Katherine has left after the death of her husband.

The story flashes forward many years later when Elnora is now a teenager. Elnora tells her mother that she is going to high school, though Kathrine initially refuses, wanting her daughter to stay home and do chores. On her way to school, Elnora stops by the Limberlost swamp at a tree, where inside she has been storing some of her belongings which include a moth collection. Once she's at school, she's met with some taunting from her classmates, which discourages her from wanting to return the next day. She later visits the Sintons, who encourage her to keep her spirits up and offer to help her pay for the books she needs for classes. At home, Katherine continues to treat Elnora with cruelty, blaming her for the death of her husband.

When Elnora heads to school for her second day, she catches a young boy named Billy attempting to steal from someone's home. She sits down with him and offers to him some of her lunch. After school, Elnora visits Mrs. Parker, who is known as “The Bird Woman” around their community. The Sintons had given Elnora the lady's name, letting her know that she would be able to help her. On her way home, Elnora encounters Billy again, who tells her that his dad is too sick, that he won't move or talk. They go to his house and see that his father had died, so Elnora takes Billy to the Sintons’ for help. The Sintons end up taking Billy in to care for him.

Some time later, Dr. Ammon visits the Sintons with his nephew Phillip, who takes an interest in Elnora. He offers her money for the Indian relics she had been collecting and tells her to use the money for her college funds. They later venture into the Limberlost, chasing moths to add to her collection. While there, he talks about his fiancé Edith back home in Washington, and that he was leaving town that night. They part with a promise to stay in touch.

In June 1913, Elnora is seen writing a letter to Phillip, letting him know that she has saved up enough money to pay for college, and that she no longer needs his help as he had once promised her. However, she checks her stash of funds that she kept in the tree in the swamp and learns that it has been stolen along with her moth collection. Elnora is distraught that she has lost the money she has been saving, especially because she was planning on buying a new dress for her upcoming graduation. Her mother offers to find a dress for her. However, on the day of her graduation, Elnora finds out that her mother did not get the dress as she had promised. After an argument, Elnora heads off to Mrs. Parker's, who offers to make her a graduation dress.

The two head to Elnora's school together for the ceremony as Katherine watches from across the street, clearly upset over her daughter running off to others for help instead of to her. She heads home and runs into Billy, who tells her how much money Elnora had lost and that he thinks he knows who stole the money. Katherine heads to the suspected culprit's house, but does not find him. She instead finds a sickly woman who she learns had an affair with her husband Robert up until his death. Katherine heads to Mrs. Parker's house to find Elnora, and begs her for forgiveness for treating her so terribly over a man who never loved her like she had thought. They reunite as Elnora forgives her mother.

After they arrive back home, Phillip comes back to town with his fiancé Edith. They invite Elnora to a party Phillip's uncle is throwing for them the next day. She is initially reluctant, but is encouraged to attend by her mother. At the party, Edith expresses her frustration at Phillip for talking about Elnora all night. When Phillip and Elnora meet up later that night, they come across a yellow emperor moth they had been looking for before, and chase after it into the Limberlost. They stop to talk, and Phillip leans in to kiss her, after which they agree they should head back to the party. When they get back, Edith accuses Phillip of cheating with Elnora, though they both deny it.

The next day, Phillip goes to the Comstock house to tell Elnora that he and Edith have ended their engagement, and wishes to have a relationship with her instead. Elnora refuses him and tells him that she feels guilty, thinking she's the reason they have broken up. Feeling distraught over her conflicted feelings, Elnora cries to herself in the middle of the Limberlost, claiming she no longer cares about her moths or college or anything anymore. Phillip goes off into the Limberlost to find her, but he finds her fallen into a pool of mud. He pulls her out and they embrace as the movie comes to a close.

== Cast ==
- Louise Dresser as Katherine Comstock
- Ralph Morgan as Wesley Sinton
- Marian Marsh as Elnora Comstock
- Henry B. Walthall as Dr. Ammon
- Eddie Nugent as Phillip Ammon
- Gigi Parrish as Edith Carr
- Helen Jerome Eddy as Margaret Sinton
- Betty Blythe as Mrs. Parker, "The Bird Woman"
- Barbara Bedford as Elvira Carney
- Robert Ellis as Frank Comstock
- Tommy Bupp as Billy

== Production ==
The Hollywood Reporter announced in late June 1934 that actress Marian Marsh, who played Elnora Comstock, had signed for the “Limberlost” leading role, and two days later they announced that Henry B. Walthall had signed for the film. Their announcement also included that Eddie Nugent, Gigi Parrish, Barbra Bedford, and Betty Blythe were signed for the film and that W.T. Lackey was to produce the film.

The Film Daily reported in mid-July that during the removal of Monogram headquarters from the General Service Studios to the Pathe Studios in Culver City, the production of “Girl of the Limberlost” had been at Talisman Studios. In early August they reported that the film was currently in the cutting room.

Diana Carey, who played an uncredited role as one of the high school students, described the rushed production schedule for the film:

"On a feature-length version of The Girl of Limberlost in which I played a role, no actor was ever idle nor did a camera ever get cold. We were shooting at five-thirty in the morning, and while one scene was being filmed another crew was setting up for the next. Actors rushed from one set-up to another without rest, and with barely time for rehearsal... Lunch was bolted down between takes. We sprinted through that feature-length juvenile masterpiece in five days flat, something of a record even in my book.”

== Reception ==
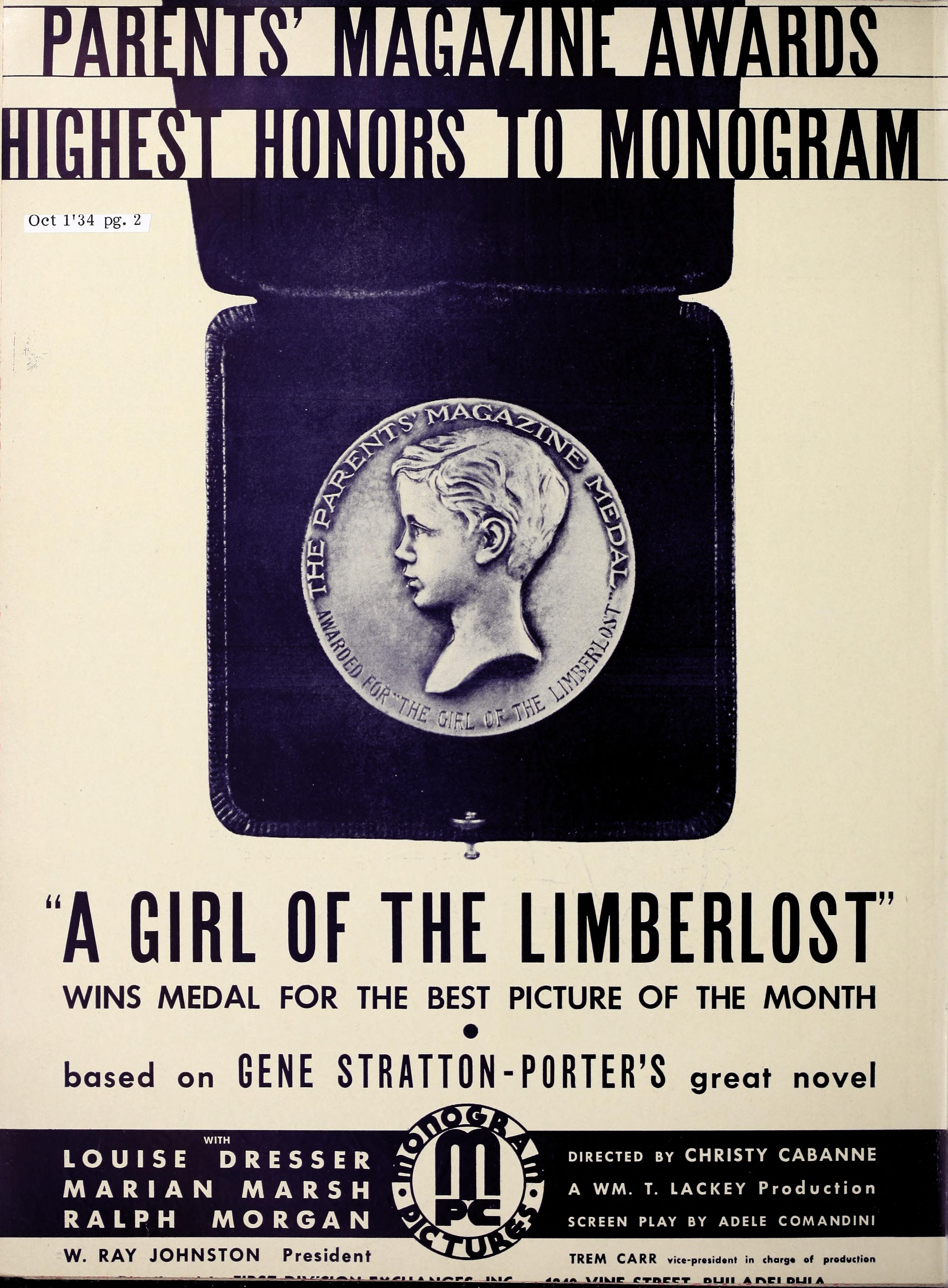
Parents' Magazine award announcement

The world premiere of the film was set for the week of September 15, 1934 at the Broadway Portland. After its release, the film was met with a warm reception being described by a review in The Film Daily as a “wholesome drama of backwoods [that] has the heart appeal and human touches for the crowds.” The film was also awarded the Best Picture of the Month Medal by Parents’ Magazine.
