= Ida Kramer =

Russian-born American actress (1877/78–1930)

Ida Kramer (1877 or 1878 – October 14, 1930} was an American actress. When she died, she held the world record for consecutive performances in one play.

== Early years ==
Born in Russia, Kramer came to the United States when she was 13. In her mid-teens, she joined a Jewish dramatic club.

== Career ==
Most of Kramer's early acting career was spent with Jewish theatrical companies, speaking Yiddish, particularly working with David Kessler and Jacob Adler. She also worked in vaudeville, touring the United States and performing in The Shattered Idol, a sketch about the life of a Jewish family.

After she married, Kramer quit acting, but her husband's illness led to her return. They moved to Colorado for his health, and she resumed acting to help support the family. Eventually, the family returned to New York, where she mixed performing with raising a baby and a toddler and doing household chores.

Kramer debuted on Broadway as a member of the chorus in La Belle Paree / Bow-Sing / Tortajada (1911). She also appeared in The Man with Three Wives (1913) and The Passing Show of 1914. In 1922, Kramer began portraying Abie Cohen's mother in Abie's Irish Rose at the Republic Theatre in New York. She continued in that role until the play closed in October 1927. During that span, she appeared in 2,327 consecutive performances, which established a world record. She also performed in the role for a few months in a touring production of the play and in the 1928 film adaptation of the play. Kramer identified with her role, saying: "Mrs. Cohen is me. She is all Jewish women. I am so tired many times, but when I get in my dressing room and make-up, I feel great. She is like a tonic to me."

Kramer belonged to Actors' Equity, the Hebrew Actors' Union, and the Jewish Theatrical Guild.

== Personal life ==
Kramer was married to Joseph Schneider, and they had two sons. In her later years, she visited orphanages, hospitals, and homes for the aged on Sundays, She also often visited a neighborhood populated by poor people, distributing food and toys.

== Death ==
Kramer died of heart disease on October 14, 1930, at her home in Brooklyn, aged 52. Her death came soon after she had a meal with her family in celebration of the Feast of Tabernacles.
