= James Nicholas =

James Nicholas may refer to:

- James A. Nicholas, orthopedic surgeon
- James H. Nicholas, yeoman, settler and politician
