= James H. Nicholas =

James Nicholas
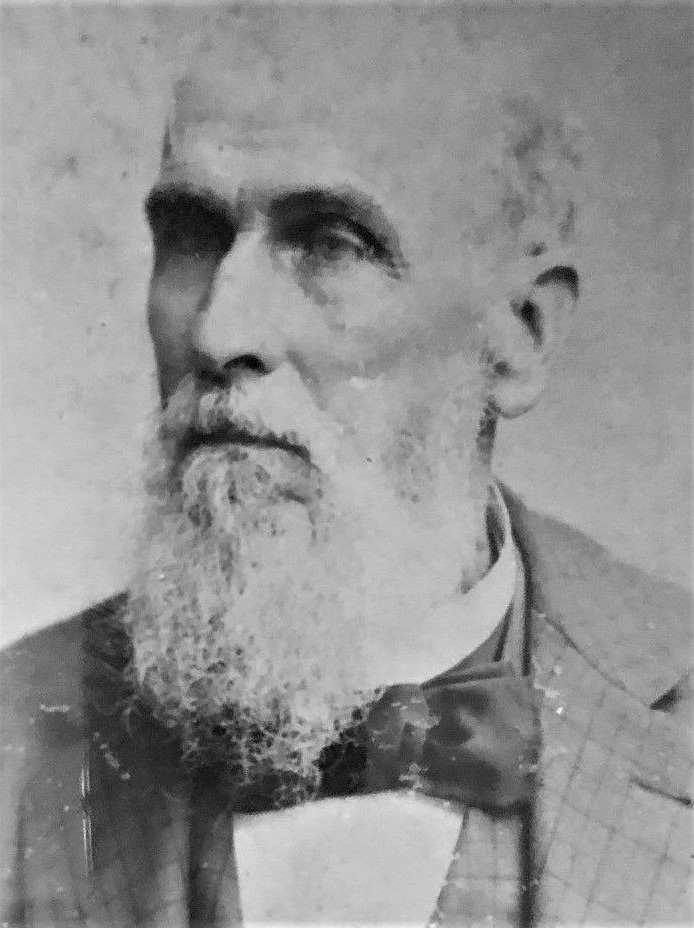
- James in the 1890s.
- Born: August 6, 1832; Appling County, Georgia
- Died: May 13, 1910 (aged 77); Screven, Georgia
- Political party: Democratic
- Spouse: Fannie Hopps
- Children: 9
- Parent(s): Jonathan Nicholas Jr. Susannah Nicholas
- Relatives: Leslie R. Nicholas (grandson); Anne Nichols (granddaughter); Jonathan Nicholas (grandfather)

James Hamilton Nicholas (August 6, 1832 – May 13, 1910) was a yeoman, early settler of Wayne County, Georgia, American Civil War Confederate Private and a Georgia General Assembly delegate of the Screven, Georgia, district to the state convention in 1892.

Nicholas was the biological grandfather of Anne Nichols.

== Early life ==
James Hamilton Nicholas was born on August 6, 1832, to Susannah and Jonathan Nicholas in Appling County, Georgia. Jonathan is posthumously called Jonathan Nicholas Jr. in contemporary genealogical records. In Edgefield, South Carolina Jonathan first began his career as a school teacher. Jonathan was married to Rachel Blackburn in 1815 but separated in 1817. He subsequently married Susannah Harden in 1819 and together had nine children including James. He moved his family to Appling County, Georgia, in the 1850s where he continued to be a school teacher. He died in 1859 Jonathan at 71 years old and was buried with his father Jonathan Nicholas in Morris County, New Jersey.

== Civil War ==
Nicholas enlisted in the Confederate States Army as a private on October 3, 1861, in the American Civil War along with his brothers Josiah and William. He was first with Company A, 1st Regiment, 1st Brigade of the Georgia State Troops, but mustered out of the Georgia State Troops on April 3, 1862, and enlisted in Company K, 54th Georgia Regiment in the Confederate States Army on May 16, 1862. A few months after enlisting in Company K he was discharged because of an unknown disability. William was later wounded in the shoulder at the Battle of Atlanta and surrendered in Tallahassee, Florida, on May 10, 1865. Josiah deserted Company K on April 23, 1862, near Savannah, Georgia, and was never heard from again.

== Wayne County ==
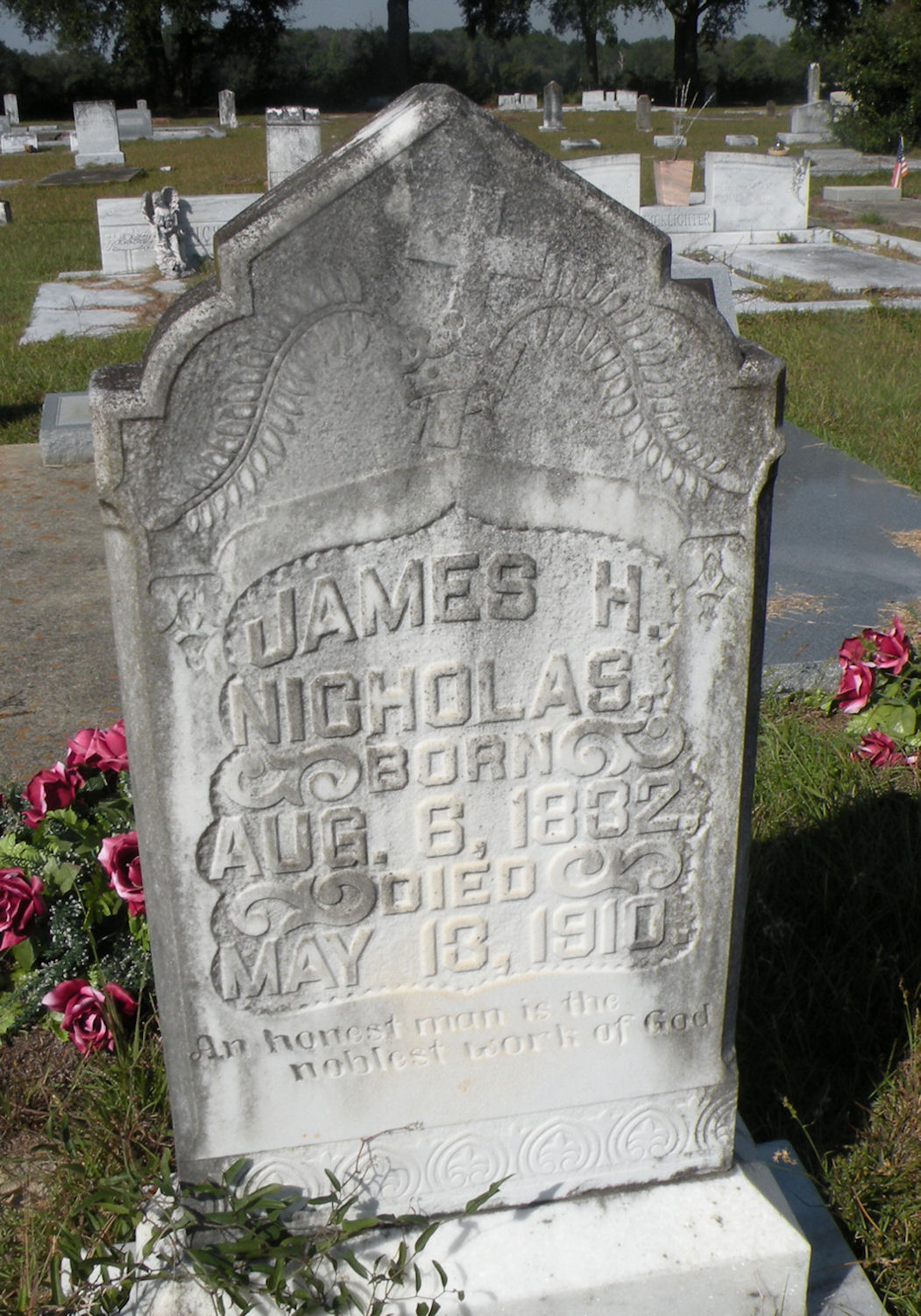
The grave of James Nicholas in Screven.

Nicholas married Sarah Hopps; they had nine children: Daniel, Francis, Alexander, William, Henry, Carrabella, Stephen, Mary and John. The family resided in Dales Mill near Jesup in Wayne County, Georgia, as a farmer.

In 1868 Nicholas had an affair with a local woman, Martha Bennett, that resulted in a son born in 1869 named George. Nicholas had served in Company K with Martha's husband William Bennett but he was killed in Charleston, South Carolina. Nicholas' wife Fannie most likely knew about the affair and one year after George was weaned Fannie managed to adopt the child as part of the Nicholas family. In 1889 George had a daughter named Anne Nichols in Dales Mill whom became a famous playwright notable for her work Abie's Irish Rose.

In 1892 Nicholas was appointed as a delegate to the 1217th district in Screven, Georgia, of Wayne County, Georgia, for the Democratic Party. Nicholas and selected delegates at the state convention selected representatives for Georgia to be sent to the 1892 Democratic National Convention in support of Grover Cleveland for the 1892 United States presidential election.

On August 9, 1910, Nicholas died at 77 years old in Screven, Georgia. His son Alexander Stephens Nicholas, named after Alexander H. Stephens, became the executor of his estate upon his death.
