= The Goose Woman =

1925 film

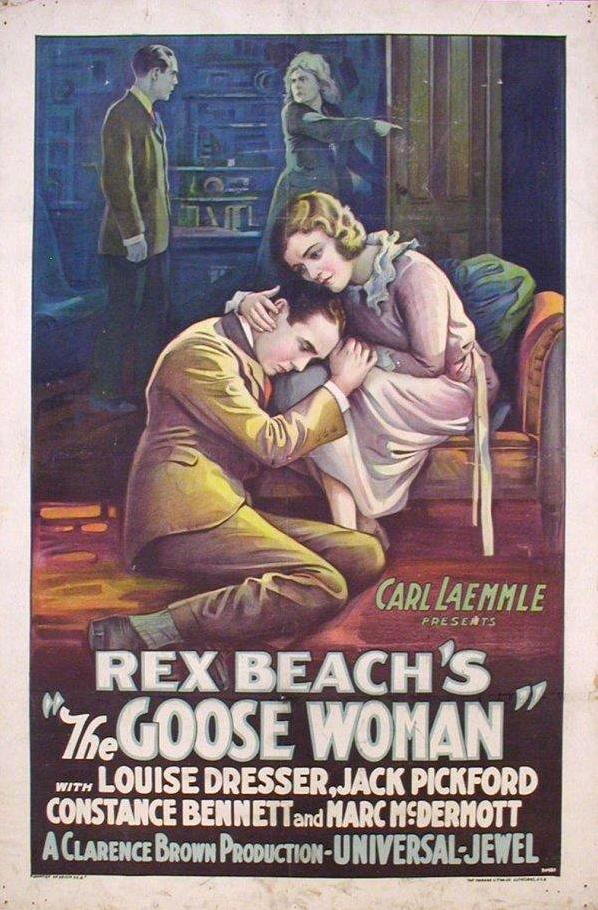
- Theatrical release poster
- Directed by: Clarence Brown
- Written by: Rex Beach (story); Melville W. Brown (scenario); Frederica Sagor (uncredited scenario); Dwinelle Benthall (intertitles)
- Produced by: Universal Pictures
- Starring: Louise Dresser; Jack Pickford; Constance Bennett
- Cinematography: Milton Moore
- Edited by: Ray Curtiss
- Distributed by: Universal Pictures
- Release dates: August 3, 1925 (New York City); December 27, 1925 (U.S.)
- Running time: 8 reels at 2,286 feet
- Country: United States
- Language: Silent (English intertitles)

The Goose Woman is a 1925 American silent drama film directed by Clarence Brown and starring Louise Dresser with Jack Pickford as her son. The film was released by Universal Pictures.

The Rex Beach short story is based in part on the then already sensational Hall–Mills murder case in which a woman named Jane Gibson is described as a pig woman because of the pigs she raised on her property.

== Plot ==
As described in a film magazine reviews, opera singer Mary Holmes loses her voice as a result of giving birth to a boy, and develops an intense dislike of her offspring. She becomes a victim of drink, living alone in a shabby cottage and raises geese. Her son wins the love of Hazel Woods, a young actress, who repulsed the vicious advances of a millionaire theatre-owner. The latter is murdered. To gain publicity, Mary invents a wild story about having witnessed the murder. The district attorney furnishes her with fine clothes, reveals her identity as a former stage star, and she is the sensation of the day. However, the details she concocts about the crime cause her son's arrest. Confronted with him, she experiences a sudden awakening of mother-love and confesses that her story is false. It transpires that the theatre doorman is the guilty person. The son is cleared and faces a happy future with his reformed parent and Hazel.

== Cast ==
- Louise Dresser as Marie de Nardi/Mary Holmes
- Jack Pickford as Gerald Holmes
- Constance Bennett as Hazel Woods
- George Cooper as A Reporter
- Gustav von Seyffertitz as Mr. Vogel
- George Nichols as Detective Kelly
- Marc McDermott as Amos Ethridge
- Spottiswoode Aitken as Jacob Rigg
- James O. Barrows as Unidentified role
- Kate Price as Matron

== Reception ==
Both critics and audiences favorably received the film. The Goose Woman was remade in 1933 as The Past of Mary Holmes featuring Helen MacKellar and Jean Arthur.
