= Anne Nichols =

American playwright (1891–1966)

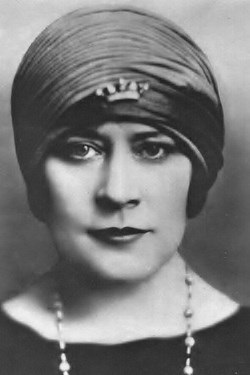
- Born: 26 November 1891; Dales Mill, Wayne County, Georgia
- Died: September 15, 1966 (aged 74); Englewood Cliffs, New Jersey
- Occupation: Playwright
- Spouse: Henry Duffy (1915-1924)
- Children: 1
- Parent(s): George Henry Westberry Nichols; Julia Anne Bates Nichols
- Relatives: James H. Nicholas (grandfather); Leslie R. Nicholas (cousin)

Anne Nichols (November 26, 1891 – September 15, 1966) was an American playwright best known as the author of Abie's Irish Rose.

== Biography ==
Anne Nichols was born in Dales Mill, in Wayne County, Georgia, to Julie and George Nichols. Her father George was the son of James Nicholas born in 1868. George had the Nicholas surname shortened to Nichols.

Nichols penned a number of Broadway plays, several of which were made into motion pictures. Her most famous production was Abie's Irish Rose, a farce depicting the tumult that arises with the marriage of a young Jewish man and an Irish girl. This play broke the record for the longest run in Broadway theater history, and was made into films in 1928 and again in 1946. Nichols sued Universal Studios for making The Cohens and Kellys, a film with a similar plot premise, but the use of stock characters was found to be outside of copyright protection in Nichols v. Universal Pictures Corp.

To a certain degree, Abie's Irish Rose paralleled the life of its author, who was born into a strict Baptist family, but married (and divorced) Henry Duffy, an Irish Catholic. Nichols wrote the play during this marriage, and would eventually convert to Catholicism herself.

In 1937 Nichols produced Hey Diddle Diddle, a comedy play written by Bartlett Cormack whose setting was a duplex apartment in Hollywood. The play premiered in Princeton, New Jersey, on January 21 with Lucille Ball as Julie Tucker, "one of three roommates coping with neurotic directors, confused executives, and grasping stars who interfere with the girls' ability to get ahead." The play received good reviews, but there were problems, chiefly with its star, Conway Tearle, who was in poor health. Cormack wanted to replace him, but Nichols said the fault lay with the character and insisted that the part needed to be reshaped and rewritten. The two were unable to agree on a solution. The play was scheduled to open on Broadway at the Vanderbilt, but closed after one week in Washington, D.C., when Tearle suddenly became gravely ill.

Nichols died from a heart attack while residing at a nursing home in Englewood Cliffs, New Jersey, at the age of 75.
