= Lightnin' (play) =

1918 comedic play by American playwrights Winchell Smith and Frank Bacon

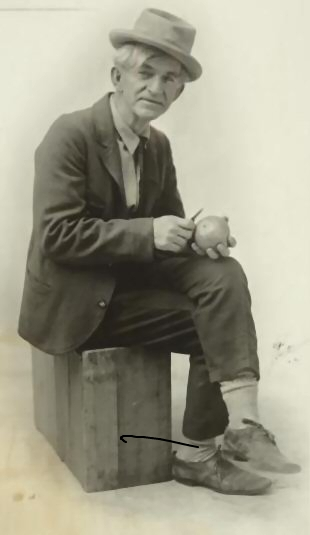
- Frank Bacon as Lightnin' Bill Jones
- Written by: Winchell Smith and Frank Bacon
- Characters: Lightnin' Bill Jones
- Original language: English

Lightnin' is a comedy play in three acts by Winchell Smith and Frank Bacon. The play was produced by John Golden and directed by P. E. McCoy. With Frank Bacon in the lead role and billed as "A Live Wire American Comedy", Lightnin' made its Broadway debut on August 26, 1918, at the Gaiety Theatre and played continuously over three seasons with a record breaking run of 1,291 performances. The show began its long national tour at the end of August 1921 and continued on for some time after Bacon’s death in November 1922. Lightnin' was revived in 1938 for a two-month run at the John Golden Theatre with Fred Stone playing Lightnin’ Bill Jones and was adapted for cinema twice in films starring Jay Hunt (1925) and Will Rogers (1930).

== Original Broadway cast ==
Actor	Role
Frank Bacon	Lightnin' Bill Jones
Bessie Bacon	Mrs. Harper
E. J. Blunkall	Everett Hammond
Sidney Coburn	Teddy Peters
Sam Coit	Nevin Blodgett
Fred Conklin	Liveryman
Harry Davenport	Rodney Harper
Mary Duryea	Mrs. Brainerd
William F. Granger	Walter Lennon
Frances Kennan	Mrs. Starr
James C. Lane	Hotel Clerk
Thomas MacLarnie	Lemuel Townsend
Beth Martin	Freda
Ralph Morgan	John Marvin
Beatrice Nichols	Mildred Buckley
Jane Oaker	Margaret Davis
Minnie Palmer	Mrs. Jordan
Jessie E. Pringle	Mrs. Jones
Phyllis Rankin	Mrs. Moore
George Spelvin	Zeb Crothers
Paul Stanton	Raymond Thomas
Helen Story	Mrs. Brewer
George Thompson	Oscar Nelson
Ruth Towle	Mrs. Corshall
Sue Wilson	Emily Jarvis

== Plot ==
The story takes place in the mythical town of Calivada where Lightnin' Bill Jones, or more correctly his wife, operates a rather seedy hotel that straddles the California-Nevada state line convenient for those looking for a quick Nevada divorce. He is nicknamed Lightnin’ because, as the local postmaster put it, “We call him Lightnin’ because he ain’t.”

Lightnin’ Bill, a Civil War veteran known to brag that he advised General Ulysses S. Grant, also claims to be a jack of all trades, having been at one time or another, a judge, inventor, detective and bee keeper. Of the latter profession he spins the tale that he once drove a swarm across the prairie in the midst of winter without the loss of a single bee. When pressed Lightnin’ Bill concedes that during the drive he may have been stung once or twice.

Lightnin’ Bill likes to spend his days and nights carousing with cronies rather than being at home with his wife and adopted daughter. When he refuses to go along with the sale of the hotel to a group of out-of-town businessmen, his wife becomes furious and files for divorce. In court Lightnin’ Bill, with the help of young John Marvin, is able to prove that the buyers are unscrupulous scoundrels and wins back the love of his wife.

== Critical response ==
The New York Times admitted that the play "does not contain a single situation which is dramatically new," but praised the "homely rural melodrama" for its "charm" and "humor." Almost all of the critics attributed the success of the play to Frank Bacon's performance in the title role, comparing him favorably to Joseph Jefferson in his legendary portrayal of Rip Van Winkle. For the final performance of the play's record-breaking run, President Warren G. Harding sent a letter, which was read from the stage, extolling the virtues of "an American play of the very highest type, by an American author, presented by American actors."

Contemporary scholar Jordan Schildcrout writes, "The world of Lightnin' hovers between the old and the new, with both gaslight and electric lights, both horse-drawn carriages and automobiles, existing at the same time. As the play entered the 1920s, these remnants of 'the old ways' seemed increasingly quaint, and its treatment of female characters increasingly outmoded."

== See also ==
- Lightnin' (1925 film)
- Lightnin' (1930 film)

Preceded by A Trip to Chinatown	Longest-running Broadway show 1920–1925	Succeeded by Abie's Irish Rose
