= Helen Cohan =

American actress (1910–1996)

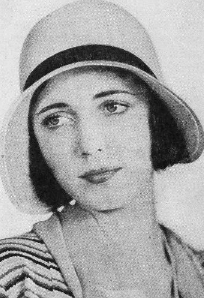
- Cohan in 1930
- Born: September 13, 1910; New York City, U.S.
- Died: September 14, 1996 (aged 86); Los Angeles, California, U.S.
- Occupations: Actress, dancer
- Father: George M. Cohan

Helen Cohan (September 13, 1910 – September 14, 1996) was an American stage dancer and briefly a Hollywood film actress. She was the youngest daughter of vaudeville and Broadway entertainer George M. Cohan.

== Life and career ==
She was born in New York City and studied at Marymount College in Tarrytown, New York and in France.

At the age of 17, she appeared as a dancer at New York's Heckscher Theatre in the 1928 Dance Recital produced by Ned Wayburn. Her first appearance on the stage came during the run of The Merry Malones at Erlanger's Theatre. She danced with her father for one performance.

In 1931, she joined her dad in his play Fast Friendships. The previous season, she played in the Kaufman-Lardner comedy June Moon. Miss Cohan spent five months in Hollywood hoping to break into motion pictures and then was signed to a contract by Fox Film in 1930. Her film credits are few; she had roles in Kiss and Make-Up (1934), The Penal Code (1932), and Lightnin' (1930). The latter movie featured Will Rogers.

She was listed by the WAMPAS Organization of film publicity men as one of 33 young actresses nominated for its annual selection of 13 Baby Stars in March 1934. She once provided a beauty hint which was syndicated in 1936 newspapers. Helen suggested giving one's skin a rest from make-up whenever possible: "During the hours at home, cleanse the face thoroughly and then let the pores breath. Do this as faithfully as you do your morning exercises."

In August 1931, Edward Wallace Dunn left his entire estate of $5,000 to Helen Cohan. Dunn was employed as personal representative to her father during the final 25 years of his life. Miss Cohan was listed as residing at the Hotel Savoy Plaza in New York. The will was dated October 5, 1929. Dunn died at age 74.

Upon his death on November 5, 1942, Cohan divided his estate equally among his widow and four children. The will, dated March 2, 1939, stated that the beneficiaries were to receive the principal of their trust funds in installments at specified ages, and under the codicil, if the income of any trust falls below $100 a month, the deficit may be made up out of the principal.

Helen Cohan died in Los Angeles, California, one day after her 86th birthday in 1996.
