= Jonathan Nicholas =

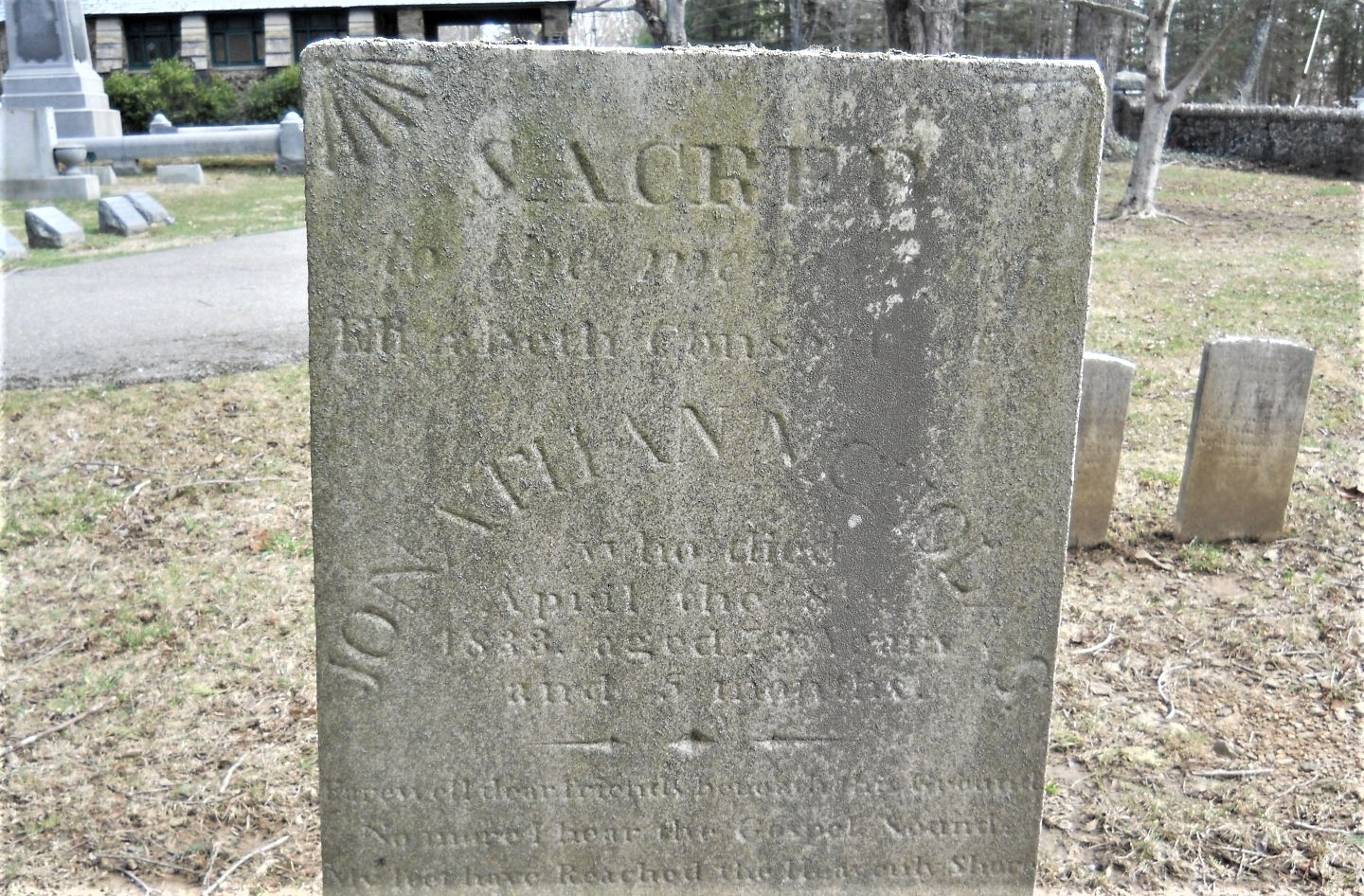
- Tombstone of Jonathan and Elizabeth Nicholas.
- Born: 1757 or 1759; Province of New Jersey or Wales
- Died: September 22, 1839; Flanders, New Jersey, U.S.
- Spouse: Elizabeth Lawler (m. 1779)
- Children: 12
- Relatives: Leslie R. Nicholas (great-great grandson)
- Military career
- Allegiance: United States of America
- Branch: United States Army
- Service years: 1777–1783
- Rank: Sergeant
- Conflicts: American Revolutionary War

Jonathan Nicholas (1757 or 1759 – September 22, 1839) was an early settler of Flanders, New Jersey, and a sergeant in the American Revolutionary War.

== Biography ==
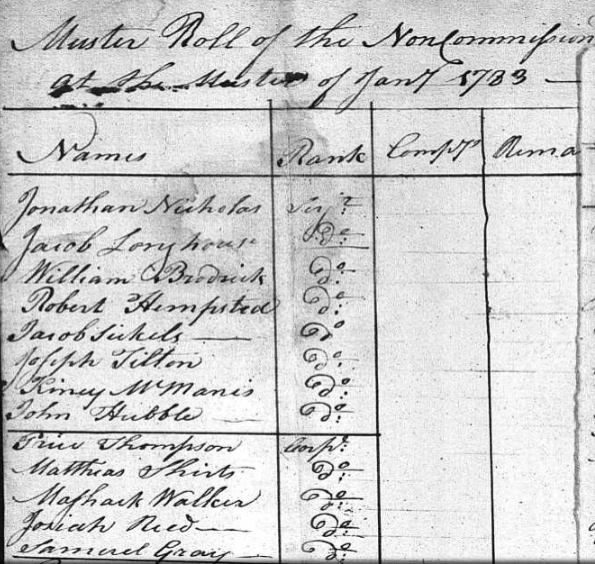
Muster roll of American Revolutionary War soldiers from 1783 with Sergeant Jonathan Nicholas at the top.

Jonathan Nicholas was born in the Province of New Jersey, British America. Contemporary genealogy records state that Jonathan was born in Wales but a letter written by his son William in 1850 says he was born in New Jersey. There are no primary sources to indicate he was from Wales despite a book published in the late 19th century indicating this. His father and mother are also unknown. It is possible his father is a Price Nicholas as indicated on his christening document. Jonathan's birthday is given in several sources as April 1, 1756 or 1757. His tombstone listed him at 73 years old and 5 months in 1833 giving him a birthday around November 1759. However, Jonathan's christening was at St. John's Episcopal Church on May 22, 1757.

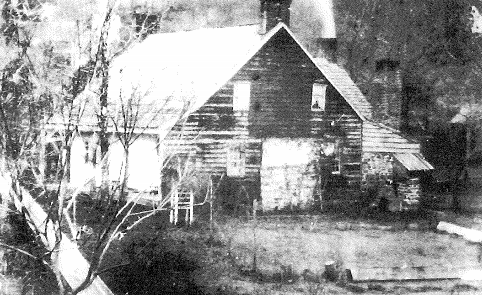
Jonathan Nicholas homestead in Morris County, New Jersey.

Jonathan enlisted in the American Revolutionary War in spring 1777 at Elizabethtown reaching the rank of sergeant. Jonathan was under the command of Captain Pierson part of Colonel Oliver Spencer's regiment. Jonathan took part in the commissary department assisting in attaining water for the soldiers in winter 1778. In 1778 Jonathan was transferred to Jonathan Dayton's regiment and took part in the Battle of Monmouth and Siege of Yorktown. Toward the end of the war on June 5, 1783 Jonathan was transferred to Colonel Spencer's regiment in New York where he was discharged from the war. At the end of the war General Nathanael Greene gave Jonathan a cane for his service.

After the war, Jonathan became a barrel maker and a settler in Flanders near Bottle Hill, in what is now Mount Olive Township, New Jersey. In 1799 Jonathan purchased 90 acres (36 ha) in Flanders for farming where he had a house built which housed his children and grandchildren. His grandson David Ayers Nicholas built a new house on the site of Jonathan's house which still stands today. The Nicholas house and land had been in the Nicholas family for over 125 years.

This may certify that I was acquainted with Jonathan Nicholas at the time of his enlistment in Colonel Spencer’s Reg. (one of the sixteen additional Regiments) in the Continental Army during the revolutionary war and that I became much better acquainted with him after he was transferred into the third N. Jersey Regt. Wherein he served a number of years in the rank of a Sergeant, and uniformly conducted himself as a good and faithful soldier, having continued in the N. Jersey line until the end of the war, when he obtained a regular discharge given at Elizabethtown this seventeenth day of February one thousand eight hundred of nineteen.

— Jonathan Dayton, 1819

In February 1810 Jonathan filed for a pension with district judge William Pennington because he was in need of financial assistance. Jonathan had assistance with Jonathan Dayton, at the time the former Speaker of the United States House of Representatives and United States Senator from New Jersey, by providing a testimony honoring Jonathan's service in his regiment. Jonathan began his pension for serving in the American Revolutionary War on February 16, 1819, suspended May 1, 1820 due to the Revolutionary War Pension Act and restored July 7, 1823.

== Family ==
Jonathan married Irish immigrant Elizabeth Lawler on May 16, 1779. Jonathan and Elizabeth had 12 children: Hannah, Nancy, John, Rhece, Jonathan Jr., David, Elizabeth, Lewis, Josiah, Elias, William and Jerusha.

Jonathan's grandson David Ayers Nicholas organized the First Presbyterian Church of Flanders in 1852, elected one of the first elders in Flanders, and one of the original stockholders of the First National Bank at Morristown. David organized the Pleasant Hill Cemetery where Jonathan was buried.

In 1916 Jonathan's great grandson David Oscar Nicholas became the first Nicholas to join the Sons of the American Revolution. Jonathan is the great-great grandfather of Leslie R. Nicholas through his son Jonathan Jr.
