= Abie's Irish Rose (1946 film) =

1946 film by A. Edward Sutherland

- Theatrical poster
- Directed by: A. Edward Sutherland
- Screenplay by: Anne Nichols
- Based on: Abie's Irish Rose by Anne Nichols
- Produced by: A. Edward Sutherland
- Starring: Michael Chekhov; Joanne Dru; Richard Norris; J. M. Kerrigan; George E. Stone; Vera Gordon; Emory Parnell
- Cinematography: William C. Mellor
- Edited by: William H. Ziegler
- Music by: John Scott Trotter
- Production company: Bing Crosby Productions
- Distributed by: United Artists
- Release date: December 27, 1946
- Running time: 96 minutes
- Country: United States
- Language: English

Abie's Irish Rose is a 1946 American comedy film directed by A. Edward Sutherland based on a play by Anne Nichols. The film stars Michael Chekhov, Joanne Dru, Richard Norris, J. M. Kerrigan, George E. Stone, Vera Gordon, and Emory Parnell. The film was released on December 27, 1946, by United Artists. It was a remake of the 1928 film that was based on the 1922 play Abie's Irish Rose by Anne Nichols. The film drew criticism for stereotyping and additional cuts were made after complaints.

== Plot ==
Stationed in London, the Jewish American soldier Abie Levy falls in love with a young Irish Catholic woman, Rosemary Murphy, and they get married. Their families are not informed, and when the time comes for Rosemary to travel to the United States, the only thing Abie tells his father Solomon is that he has met a girl and is in love.

Solomon takes a liking to Rosemary, but assumes she shares the same faith. A wedding is planned, no one else yet told that the couple are already husband and wife. The bride-to-be's father, Patrick Murphy, arrives, under the false impression that his daughter intends to wed an Irish Catholic man named McGee.

Once the truth is revealed, neither father is on speaking terms with the young couple or each other. A year goes by and Rosemary gives birth. Family friends, the Cohens, and an Irish priest, coax the grandfathers into finally making a visit. A baby boy, given the name Patrick Levy, promptly delights Patrick Murphy but disappoints Solomon, at least until the baby's twin sister, Rebecca, is also brought into the room. Rebecca being his late wife's name, Solomon is pleased, and the families finally come together.

== Cast ==
- Michael Chekhov as Solomon Levy
- Joanne Dru as Rosemary Murphy Levy
- Richard Norris as Abie Levy
- J. M. Kerrigan as Patrick Murphy
- George E. Stone as Isaac Cohen
- Vera Gordon as Mrs. Cohen
- Emory Parnell as Father John Whalen
- Art Baker as Rabbi Jacob Samuels
- Eric Blore as Stubbins
- Bruce Merritt as Rev. Tom Stevens
- Roy Atwell as Dick Saunders
- Eddie Parks as Gilchrist
- Vera Marshe as Mrs. Edna Gilchrist
- James Nolan as Policeman
- Charlie Hall as Hotel Porter
- Harry Hays Morgan as Hotel Clerk

== See also ==
- The Cohens and Kellys: A film with a similar plot
- Nichols v. Universal Pictures Corp.
- Bridget Loves Bernie: a CBS series depicting a similar interfaith marriage
