= Leslie Nicholas Jr. =

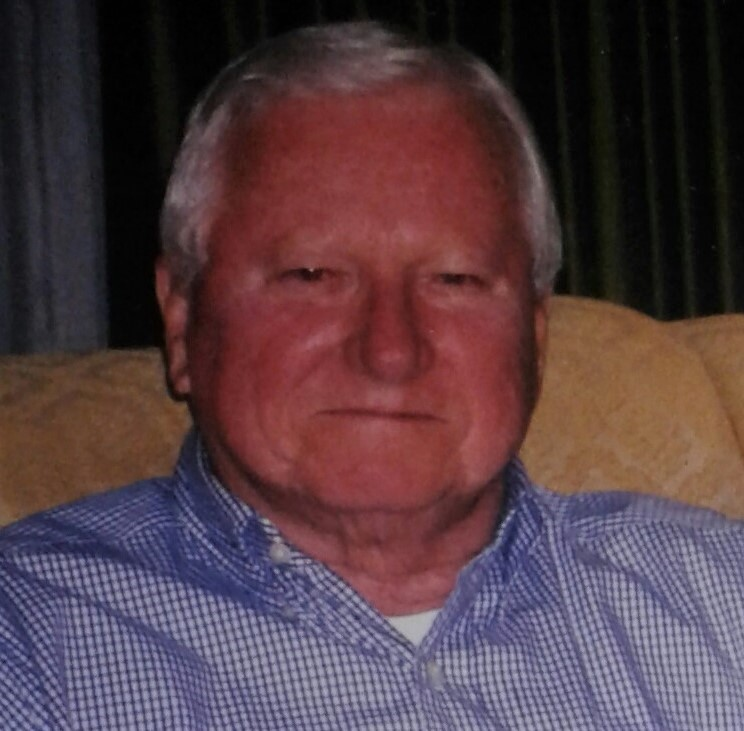
- Nicholas in 2002.
- Born: July 29, 1927; Tampa, Florida
- Died: July 29, 2007 (aged 80); Jacksonville, Florida
- Education: Emory University (BA)
- Spouses: Margurite Queen (m. 1949; div. 1973); Ruby Martin (m. 1979)
- Children: Lynn; Peggy; James; William; Thomas; Daniel; Joseph
- Parent(s): Leslie R. Nicholas; Sybil Nicholas

Leslie Robinson "Les" Nicholas Jr. (July 29, 1927 – July 29, 2007) was an executive of Southern Bell, member of the Atlanta Chamber of Commerce and a deacon at Southside Baptist Church in Jacksonville, Florida. From 1968 to 1982 Nicholas was the General Personnel Manager of Southern Bell in Georgia. Nicholas oversaw the last years of Southern Bell operations in Georgia before the Breakup of the Bell System in 1982.

== Southern Bell ==
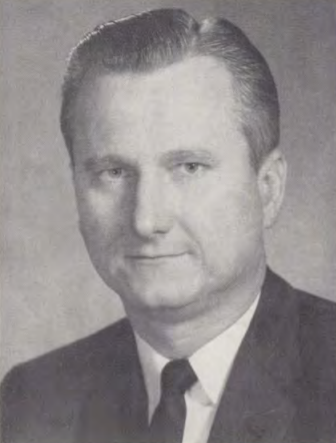
Nicholas in 1968.

Nicholas pursued a career with Southern Bell after graduating from Emory University in 1949 and received plant training as a traffic supervisor in 1950. Nicholas' job with Southern Bell forced him to move around throughout North Carolina to Charlotte, Greensboro, Gastonia and Raleigh. In March 1956 Nicholas was promoted to traffic manager of the Gastonia District in Gastonia. Nicholas was promoted three beginning in 1959 to traffic manager of the nearby Charlotte District in Charlotte, 1960 to the traffic manager of the Greensboro District in Greensboro and in 1963 to division traffic manager in Raleigh. From June to November in 1967 Nicholas served as the acting general personnel manager and then promoted to the general personnel manager the following year in Atlanta, Georgia for the Georgia Division.

In 1975 Nicholas was promoted to the state personnel manager of North Carolina in addition to Georgia at Southern Bell. In 1983 Nicholas as an executive participated in the reincorporation to BellSouth and its subsidiary BellSouth Telecommunications after the Breakup of the Bell System. After the incorporation to BellSouth Nicholas retired in 1985 and relocated to Fruit Cove, Florida.

== Personal life and family ==
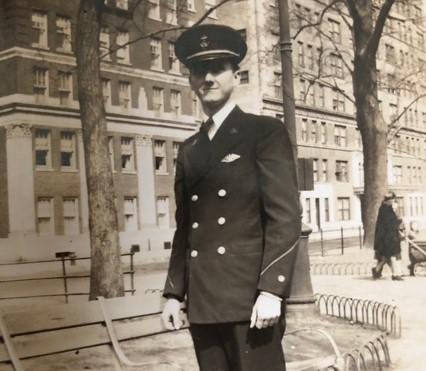
Nicholas in New York City in his United States Merchant Marine uniform in 1947.

Nicholas was the only child of Sybil and Leslie Robinson Nicholas. While Nicholas' father was away serving in the Pacific War his mother Sybil died of complications from diabetes on July 30, 1944. Because Nicholas was an only child at the time of his mother's death and father's absence due to the war he was forced to live at Riverside Military Academy in Gainesville, Georgia. After living at the academy Nicholas joined the United States Merchant Marine in 1946. Nicholas attended Oxford College of Emory University in 1947 joining the International Relations club, Phi Gamma, debate club, and was president of the freshman class. His father remarried in 1945 to Louise Knight and together had a son named Alexander. On December 17, 1948 Nicholas Sr. died of cancer and was buried at Arlington National Cemetery.

Nicholas graduated from Emory University in 1949 majoring in business administration. After graduating from Emory University Nicholas married Margurite Jean Queen on March 4, 1949 in Jacksonville, Florida. Nicholas and Margurite had seven children: Lynn (1950-1985), Peggy (born 1952), James (born 1954), William (1956-1980), Thomas (born 1959), Daniel (born 1963), and Joseph (born 1966). In 1973 Nicholas and Margurite divorced and in 1979 Nicholas remarried to chief operator at BellSouth and AT&T Ruby Martin. On September 12, 1980 his son William died in a drowning accident in Bartow, Georgia. On April 7, 1985 Nicholas' daughter Lynn died from complications of diabetes. Nicholas and Ruby joined the Southside Baptist Church in Jacksonville where he became a deacon. In his retirement years he became an American Civil War enthusiast collecting antiques from the time period. On July 29, 2007, the day of his birthday, Nicholas died from complications of pneumonia and diabetes.
