= Abie's Irish Rose (1928 film) =

1928 film by Victor Fleming

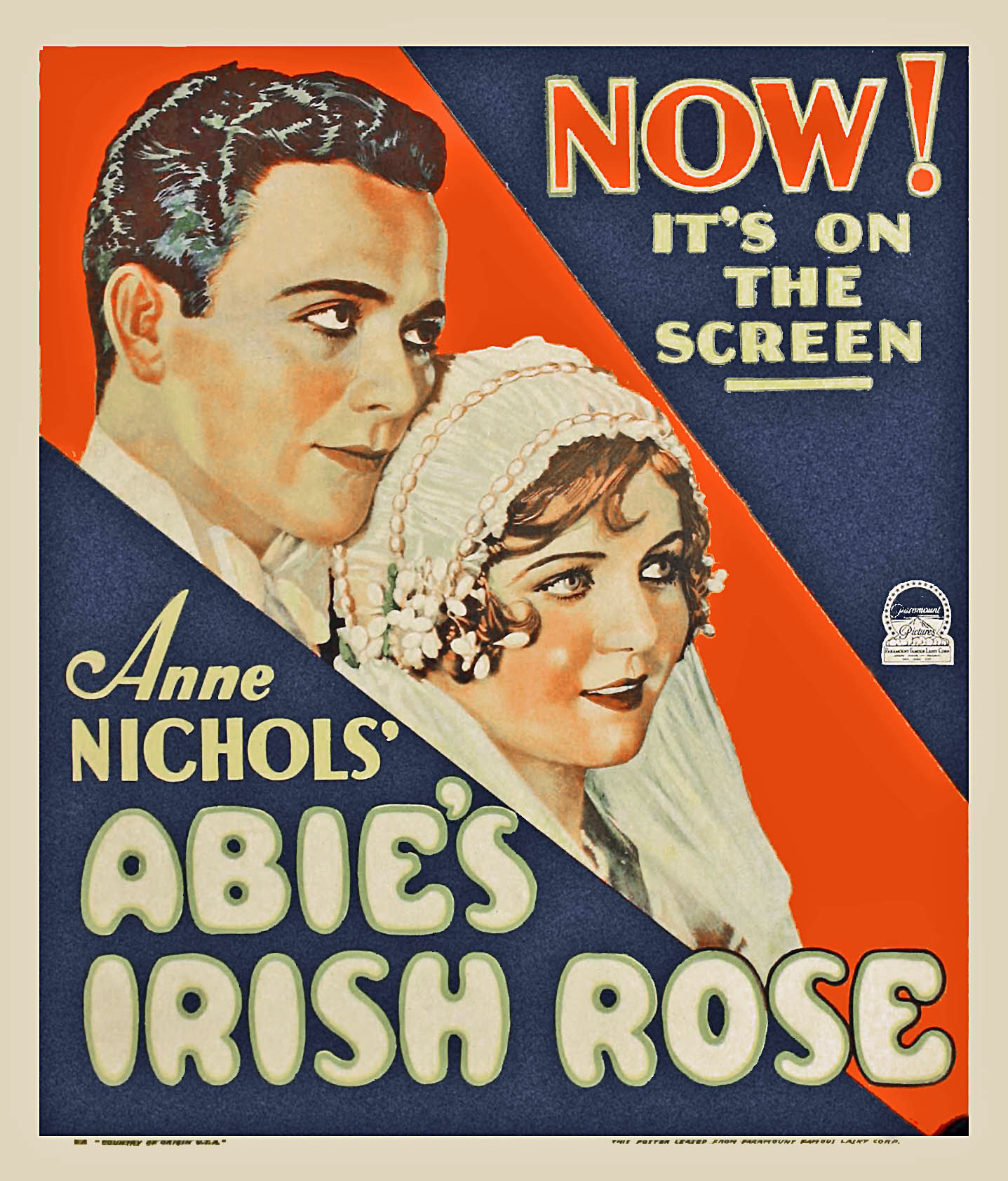
- Theatrical release poster
- Directed by: Victor Fleming
- Written by: Jules Furthman; Julian Johnson, Herman Mankiewicz (titles)
- Based on: Abie's Irish Rose by Anne Nichols
- Produced by: B. P. Schulberg
- Starring: Charles "Buddy" Rogers; Nancy Carroll; Jean Hersholt; J. Farrell MacDonald
- Cinematography: Harold Rosson
- Edited by: Eda Warren
- Music by: J. S. Zamecnik
- Production company: Paramount Famous Lasky Corporation
- Distributed by: Paramount Pictures
- Release date: November 3, 1928
- Running time: 12 reels (10,471 feet)
- Country: United States
- Languages: Sound (Part-Talkie); English
- Box office: $1.5 million

Abie's Irish Rose is a 1928 American early sound (part-talkie) comedy film directed by Victor Fleming and starring Charles "Buddy" Rogers, Nancy Carroll, Jean Hersholt, and J. Farrell MacDonald. In addition to sequences with audible dialogue or talking sequences, the film features a synchronized musical score and sound effects along with English intertitles. The soundtrack was recorded using the Western Electric sound-on-film system. The film based on the 1922 play Abie's Irish Rose by Anne Nichols. The film was later remade in 1946. In the 1930s, author Nichols revealed that her deal with Paramount brought her $300,000 plus half the film's profits.

== Plot ==
Rosemary Murphy, a lively Irish entertainer, meets Abie Levy, a young Jewish soldier in the A.E.F., while both are in France during World War I. They fall deeply in love and, despite coming from vastly different religious and cultural backgrounds, are convinced that nothing can stand in the way of true love.

After the war, Abie and Rosemary are married in a Methodist Episcopal Church in Jersey City. Abie takes his new bride home and introduces her to his father, Solomon Levy, an orthodox Jew. To soften the impact, he presents Rosemary as "Rosie Murpheski," his sweetheart. Delighted, Solomon plans a traditional Jewish wedding ceremony for the couple.

At the moment a rabbi is uniting the couple in a second ceremony, Patrick Murphy, Rosemary's staunchly Catholic father, arrives—accompanied by Father Whalen, a Catholic priest. Chaos erupts as the two fathers clash over religion and heritage, each determined to annul the marriage.

Still, Abie and Rosemary remain steadfast. They are again married, this time by Father Whalen, with Rabbi Samuels present in a spirit of tolerance and unity. However, their families remain divided, and the young couple are soon isolated, their only support coming from Isaac Cohen and Mrs. Cohen, kindly old friends of the Levy family, as well as Sarah.

On Christmas Eve, the Cohens and Rabbi Samuels persuade Solomon to visit his grandchildren. Meanwhile, Father Whalen encourages Patrick Murphy to do the same. What begins as another confrontation between the two fathers slowly softens into reconciliation when Abie and Rosemary introduce their newborn twins—Patrick Joseph, named after Rosemary's father, and Rebecca, named after Abie's late mother.

Moved by the gesture and the innocence of the children, Solomon and Patrick shake hands at the end . Forgiveness triumphs, love endures, and tolerance brings the divided families together.

== Cast ==
- Charles "Buddy" Rogers as Abie Levy
- Nancy Carroll as Rosemary Murphy
- Jean Hersholt as Solomon Levy
- J. Farrell MacDonald as Patrick Murphy
- Bernard Gorcey as Isaac Cohen
- Ida Kramer as Mrs. Isaac Cohen
- Nick Cogley as Father Whalen
- Camillus Pretal as Rabbi Jacob Samuels
- Rosa Rosanova as Sarah

== Music ==
The film featured a theme song entitled "Rosemary" which was composed by J. S. Zamecnik and Anne Nichols. A song entitled "Little Irish Rose," also by the same composers, was also featured on the soundtrack. Both of these songs are sung by Nancy Carroll in the film. An additional song called "Abie" (by the same composers) is also heard on the soundtrack and is sung by Charles Buddy Rogers.

== Preservation status ==
Only reels 3–6 and 9–12 survive of this film in a silent incomplete copy. There may also be an incomplete copy of reel 8, unverified. All of the surviving reels of the film are held at the Library of Congress in Washington, D.C., and the Vitaphone soundtrack discs for the film still exist complete has been restored by the UCLA Film & Television Archive. The film entered the public domain on January 1, 2024.

== See also ==
- List of early sound feature films (1926–1929)
- The Cohens and Kellys, a 1926 film with a similar plot
- Nichols v. Universal Pictures Corp.
