= John Austin Branch =

Florida politician and lawyer

John Austin Branch (December 2, 1908-?) was a politician in Florida. He served in the Florida House of Representatives and Florida Senate. The Florida Archives have a photo of him.

Born and raised in Tampa, he was admitted to the bar in 1936. He served in the Florida House in 1947 and 1949 He served in the Florida Senate in 1951 and 1953. He represented Hillsborough County. He was a Democrat.
