= Leslie R. Nicholas =

Business Executive

Leslie R. Nicholas Sr.
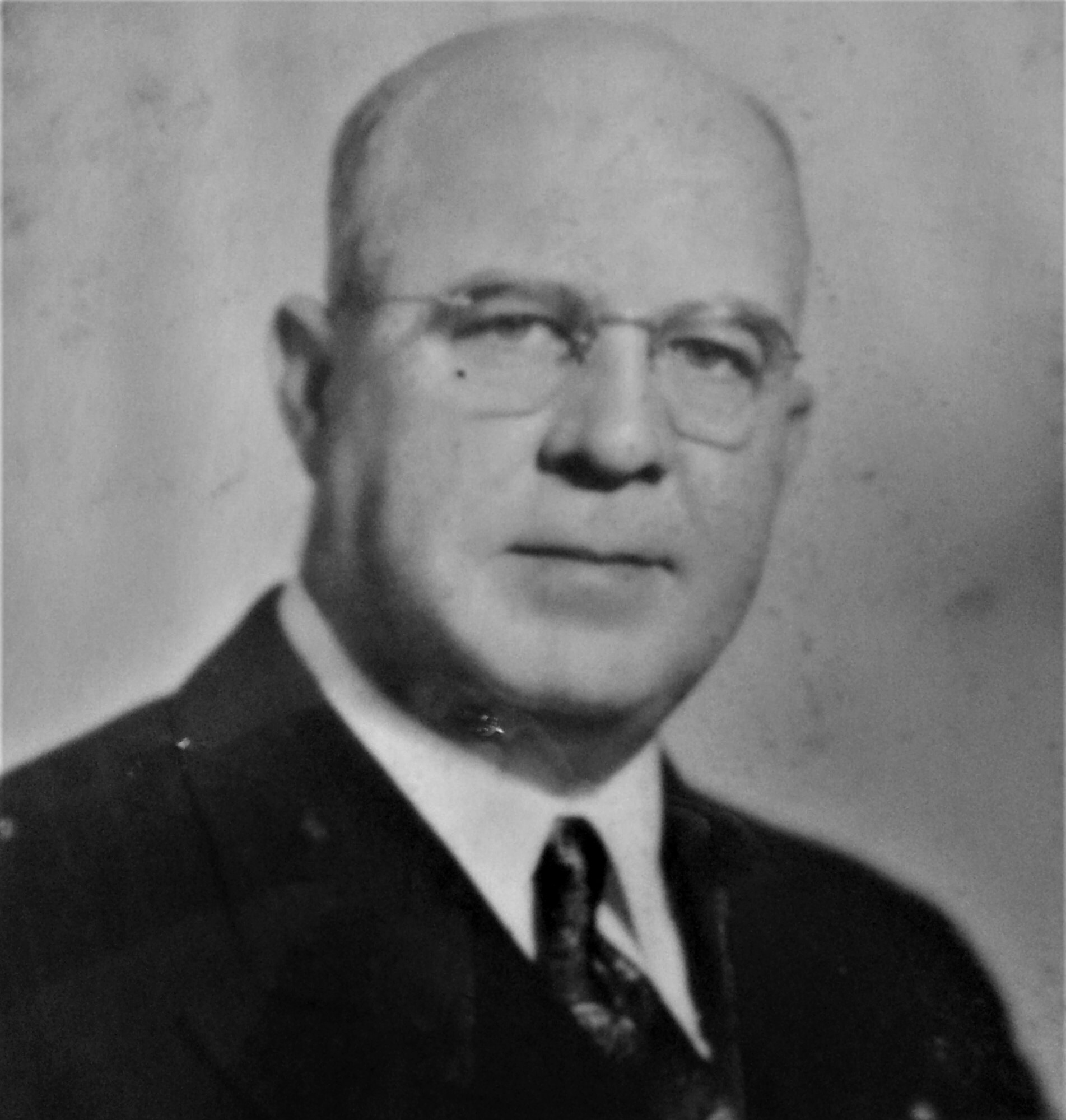
- Nicholas in 1946

Personal details
- Born: Leslie Robinson Nicholas; June 21, 1902 Dales Mill, Georgia
- Died: December 17, 1948 (aged 46) Port Chester, New York
- Resting place: Arlington National Cemetery
- Spouse(s): Sybil Williams (m. 1923; died 1944); Louise Knight (m. 1947)
- Relations: James H. Nicholas (grandfather); Anne Nichols (cousin)
- Children: Leslie Jr.; Henry; Alexander
- Parent(s): Alexander Nicholas; Eva Nicholas
- Education: Georgia Tech (BS)

Military service
- Allegiance: United States of America
- Branch/service: United States Army
- Years of service: 1922–1946
- Rank: Major
- Battles/wars: Pacific War
- Awards: Bronze Star; Silver Star; Purple Heart; Distinguished Flying Cross

Leslie Robinson Nicholas Sr. (June 21, 1902 – December 17, 1948) was an executive for The Guardian Life Insurance Company of America and president of the Nicholas Realty Company. Nicholas was a United States Army major of an anti-aircraft unit in the Pacific War and was one of the most decorated Pacific War veterans from Wayne County, Georgia.

== Early life and career ==
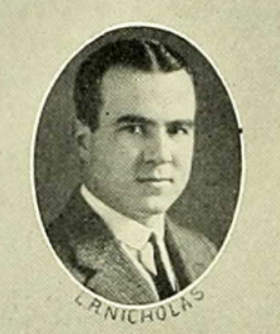
Nicholas at Georgia Tech in 1922.

Leslie "Nick" Nicholas was born on June 21, 1902, in Dales Mill, Wayne County, Georgia, as the only child of Eva Melissa Robinson (1876-1975) and Alexander Stephens Nicholas (1862-1938). His father Alex was one of eight siblings born in 1862 during the American Civil War to farmer James Hamilton Nicholas (1832-1910) the son of Jonathan Nicholas Jr. Anne Nichols, also born in Dales Mill, is the granddaughter of James and cousin of Leslie.

His maternal grandfather James Robinson was a pioneer of Volusia County, Florida, working in real estate, mercantile and agriculture. Nicholas' middle name comes from James Robinson. Nicholas in his youth lived in Waycross, Screven, Jacksonville and White Springs because of his father's profession as a merchant. His father had also attended a military academy in the 1880s which later influenced Nicholas' intentions on attending Gordon College a military school in Barnesville, Georgia. In his youth and throughout his life Nicholas went by the nickname Nick. In 1930 Alex moved to Seville, Florida, where he had a naval store called A.S. Nicholas Company.

In 1919 Nicholas enrolled at Georgia Institute of Technology where he joined the Alpha Kappa Psi, Sigma Phi Epsilon and Phi Kappa Phi fraternities. While at Georgia Tech he was captain of the Reserve Officers' Training Corps in Company D, Glee Club Pianist, an associate editor of the Georgia Tech yearbook and made the honor roll every year. Nicholas graduated in 1922 with a Bachelor of Science in commerce.

=== Insurance and real estate ===
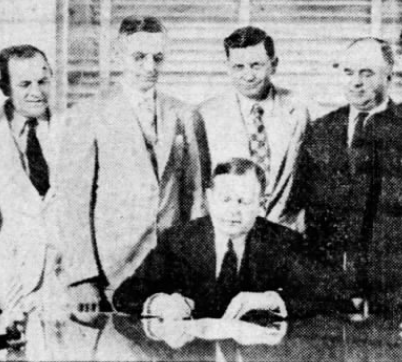
Nicholas, far right, with Governor David Sholtz in 1936.

On November 14, 1923, Nicholas married Sybil Williams in Bulloch County, Georgia, and then relocated to Tampa, Florida. Nicholas pursued a career in real estate called Nicholas Realty Company as president of the company. The Nicholas Realty Company assisted customers with purchasing real estate. The company also owned several properties and would lease them to customers. In 1926 Nicholas leased the Henry-Knight building to Frank Sullivan of Savannah for $100,000. Nicholas was a member of the Tampa Junior Chamber of Commerce being an occasional speaker. Nicholas left the Nicholas Realty Company in the early 1930s to pursue a career in insurance with The Guardian Life Insurance Company of America. Nicholas first joined Guardian Life as a supervisor. In July 1932 Nicholas went to Quebec for an insurance convention to represent Guardian Life Insurance. On May 10, 1936, Nicholas participated in Governor Sholtz's proclamation signing declaring May 11–16 life insurance week.

Nicholas moved to Jacksonville, Florida, ten years later where he continued to work for Guardian Life Insurance at the Barnett National Bank Building. Nicholas had a second son in 1937 but died one day later after he was born. In 1938 his father Alex died from complications of cancer in Jacksonville.

== Military career ==
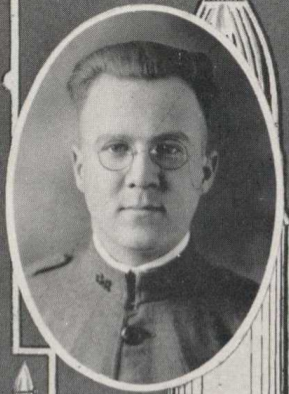
Nicholas at Gordon College in 1919.

In 1917 Nicholas enrolled in Gordon College where he first began training in the military. At Gordon College he was president of the Florida club, president of the Happy Four Club, and secretary and treasurer of the Florida club. Nicholas' rank at Gordon College was First Sergeant of Company B from 1918 to 1919 and then Lieutenant in 1919. Nicholas graduated from Gordon College in 1919. Because Nicholas was 16 years old when he first attended Gordon College he did not have to register for service in World War I due to not meeting the age requirement of 18 years old. Nicholas enlisted in the United States Army Reserve beginning in the early 1920s while pursuing a career in real estate and then insurance. Nicholas was ranked Lt. in the C.A.C. artillery group and regularly gave speeches to fellow active duty reserve members.

=== World War II ===
On February 14, 1942, Nicholas registered for military service as part of the Selective Training and Service Act of 1940 at 39 years old. Nicholas entered active duty on July 20, 1942, and was transferred to Camp Blanding where he became a major of the 117th AAA Group. After serving time at Camp Blanding Major Nicholas was transferred to Camp Stoneman and then to the Pacific to take part in the Pacific War where he was in the United States Army Coast Artillery Corps. During the six month Guadalcanal Campaign Major Nicholas commanded the 117th AAA Group. Artillery groups such as Nicholas' helped ensure an American victory at Guadalcanal where over 8,000 Japanese were killed during the campaign. After Guadalcanal Nicholas and the 117th joined the Bougainville campaign, Battle of Leyte, and the Battle for Cebu City. While Nicholas was in the South Pacific he was wounded at an undisclosed location and later received the Purple Heart.

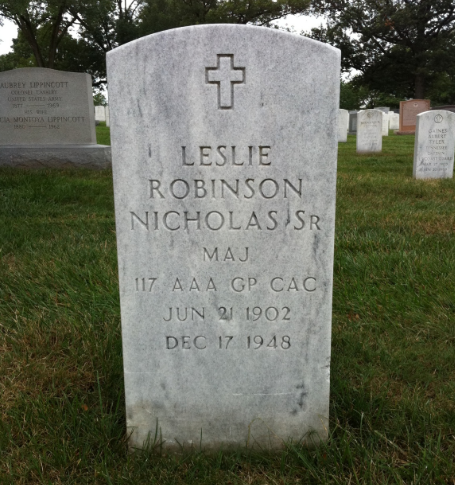
Leslie's grave at Arlington National Cemetery.

On July 30, 1944, Nicholas' wife Sybil died while he was in the South Pacific. His son Leslie Jr. was forced to go to Riverside Military Academy while his father was in the South Pacific. After the academy, Leslie Jr. served in the United States Merchant Marine Cadet Corps for two years as a cadet midshipman. Major Nicholas returned from the war on November 21, 1945, at Camp Blanding.

== Later life and death ==
Nicholas returned to his career in insurance as agency secretary after the war in Jacksonville, Florida. He became the director of the Jacksonville Lions Club and the YMCA. Nicholas met Louise Knight in Jacksonville and they married in 1947. In February 1946 Leslie was given a discharge from the United States Army after serving 20 years. In December 1946 the board of directors at Guardian Life Insurance appointed him as an officer at the home office in New York City. Nicholas directed Guardian Life's field training division to help select candidates for manager positions. In 1947 Nicholas was diagnosed with cancer and gradually declined in health. He most likely developed the previously undiagnosed cancer while serving in the Pacific.

In 1948 Nicholas had a son named after his father Alexander Stephens "Alex" Nicholas in New York City. In that same year on December 17, 1948, Nicholas died at 46 years old in Port Chester, New York. Nicholas was interred at Arlington National Cemetery for his service in the Pacific War.

== Published works ==
Nicholas, L.R. (April 30, 1927) "Now" - is the answer to the Salaried Man's Question - "When?" The Tampa Tribune.
