= Picture Play (magazine) =

American film magazine

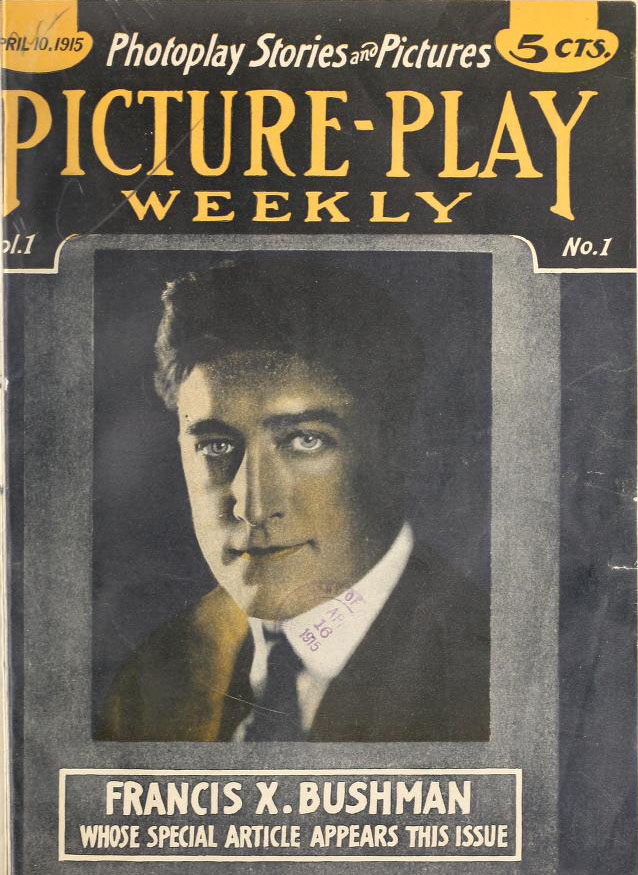
- Cover of the premiere issue (April 10, 1915)
- Categories: Film
- Frequency: Weekly; Monthly
- First issue: April 10, 1915
- Final issue: 1941
- Country: United States
- Based in: New York City
- Language: English

Picture Play, originally titled Picture-Play Weekly was an American weekly magazine focusing on the film industry. Its first edition was published on April 10, 1915. It eventually transitioned from a weekly to a monthly magazine, before ending its production run, when it continued as Your Charm, in March 1941.

== History ==
Picture-Play Weekly began as a weekly magazine on April 10, 1915. By the end of the year it had become a semi-monthly magazine, and its name had changed to Picture-Play Magazine, changed to a monthly format several months later in March 1916. Its next transformation came in May 1927, when it shortened its title and removed the hyphen, taking its final name of Picture Play. Published by Street & Smith, its original editor was Charles Gatchell, who began as a cartoonist, and thereby had a pictorial style. By 1917 it had built up a circulation of over 200,000. Along with Photoplay, Screen Play and Screen Romances, it was one of the more memorable film magazines of the first half of the 20th century.

Picture Play ended its publication run when it continued as Your Charm, “The Magazine for Moderns,” in March 1941.
