= Abie's Irish Rose =

1922 comedy by Anne Nichols

- Both the Broadway play and the radio series were highlighted in this poster for the 1946 film.
- Written by: Anne Nichols
- Original language: English
- Genre: Comedy
- Setting: New York

Premiere
- Date premiered: May 23, 1922
- Place premiered: Fulton Theatre; New York City

Abie's Irish Rose is a popular comedy by Anne Nichols, which premiered in 1922. Initially a Broadway play, it has become familiar through repeated stage productions, films and radio programs. The basic premise involves an Irish Catholic girl and a young Jewish man who marry despite the objections of their families.

== Theater and films ==
Although it initially received poor reviews—with the notable exception of The New York Times, which reviewed it favorably—the Broadway play was a commercial hit, running for 2,327 performances between May 23, 1922, and October 1, 1927. At the time, this was the longest run in Broadway theater history, surpassing the record 1,291 performances set by the Winchell Smith and Frank Bacon 1918 play, Lightnin'. The show's touring company had a similarly long run and held the record for longest-running touring company for nearly 40 years, until that record was broken by Hello, Dolly! in the 1960s. The touring company's male lead was future Hollywood star George Brent, in his first major role; the female lead was Peggy Parry.

Abie's Irish Rose was revived on Broadway in 1937 and again, in an updated version, in 1954.

The play inspired two films. The first, released in 1928, stars Charles "Buddy" Rogers and Nancy Carroll, directed by Victor Fleming. A 1946 version stars Richard Norris and Joanne Dru, directed by A. Edward Sutherland and produced by Bing Crosby. The 1946 film was severely criticized for being at best, outdated, and at worst defamatory.

The premise was widely imitated, and Anne Nichols sued one imitator, Universal Pictures, which produced The Cohens and Kellys, a motion picture play about an Irish boy who marries a Jewish girl from feuding families. However, in Nichols v. Universal Pictures Corp., the United States Court of Appeals for the Second Circuit found for the defendant, holding that copyright protection cannot be extended to the characteristics of stock characters in a story, whether it be a book, play or film.

== Radio ==
A weekly NBC radio series, Abie's Irish Rose, replaced Knickerbocker Playhouse and ran from January 24, 1942, through September 2, 1944. Faced with listener protests about its stereotyped ethnic portrayals, the radio series was cancelled in 1945. Nichols wrote the scripts. Axel Gruenbert and Joe Rines directed the cast, which starred Richard Bond, Sydney Smith, Richard Coogan and Clayton "Bud" Collyer as Abie Levy. Betty Winkler, Mercedes McCambridge, Julie Stevens, Bernard Gorcey, and Marion Shockley portrayed Rosemary Levy. Solomon Levy was played by Alfred White, Charlie Cantor and Alan Reed.

Others in the radio cast include: Charme Allen (as Mrs. Mueller), Richard Gordon, Roger DeKoven and Martin Wolfson (Rabbi Samuels, aka Dr. Samuels), Walter Kinsella (Patrick Murphy), Menasha Skulnik (Isaac Cohen), Anna Appel (Mrs. Cohen), Ann Thomas (Casey), Bill Adams (Father Whelan), Amanda Randolph (maid) and Dolores Gillenas (the Levys' twins). The announcer was Howard Petrie, and Joe Stopak provided the music. The opening theme music was "My Wild Irish Rose" by Chauncey Olcott.

== Plot ==
Nichols' original Broadway play has the couple meeting in France during World War I. The young man is a wounded soldier and the girl a nurse who tended him. The priest and the rabbi from the wedding are veterans of the same war, and recognize one another from their time in the service.

The rest of the plot was summarized by Judge Learned Hand in his opinion on the copyright lawsuit filed by Nichols:

Abie's Irish Rose presents a Jewish family living in prosperous circumstances in New York. The father, a widower, is in business as a merchant, in which his son and only child helps him. The boy has philandered with young women, who to his father's great disgust have always been Gentiles, for he is obsessed with a passion that his daughter-in-law shall be an orthodox Jewess. When the play opens the son, who has been courting a young Irish Catholic girl, has already married her secretly before a Protestant minister, and is concerned to soften the blow for his father, by securing a favorable impression of his bride, while concealing her faith and race. To accomplish this he introduces her to his father at his home as a Jewess, and lets it appear that he is interested in her, though he conceals the marriage. The girl somewhat reluctantly falls in with the plan; the father takes the bait, becomes infatuated with the girl, concludes that they must marry, and assumes that of course they will, if he so decides. He calls in a rabbi, and prepares for the wedding according to the Jewish rite.

Meanwhile the girl's father, also a widower, who lives in California, and is as intense in his own religious antagonism as the Jew, has been called to New York, supposing that his daughter is to marry an Irishman and a Catholic. Accompanied by a priest, he arrives at the house at the moment when the marriage is being celebrated, but too late to prevent it, and the two fathers, each infuriated by the proposed union of his child to a heretic, fall into unseemly and grotesque antics. The priest and the rabbi become friendly, exchange trite sentiments about religion, and agree that the match is good. Apparently out of abundant caution, the priest celebrates the marriage for a third time, while the girl's father is inveigled away. The second act closes with each father, still outraged, seeking to find some way by which the union, thus trebly insured, may be dissolved.

The last act takes place about a year later, the young couple having meanwhile been abjured by each father, and left to their own resources. They have had twins, a boy and a girl, but their fathers know no more than that a child has been born. At Christmas each, led by his craving to see his grandchild, goes separately to the young folks' home, where they encounter each other, each laden with gifts, one for a boy, the other for a girl. After some slapstick comedy, depending upon the insistence of each that he is right about the sex of the grandchild, they become reconciled when they learn the truth, and that each child is to bear the given name of a grandparent. The curtain falls as the fathers are exchanging amenities, and the Jew giving evidence of an abatement in the strictness of his orthodoxy.

There have been some variations of the plot, as to setting, or how the characters meet, in later versions of the play or in adaptations for film.

== Critical response ==
Although the play was a tremendous popular success, it was almost universally loathed by the critics. Robert Benchley, then the theatre critic for Life magazine, nursed a particular hatred for it. Part of Benchley's job was to write capsule reviews each week. He described Abie's Irish Rose variously as "Something Awful", "Just about as low as good clean fun can get", "Showing that the Jews and the Irish crack equally old jokes", "The comic spirit of 1876", "People laugh at this every night, which explains why democracy can never be a success", "Will the Marines never come?" and finally "Hebrews 13:8," a Biblical passage that reads, “Jesus Christ, the same yesterday, and today, and forever.” He also held a contest for an outsider to contribute the capsule review, which Harpo Marx won with "No worse than a bad cold."

In a generally favorable review, the New York Times noted the positive audience response, and closed with: “Personally, we hope to be present at little Rebecca Rachel and Patrick Joseph Levy's second birthday, if not their Hudson-Fulton centennial.”

Writing in The New Yorker about the 1937 revival, Wolcott Gibbs said that "it had, in fact, the rather eerie quality of a repeated nightmare; the one, perhaps, in which I always find myself in an old well, thick with bats, and can't get out."

The Anti-Defamation League protested the use of Jewish stereotypes in the 1946 film version, claiming it "will reinforce, if it does not actually create, greater doubt and keener misconceptions, as well as outright prejudice."

Reflecting on the play's message of social tolerance, Brooks Atkinson wrote about the 1954 revival, "What was a comic strip joke in 1922 is a serious problem today. Every now and then Abie's Irish Rose strikes a sensitive chord. For good will is in shorter supply now than it was thirty-two years ago."

Contemporary scholar Jordan Schildcrout reads Abie's Irish Rose in relation to rising anxieties about immigration during the 1920s, as well as to current events such as the establishment of the Irish Free State (1921), the British Mandate for Palestine (1922), and the restrictive Immigration Act of 1924. He writes, "In an era when anti-Jewish and anti-Irish sentiments were prominent, the play's representation of ethnic pride might have empowered audiences, while also offering them a happy fantasy of belonging and becoming increasingly 'American,' and therefore not subject to the old prejudices and ethnic rivalries."

== Cultural references ==
Lorenz Hart expressed the feeling of many in the theater world in these lines for "Manhattan": "Our future babies we'll take to Abie's Irish Rose—I hope they'll live to see it close."

The play was popular enough for its title to be referenced in a pun in the Marx Brothers film Animal Crackers, (Note: Groucho: "We go to court and get a writ of habeas corpus." Chico: "You gonna get rid of what?" Groucho: "Haven’t you ever heard of habeas corpus?" Chico: "No, but I've heard of 'Habie's Irish Rose.' " Groucho sighs in exasperation and walks away.) in the lyrics of the Cole Porter song "Ace in the Hole", the Stephen Sondheim song "I'm Still Here", and the song "The Legacy" from the musical On the Twentieth Century.

== Thematic legacy ==
Abie's Irish Rose prefigured the comedy of Stiller and Meara (Jerry Stiller and Anne Meara), a husband-and-wife comedy team popular in the 1960s and 1970s who often spiked their routines with references to their different backgrounds (Stiller was Jewish; Meara was of an Irish Catholic background but converted to Judaism later during their marriage).

The play also provided the central premise for the 1972–1973 television series Bridget Loves Bernie (CBS), starring Meredith Baxter and David Birney (who later married in real life) in a socio-economic reversal of Abie's Irish Rose: Birney plays struggling young Jewish cab driver/aspiring playwright Bernie Steinberg, whose parents run a modest family delicatessen, and Baxter plays Bridget Fitzgerald, the Irish Catholic daughter of wealthy parents, who falls in love with and elopes with Steinberg to the disappointment of both sets of parents. (Both actors were Protestant.) The show was attacked by a broad range of Jewish groups for allegedly promoting inter-faith marriage, and it was cancelled at the end of its first season, despite being the fifth-highest-rated series of the 1972–1973 year on USA broadcast television.

Two decades later, with social attitudes changing in the U.S., CBS ran another television series, Brooklyn Bridge (1991–1993), the quasi-autobiographical childhood memoir of its Jewish creator, Gary David Goldberg. It features a continuing romance between two teenage characters, a Jewish boy and an Irish Catholic girl. It ran two seasons, and the sixth (two-part) episode of the first season, titled War of the Worlds, explores the tensions of this inter-faith relationship in its fictional mid-1950s Brooklyn setting. Goldberg previously created another quasi-autobiographical television series, Family Ties, inspired by his adult life, in which the female lead, the alter-ego of his real-life Irish Catholic partner, is portrayed by Meredith Baxter, the actress who starred in the ill-fated Bridget Loves Bernie.

== See also ==
- The Cohens and Kellys

== Notes ==
Preceded by Lightnin'	Longest-running Broadway show 1925–1939	Succeeded by Tobacco Road
