= Frank Bacon (actor) =

American actor and dramatist

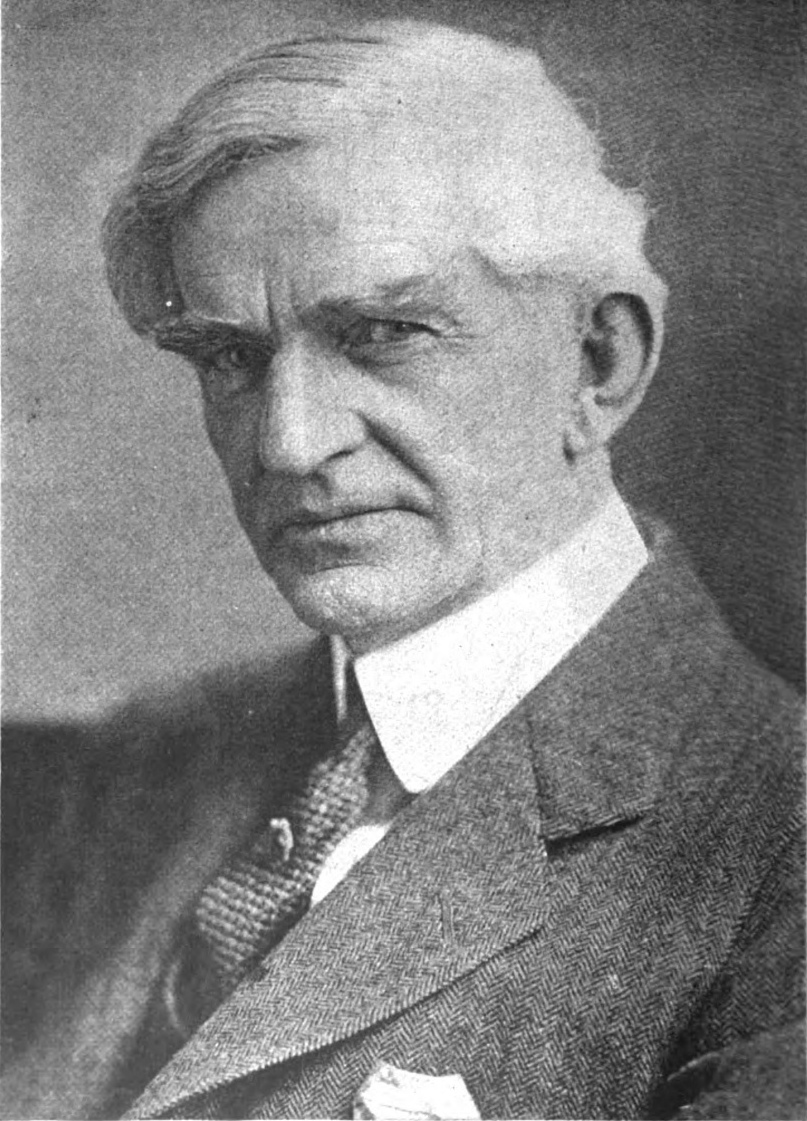
- Born: Frank Wilford Bacon; January 16, 1864 near Yuba City, California, U.S.
- Died: November 19, 1922 (aged 58); Chicago, Illinois, U.S.
- Occupation: Actor-Playwright
- Spouse: Jennie Weidman
- Children: Lloyd Bacon

Frank Bacon (January 16, 1864 – November 19, 1922), was an American character actor and playwright who after years of relative obscurity achieved great success as he entered the twilight of his career. The 1918 play Lightnin', which Bacon co-wrote and starred in, set a Broadway record for the day of 1,291 performances and was still going strong on tour after more than 700 shows when Bacon was forced to bow out due to fatigue. His death from a heart attack followed a week later.

== Early life ==
Bacon was born on his parents’ farm about five miles west of Yuba City, California, not far from Bogue Station on the old Southern Pacific Railroad line. His parents, Lehella Jane McGrew and Lyddall Bacon, came from Kentucky and were married at Prairie City on October 2, 1853 by the Rev. Alex Graham in a double ceremony with Sarah Emma McGrew and E. H. Heacock.

Bacon was raised in San Jose where he attended school before dropping out in his early teens to work at a nearby sheep ranch. At around the age of 17 Bacon became a photographer’s apprentice and with a brother would eventually open his own studio in San Jose. After several years he abandoned photography for newspaper work and became an advertising agent for the San Jose Mercury. A few years later he purchased The Napa Reporter and not long afterwards founded The Mountain View Register.

== Stage ==
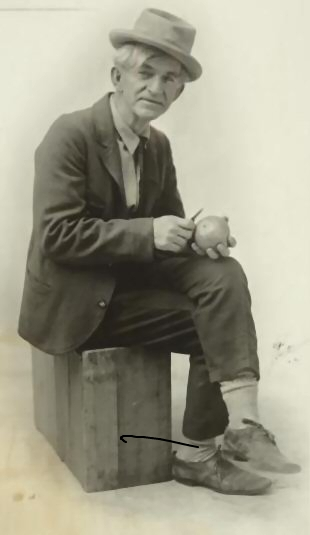
Bacon as Lightnin' Bill Jones

After a failed foray into politics and growing disenchantment with the newspaper business, Bacon chose to “turn respectable” and joined a San Jose stock company. By 1894 he was a member of a dramatic company with D. K. Higgins and Georgia Waldron playing the villain in Higgins’ melodrama, The Plunger. He later formed a small company with his wife and a few other actors and toured mostly California venues for a number of seasons. During this period, eight-year-old Roscoe Arbuckle made his stage debut with Bacon's company at Santa Ana, California.

Bacon was a member of the repertoire company at the Alcazar Theatre for many years and only left after the theatre fell victim to the 1906 San Francisco earthquake. Afterwards he became a popular comedian at Oakland's Ye Liberty Playhouse and toured with theatrical and vaudeville companies. Bacon made his Broadway debut at the Gaiety Theatre in December 1912 playing Papa Carr in Carlyle Moore’s long running comedy, Stop Thief. In late 1914, Bacon played Hiram Higgins at the Astor Theatre in George M. Cohan’s moderate success, The Miracle Man (from the novel by Frank L. Packard) and, over the first seven months of 1916, he scored a hit at the Hudson Theatre as Jerry Primrose, The Shebear’s Servant, in the Edward Childs Carpenter drama, The Cinderella Man.

=== Lightnin' ===
Lightnin’ was a comedy that Bacon had worked on for a number of years before its final incarnation debuted at the Gaiety Theatre on August 26, 1918. The play, originally titled A House Divided, is about Lightnin’ Bill Jones, a "lovable old liar" not known for his swiftness of foot. In 2007, Ethan Mordden described the character: "the uneducated rustic, innocent of fancy fashion, who somehow gets the better of popinjays and rogues... as slow as paste [with a] low-key yet fierce sense of independence... Lightnin' has wife troubles, money troubles, and to every question a set of deadpan retorts that exasperate all those in the vicinity."

The play was first produced as one-act plays in tours following the San Francisco earthquake. The play was revised a number of times, the last with the help of writer Winchell Smith. Bacon had sold the film rights to his play; Smith, seeing the potential in the concept, advised Bacon to buy the rights back. The two became partners after Smith saw Bacon in Cinderella Man and proposed they work together on some future project. Bacon suggested A House Divided, Smith agreed, and soon what began as a two-week rewrite grew to take in the better part of two years. The resulting play ran on Broadway for three years, almost twice as long as any production to that point (Peg O' My Heart had run for twenty months in 1912-13). Playing the lead role, Bacon was so obsessive about the play's success that he spent his few days off in the theater, watching his understudy in the part. By all accounts, Bacon had a laconic, casual style of underplaying that was unusual and connected with audiences.

At the close of the record run of Lightnin’, U. S. President Harding sent the playwrights a letter of congratulations, which was read aloud onstage by his Secretary of Labor. The following day, as the play left for its long road tour, Mayor Hylan and the New York City Police Band headed by composer Victor Herbert accompanied the troupe to Penn Station where Bernard Baruch presented Bacon and Smith with the World Championship Belt of the Playwriting and Producing World.

== Cinema ==
John Ford adapted Lightnin' as a silent film in 1925 with veteran actor and director Jay Hunt taking the part of Lightnin' Bill Jones. Five years later in an early talkie, Will Rogers played Jones opposite Louise Dresser and Joel McCrea.

Between 1915 and 1916 Bacon appeared in four films, The Silent Voice, from the play by Jules Eckert Goodman; Rosemary, from a play by Lois N. Parker and Murray Carson; Her Debt of Honor, from a scenario by William Nigh; and A Corner in Cotton, from a story by Anita Loos.

== Personal life ==
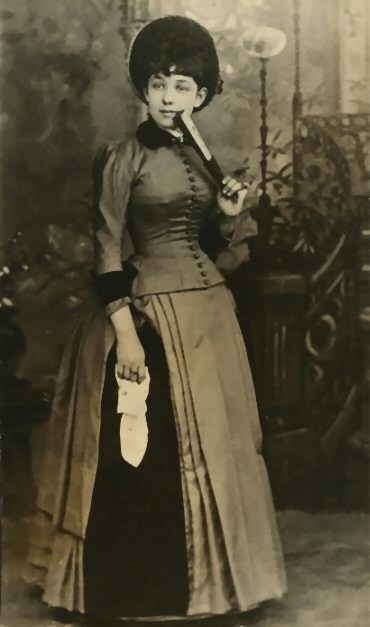
Jennie Weidman, actress wife of Frank Bacon

On June 27, 1885, Bacon married actress Jennie Weidman, whom he had known since grammar school. Their daughter, Bessie Bacon Allen (1886–1952), became an actress and writer, and their son, Lloyd Bacon, a Hollywood director.

== Death ==
Bacon died at the Hotel Del Prado, Chicago where he had gone after his final performance of Lightnin’ at the Blackstone Theatre to be under the care of his friend, Dr. Robert A. Black.

Bacon’s manager later said of the actor:

A kindly man, of simple tastes, who gave much to the public that he served and asked little in return. Bacon was known to his friends in the profession as much for the big, human man he was as for his sterling qualities as an actor. He really died the Saturday night he gave his last performance – and his greatest. George Kingsbury, 1922

Bacon was laid to rest at Oak Woods Cemetery after a brief Christian Science service and eulogy by Judge Kenesaw Landis. The pallbearers were drawn from the cast of Lightnin'. The family eventually dropped a plan to someday remove Bacon's remains to a cemetery nearer his birthplace.
