= Louise Dresser =

American actress (1878–1965)

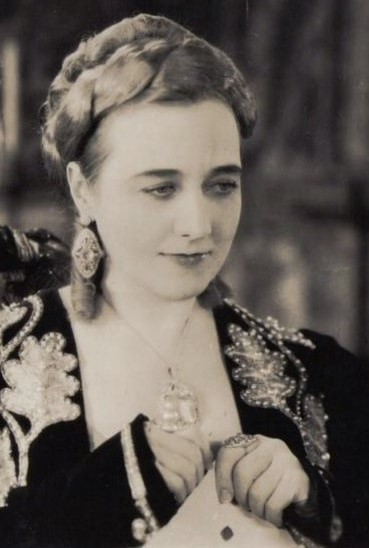
- Dresser in The Eagle (1925)
- Born: Louise Josephine Kerlin; October 5, 1878; Evansville, Indiana, U.S.
- Died: April 24, 1965 (aged 86); Woodland Hills, California, U.S.
- Resting place: Forest Lawn Memorial Park Cemetery, Glendale, California
- Occupation: Actress
- Years active: 1900–1937
- Spouses: Jack Norworth (m. 1898; div. 1908) Jack Gardner (m. 1910; died 1950)

Louise Dresser (born Louise Josephine Kerlin; October 5, 1878 – April 24, 1965) was an American actress. She is perhaps best known for her roles in the many films in which she played the wife of Will Rogers, including State Fair and David Harum.

== Early life ==
Louise Josephine Kerlin was born on October 5, 1878, in Evansville, Indiana to Ida (née Shaffer) and William S. Kerlin, a railroad engineer who died when she was 15 years old. She had a younger brother, William Lambert Kerlin.

== Career ==
Dresser took her professional last name from Paul Dresser, who was a friend of her father. Upon finding out Louise was William Kerlin's daughter, he launched her as his younger sister, and she took on his last name. Many people believed the two were related, and when Paul died, Louise was mentioned in his obituary as a surviving relative.

Dresser worked as a burlesque dancer and a singer at the Boston dime museum and then made her vaudeville debut in 1900. She formed a team named "Louise Dresser and Her Picks", a singing act that was backed by a chorus of African-American children. In 1906, she began to play New York vaudeville stages, and that year, she was in the musical About Town with Lew Fields, which was a hit. The following year, she was in the hit show Girl Behind the Counter, which ran for 260 performances.

After vaudeville, Dresser's success continued on Broadway, where she starred with De Wolf Hopper in Matinee Idol (1910–1912), and appeared in Broadway to Paris (1912), Potash and Perlmutter (1913), and Hello Broadway! (1914). Her final Broadway show was Have a Heart (1917), which received good reviews.

Dresser made her film debut in The Glory of Clementina (1922), and her first starring role was in The City That Never Sleeps (1924). In 1925, she starred in The Eagle, opposite Rudolph Valentino and Vilma Bánky as Catherine the Great, and played the title role in The Goose Woman, alongside Jack Pickford.

During the first presentations of the Academy Awards in 1929, Dresser was nominated for the Academy Award for Best Actress for A Ship Comes In.

In 1930, she acted as Al Jolson's mother in Mammy, and she portrayed Empress Elizabeth in The Scarlet Empress (1934). Her last film was Maid of Salem (1937). On television, she appeared in an episode spotlighting Buster Keaton on Ralph Edwards's program This Is Your Life. She had known Keaton since he was a small boy with his parents in vaudeville.

== Later years ==
After retiring in 1937, Dresser worked as a volunteer at the Motion Picture & Television Country House and Hospital.

In 1950, Dresser attempted to make a comeback, but she was unable to get any screen roles, which she blamed on rumors of her being deaf.

== Personal life ==
Dresser was married twice. Her first marriage was to singer/songwriter Jack Norworth, whom she married in 1898.

She then wed Jack Gardner in 1910, and they remained together until his death in 1950. Neither union produced any children.

Dresser died in Woodland Hills, California after surgery for an intestinal ailment. She had lost much of her fortune trying to establish a racing stable. Her gravesite is at Forest Lawn Memorial Park Cemetery, Glendale, California.

== Filmography ==
Silent

| Year | Title | Role | Notes |
|---|---|---|---|
| 1922 | The Glory of Clementina | Lena Fontaine | Lost film |
| 1922 | Burning Sands | Kate Bindane | Lost film |
| 1922 | Enter Madame | Mrs. Flora Preston | |
| 1923 | The Fog | Mrs. Theddon | Lost film |
| 1923 | Prodigal Daughters | Mrs. Forbes | Lost film |
| 1923 | Salomy Jane | Mrs. Pete | Lost film |
| 1923 | Ruggles of Red Gap | Mrs. Effie Floud | Lost film |
| 1923 | Woman-Proof | Wilma Rockwood | Lost film |
| 1923 | To the Ladies | Mrs. Kincaid | Lost film |
| 1924 | The Next Corner | Nina Race | Lost film |
| 1924 | What Shall I Do? | Mrs. McLean | Lost film |
| 1924 | The City That Never Sleeps | Mother O'Day | Lost film |
| 1924 | Cheap Kisses | Jane Dillingham | Lost film |
| 1925 | Percy | Mrs. Rogers | Lost film |
| 1925 | Enticement | Mrs. Samuel Murray | Lost film |
| 1925 | The Goose Woman | Marie de Nardi / Mary Holmes | |
| 1925 | The Eagle | The Czarina | |
| 1926 | Fifth Avenue | Claudine Kemp | Lost film |
| 1926 | The Blind Goddess | Mrs. Eileen Clayton | Lost film |
| 1926 | Padlocked | Mrs. Alcott | |
| 1926 | Broken Hearts of Hollywood | Virginia Perry | |
| 1926 | Gigolo | Julia Gory | |
| 1926 | Everybody's Acting | Anastasia Potter | Lost film |
| 1926 | The Third Degree | Alicia Daly | |
| 1927 | White Flannels | Mrs. Jacob Politz | Lost film |
| 1927 | Mr. Wu | Mrs. Gregory | |
| 1928 | A Ship Comes In | Mrs. Pleznik | Nomination - Academy Award for Best Actress |
| 1928 | The Garden of Eden | Rosa | |

Sound

| Year | Title | Role | Notes |
|---|---|---|---|
| 1928 | Mother Knows Best | Ma Quail | Fox's first full talkie Lost film |
| 1928 | The Air Circus | Mrs. Blake | |
| 1929 | Not Quite Decent | Mame Jarrow | Lost film |
| 1929 | Madonna of Avenue A | Georgia Morton | Lost film |
| 1930 | Mammy | Mother Fuller | |
| 1930 | The Three Sisters | Marta | Lost film |
| 1930 | This Mad World | Pauline Parisot - Paul's Mother | |
| 1930 | Lightnin' | Mrs. Mary Jones | |
| 1931 | Caught | Calamity Jane | |
| 1932 | Stepping Sisters | Mrs. Cissie Ramsey née Black | |
| 1933 | State Fair | Melissa Frake | |
| 1933 | Song of the Eagle | Emma Hoffman | |
| 1933 | Doctor Bull | Mrs. Herbert Banning | |
| 1933 | Cradle Song | Prioress | |
| 1934 | David Harum | Polly Harum | |
| 1934 | The Scarlet Empress | Empress Elizabeth Petrovna | |
| 1934 | The World Moves On | Baroness von Gerhardt | |
| 1934 | Servants' Entrance | Mrs. Hansen | |
| 1934 | A Girl of the Limberlost | Katherine Comstock | |
| 1934 | Hollywood on Parade | | Short subject |
| 1935 | The County Chairman | Mrs. Rigby | |
| 1937 | Maid of Salem | Ellen Clarke - Barbara's Aunt | |
