= Walter Pidgeon =

Canadian-American actor (1897–1984)

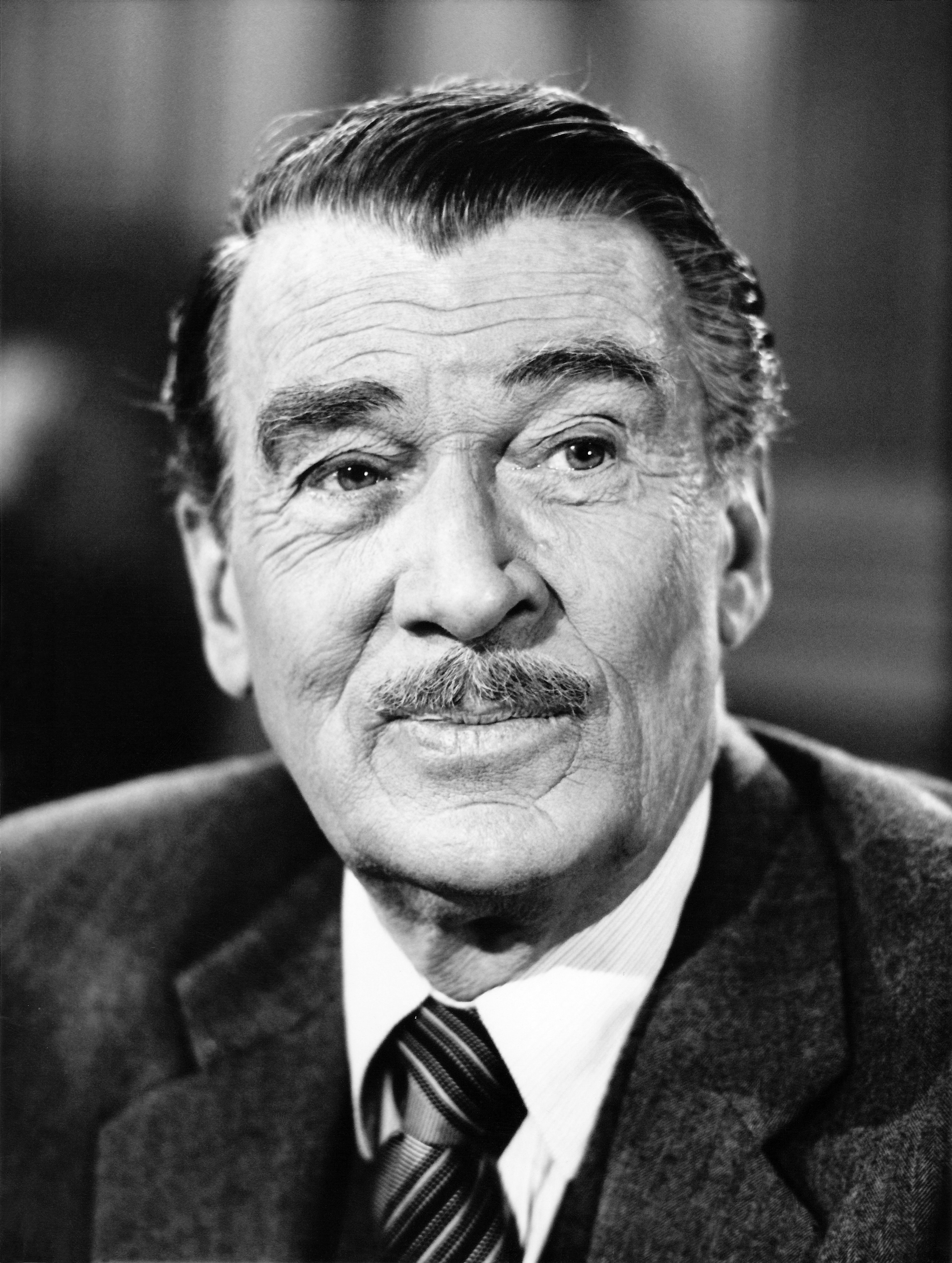
- Pidgeon on Perry Mason (1963)
- Born: Walter Davis Pidgeon; September 23, 1897; Saint John, New Brunswick, Canada
- Died: September 25, 1984 (aged 87); Santa Monica, California, U.S.
- Citizenship: British subject; United States (from 1943)
- Education: University of New Brunswick; Boston Conservatory of Music
- Occupation: Actor
- Years active: 1925–1977
- Political party: Republican
- Spouses: Edna Muriel Pickles (m. 1919; died 1921) Ruth Walker (m. 1931)
- Children: 1
- Military career
- Allegiance: Canada
- Branch: Army
- Service years: 1914-1919
- Rank: Lieutenant
- Units: 65th Battery, Royal Regiment of Canadian Artillery
- Conflicts: World War I

President of the Screen Actors Guild
- In office 1952–1957
- Preceded by: Ronald Reagan
- Succeeded by: Leon Ames

Walter Davis Pidgeon (September 23, 1897 – September 25, 1984) was a Canadian-American actor. A major leading man during the Golden Age of Hollywood, known for his "portrayals of men who prove both sturdy and wise," Pidgeon earned two Academy Award nominations for Best Actor for his roles in Mrs. Miniver (1942) and Madame Curie (1943).

Pidgeon also starred in many other notable films such as How Green Was My Valley (1941), The Bad and the Beautiful (1952), Forbidden Planet (1956), Executive Suite (1954), Voyage to the Bottom of the Sea (1961), Advise & Consent (1962), Funny Girl (1968) and Harry in Your Pocket (1973).

Pidgeon also served as the 10th president of the Screen Actors Guild between 1952 and 1957. He received the Guild's Life Achievement Award in 1975 and a star on the Hollywood Walk of Fame in 1960 for his contributions to the film industry.

== Early life and education ==
Pidgeon was born in Saint John, New Brunswick, the son of Hannah (née Sanborn), a housewife, and Caleb Burpee Pidgeon, a haberdasher.

Pidgeon received his formal education in local schools and at the University of New Brunswick, where he studied law and drama. His university education was interrupted by World War I, when he volunteered with the 65th Battery as a lieutenant in the Royal Regiment of Canadian Artillery. He never saw action, and some sources indicate that he was severely injured in an accident when he was crushed between two gun carriages and spent 17 months in a military hospital. His medical records suggest that his active service was ended by a hernia.

Following the war, he moved to Boston, Massachusetts, where he worked as a bank runner, at the same time studying voice at the Boston Conservatory.

== Career ==
While he was performing in amateur theatricals in Boston, Pidgeon was hired by producer, actress and singer Elsie Janis, who was seeking a male singer for her revue. Pidgeon moved to New York City in 1923, where he was interviewed by E.E. Clive, a British producer working on Broadway. Pidgeon made his featured Broadway debut in Janis' 1925 revue Puzzles of 1925. Clive was producing You Never Can Tell, and he cast Pidgeon in a supporting role despite Pidgeon's lack of theatrical experience.

Pidgeon's success created a rift with Janis, causing Pidgeon's dismissal and his move to Hollywood. His first role was in the silent film Mannequin (1925). Discouraged with the quality of the roles assigned to him, Pidgeon returned to New York in 1928 to resume his stage career. With the advent of sound films, Pidgeon starred in the musicals Bride of the Regiment (1930), Sweet Kitty Bellairs (1930), Viennese Nights (1930) and Kiss Me Again (1931). In 1935, he appeared on Broadway in Something Gay, Night of January 16th and There's Wisdom in Women.

Pidgeon returned to film in 1937 as a dramatic actor in Saratoga (1937), The Girl of the Golden West (1938) and Dark Command (1940).

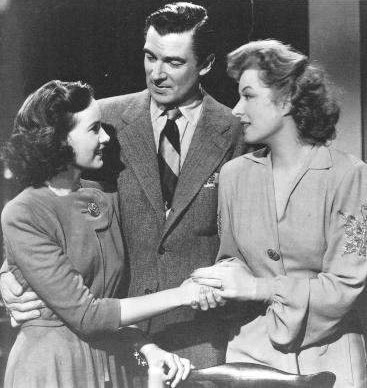
Pidgeon with Teresa Wright and Greer Garson in Mrs. Miniver (1942)

In 1941, Pidgeon starred in the Academy Award-winning Best Picture How Green Was My Valley (1941). He starred with Greer Garson in Blossoms in the Dust (1941), Mrs. Miniver (1942) (for which he was nominated for the Academy Award for Best Actor) and its sequel, The Miniver Story (1950). He was also nominated for Madame Curie (1943), again with Garson. His partnership with Garson continued throughout the 1940s and into the 1950s with Mrs. Parkington (1944), Julia Misbehaves (1948), That Forsyte Woman (1949) and Scandal at Scourie (1953). He also starred as Chip Collyer in the comedy Week-End at the Waldorf (1945) and later as Colonel Michael S. 'Hooky' Nicobar in The Red Danube (1949).

Although he continued to make films, including The Bad and the Beautiful (1952), Executive Suite (1954) and Forbidden Planet (1956), by the mid-1950s Pidgeon returned to work on Broadway after a 20-year absence. He was featured in the musical Take Me Along with Jackie Gleason and received a Tony Award nomination. He continued making films, playing Admiral Harriman Nelson in 1961's Voyage to the Bottom of the Sea, James Haggin in Walt Disney's Big Red (1962) and the Senate majority leader in Otto Preminger's Advise & Consent. His role as Florenz Ziegfeld in Funny Girl (1968) was well-received and he played Casey, James Coburn's sidekick, in Harry in Your Pocket (1973).

Pidgeon guest-starred on the episode "King of the Valley" of Dick Powell's Zane Grey Theatre, which aired on November 26, 1959. His other television credits included Rawhide ("The Reunion", 1962). Breaking Point, The F.B.I., Marcus Welby, M.D. and Gibbsville. In 1963 he guest-starred as corporate attorney Sherman Hatfield in the final of four special episodes of Perry Mason while Raymond Burr was recovering from surgery. In 1965, he played the king in Rodgers and Hammerstein's CBS television production of Cinderella, starring Lesley Ann Warren. Pidgeon retired from acting in 1977.

== Politics ==
A Republican, Pidgeon joined celebrity Republicans in 1944 at a rally in the Los Angeles Memorial Coliseum, arranged by David O. Selznick, to support the national ticket of Thomas E. Dewey and John W. Bricker and Governor Earl Warren of California, who would be Dewey's running mate in 1948. The gathering drew 93,000, with Cecil B. DeMille as the master of ceremonies and short speeches by Hedda Hopper and Walt Disney.

== Personal life ==
In 1919, Pidgeon wed Edna Muriel Pickles, who died during the birth of their daughter Edna (1921–1978). In 1931, Pidgeon married his secretary Ruth Walker, to whom he remained married until his death.

Pidgeon became a United States citizen on December 24, 1943.

== Death ==
Pidgeon died on September 25, 1984, in Santa Monica, California, following a series of strokes.

Pidgeon has a star on the Hollywood Walk of Fame at 6414 Hollywood Boulevard.

== Complete filmography ==
Year	Film	Role	Director	Notes
1926	Mannequin	Martin Innesbrook	James Cruze	
1926	The Outsider	Basil Owen	Rowland V. Lee	Lost film
1926	Old Loves and New	Clyde Lord Geradine	Maurice Tourneur	Lost film
1926	Miss Nobody	Bravo	Lambert Hillyer	Lost film
1926	Marriage License?	Paul	Frank Borzage	
1927	The Heart of Salome	Monte Carroll	Victor Schertzinger	Lost film
1927	The Girl from Rio	Paul Sinclair	Tom Terriss	
1927	The Thirteenth Juror	Richard Marsden	Edward Laemmle	
1927	The Gorilla	Stevens	Alfred Santell	
1928	The Gateway of the Moon	Arthur Wyatt	John Griffith Wray	Lost film
1928	Woman Wise	United States Consul	Albert Ray	Lost film
1928	Turn Back the Hours	Philip Drake	Howard Bretherton	
1928	Clothes Make the Woman	Victor Trent	Tom Terriss	
1928	Melody of Love	Jack Clark	Arch Heath	Lost film
1929	The Voice Within			
1929	Her Private Life	Ned Thayer	Alexander Korda	
1929	A Most Immoral Lady	Tony Williams	John Griffith Wray	
1930	Showgirl in Hollywood	Himself – Premiere Emcee	Mervyn LeRoy	Uncredited
1930	Bride of the Regiment	Col. Vultow	John Francis Dillon	Lost film
1930	Sweet Kitty Bellairs	Lord Varney	Alfred E. Green	
1930	The Gorilla	Arthur Marsden	Bryan Foy	Lost film
1930	Viennese Nights	Franz von Renner	Alan Crosland	
1930	Going Wild	'Ace' Benton	William A. Seiter	
1931	Kiss Me Again	Paul de St. Cyr	William A. Seiter	
1931	The Hot Heiress	Clay	Clarence G. Badger	
1932	Rockabye	Al Howard	George Cukor	
1933	The Kiss Before the Mirror	Lucy's Lover	James Whale	
1934	Journal of a Crime	Florestan	William Keighley	
1934	Good Badminton	Walter		
1936	Big Brown Eyes	Richard Morey	Raoul Walsh	
1936	Fatal Lady	David Roberts	Edward Ludwig	
1937	She's Dangerous	Dr. Scott Logan	Lewis R. Foster	
1937	Girl Overboard	Paul Stacey	Sidney Salkow	
1937	As Good as Married	Fraser James	Edward Buzzell	
1937	Saratoga	Hartley Madison	Jack Conway	
1937	My Dear Miss Aldrich	Ken Morley	George B. Seitz	
1937	A Girl with Ideas	Mickey McGuire	S. Sylvan Simon	
1938	Man-Proof	Alan Wythe	Richard Thorpe	
1938	The Girl of the Golden West	Jack Rance	Robert Z. Leonard	
1938	The Shopworn Angel	Sam Bailey	H.C. Potter	
1938	Too Hot to Handle	William O. "Bill" Dennis	Jack Conway	
1938	Listen, Darling	Richard Thurlow	Edwin L. Marin	
1939	Society Lawyer	Christopher Durant	Edwin L. Marin	
1939	6,000 Enemies	Steve Donegan	George B. Seitz	
1939	Stronger Than Desire	Tyler Flagg	Leslie Fenton	
1939	Nick Carter, Master Detective	Nick Carter / Robert Chalmers	Jacques Tourneur	
1940	I Take This Woman	Phil Mayberry		Scenes deleted
1940	The House Across the Bay	Tim	Alfred Hitchcock (Uncredited)	
1940	It's a Date	John Arlen	William A. Seiter	
1940	Dark Command	William 'Will' Cantrell	Raoul Walsh	
1940	Phantom Raiders	Nick Carter	Jacques Tourneur	
1940	Sky Murder	Nick Carter	George B. Seitz	
1940	Flight Command	Squadron Cmdr. Billy Gary	Frank Borzage	
1941	Man Hunt	Captain Alan Thorndike	Fritz Lang	
1941	Blossoms in the Dust	Sam Gladney	Mervyn LeRoy	
1941	How Green Was My Valley	Mr. Gruffydd	John Ford	
1941	Design for Scandal	Jeff Sherman	Norman Taurog	
1942	Mrs. Miniver	Clem Miniver	William Wyler	
1942	White Cargo	Harry Witzel	Richard Thorpe	
1943	The Youngest Profession	Himself	Edward Buzzell	
1943	Madame Curie	Pierre Curie	Mervyn LeRoy	
1944	Mrs. Parkington	Major Augustus 'Gus' Parkington	Tay Garnett	
1945	Week-End at the Waldorf	Chip Collyer	Robert Z. Leonard	
1946	Holiday in Mexico	Jeffrey Evans	George Sidney	
1946	The Secret Heart	Chris Matthews	Robert Z. Leonard	
1947	Cass Timberlane	Himself – Party Guest	George Sidney	Uncredited
1947	If Winter Comes	Mark Sabre	Victor Saville	
1948	Julia Misbehaves	William Sylvester Packett	Jack Conway	
1948	Command Decision	Major General Roland Goodlaw Kane	Sam Wood	
1949	The Red Danube	Col. Michael S. "Hooky" Nicobar	George Sidney	
1949	That Forsyte Woman	Young Jolyon Forsyte	Compton Bennett	
1950	The Miniver Story	Clem Miniver	H.C. Potter	
1951	Soldiers Three	Col. Brunswick	Tay Garnett	
1951	Calling Bulldog Drummond	Maj. Hugh "Bulldog" Drummond	Victor Saville	
1951	Quo Vadis	Narrator	Mervyn LeRoy	Voice, uncredited
1951	The Unknown Man	Dwight Bradley Masen	Richard Thorpe	
1952	The Sellout	Haven D. Allridge	Gerald Mayer	
1952	Million Dollar Mermaid	Frederick Kellerman	Mervyn LeRoy	
1952	The Bad and the Beautiful	Harry Pebbel	Vincente Minnelli	
1953	Scandal at Scourie	Patrick J. McChesney	Jean Negulesco	
1953	Dream Wife	Walter McBride	Sidney Sheldon	
1954	Executive Suite	Frederick Y. Alderson	Robert Wise	
1954	Men of the Fighting Lady	Comdr. Kent Dowling	Andrew Marton	
1954	The Last Time I Saw Paris	James Ellswirth	Richard Brooks	
1954	Deep in My Heart	J.J. Shubert	Stanley Donen	
1955	Hit the Deck	Rear Adm. Daniel Xavier Smith	Roy Rowland	
1955	The Glass Slipper	Narrator	Charles Walters	Voice, uncredited
1956	Forbidden Planet	Dr. Morbius	Fred M. Wilcox	
1956	These Wilder Years	James Rayburn	Roy Rowland	
1956	The Rack	Col. Edward W. Hall, Sr.	Arnold Laven	
1958	Swiss Family Robinson	Father		
1959	Meet Me in St. Louis	Mr. Alonzo Smith		TV Movie
1961	Voyage to the Bottom of the Sea	Adm. Harriman Nelson	Irwin Allen	
1962	Advise and Consent	Senate Majority Leader	Otto Preminger	
1962	Big Red	James Haggin	Norman Tokar	
1963	The Two Colonels	Colonello Timothy Henderson	Steno	
1963	The Shortest Day	Ernest Hemingway	Sergio Corbucci	Uncredited
1963	Anniversary	Narrator		
1964	Mr. Kingston			
1965	Cinderella	King	Ralph Nelson	
1967	How I Spent My Summer Vacation	Lewis Gannet		
1967	Warning Shot	Orville Ames	Buzz Kulik	
1968	The Vatican Affair	Professor Herbert Cummings	Emilio Miraglia	
1968	Funny Girl	Florenz Ziegfeld	William Wyler	
1969	Rascal	Sterling North	Norman Tokar	Voice
1970	House on Greenapple Road	Mayor Jack Parker	Robert Day	
1970	The Mask of Sheba	Dr. Max van Condon	David Lowell Rich	
1972	The Screaming Woman	Dr. Amos Larkin	Jack Smight	
1972	Skyjacked	Sen. Arne Lindner	John Guillermin	
1973	The Neptune Factor	Dr. Samuel Andrews	Daniel Petrie	
1973	Harry in Your Pocket	Casey	Bruce Geller	
1974	Live Again, Die Again	Thomas Carmichael	Richard A. Colla	
1974	The Girl on the Late, Late Show	John Pahlman	Gary Nelson	
1975	You Lie So Deep, My Love	Uncle Joe Padway	David Lowell Rich	
1975	Murder on Flight 502	Charlie Parkins	George McCowan	
1976	The Lindbergh Kidnapping Case	Judge Trenchard	Buzz Kulik	
1976	Won Ton Ton, the Dog Who Saved Hollywood	Grayson's Butler	Michael Winner	
1976	Two-Minute Warning	The Pickpocket	Larry Peerce	
1978	Sextette	The Chairman	Ken Hughes	

== Radio appearances ==
Year	Program	Episode/source
1946	Lux Radio Theatre	Mrs. Parkington
1946	Lux Radio Theatre	Together Again
1952	Screen Guild Theatre	"Heaven Can Wait"
1953	Lux Radio Theatre	The People Against O'Hara
