= Marriage (1927 film) =

1927 film by Roy William Neill

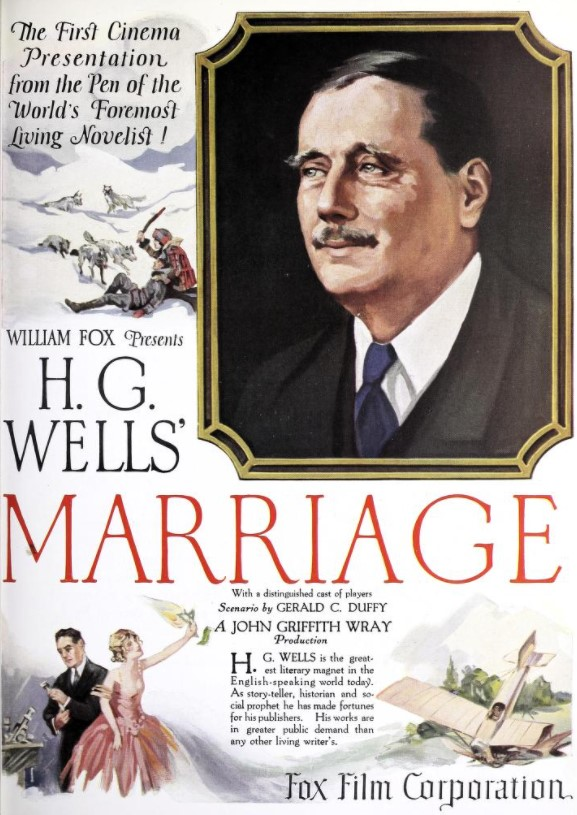
- 1925 advertisement announcing film
- Directed by: Roy William Neill
- Screenplay by: Gertrude Orr; Elizabeth Pickett Chevalier
- Based on: Marriage by H. G. Wells
- Starring: Virginia Valli; Allan Durant; Gladys McConnell; Lawford Davidson; Donald Stuart; Frank Dunn
- Cinematography: Rudolph J. Bergquist
- Edited by: Elizabeth Pickett Chevalier
- Production company: Fox Film Corporation
- Distributed by: Fox Film Corporation
- Release date: February 13, 1927
- Running time: 56 minutes
- Country: United States
- Language: Silent (English intertitles)

Marriage is a lost 1927 American silent drama film directed by Roy William Neill and written by Gertrude Orr and Elizabeth Pickett Chevalier. It is based on the 1912 novel Marriage by H. G. Wells. The film stars Virginia Valli, Allan Durant, Gladys McConnell, Lawford Davidson, Donald Stuart, and Frank Dunn. The film was released on February 13, 1927, by Fox Film Corporation.

== Cast ==
- Virginia Valli as Marjorie Pope
- Allan Durant as Prof. Trafford
- Gladys McConnell as Daphne Pope
- Lawford Davidson as Sir Roderick Dover
- Donald Stuart as MacDurgan
- Frank Dunn as Magnet
- Edwards Davis as Pope
- James A. Marcus as Solomson
- Billie Bennett as Mrs. Pope
