= Justice Woodson =

Justice Woodson may refer to:

- Archelaus Marius Woodson (1854–1925), associate justice of the Supreme Court of Missouri
- David M. Woodson (1806–1877), associate justice of the Illinois Supreme Court, for one month
