= Wolf Fangs =

1927 film

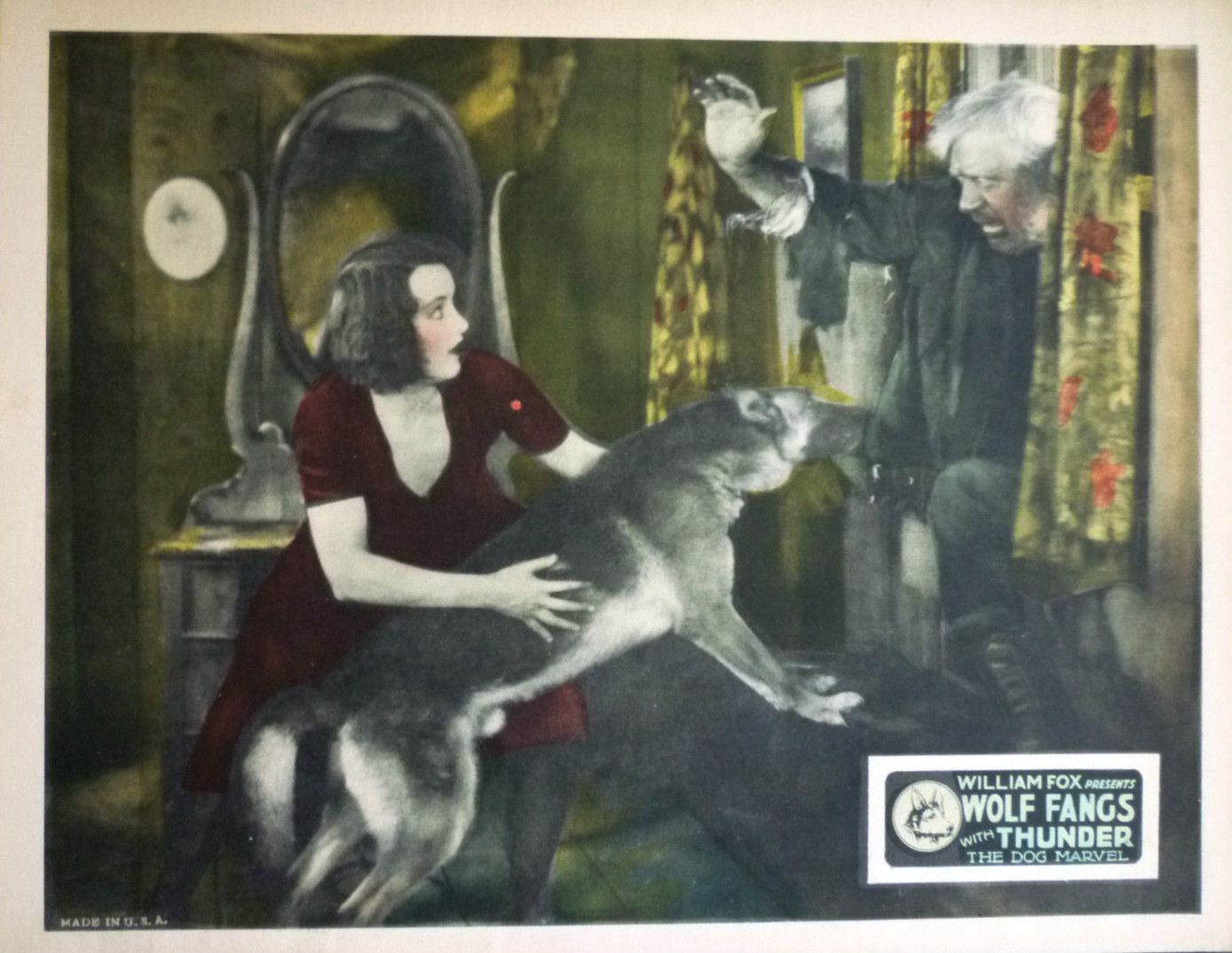
- Lobby card showing the character Ellen trying to restrain her dog Thunder
- Directed by: Lewis Seiler
- Screenplay by: Seton I. Miller; Elizabeth Pickett Chevalier
- Story by: Seton I. Miller; Elizabeth Pickett Chevalier
- Starring: Thunder the Dog; Caryl Lincoln; Charles Morton
- Cinematography: L. William O'Connell
- Production company: Fox Film Corporation
- Distributed by: Fox Film Corporation
- Release date: November 27, 1927
- Running time: 60 minutes; six reels (5,331 feet)
- Country: United States
- Language: English

Wolf Fangs is a 1927 American action film directed by Lewis Seiler and written by Seton I. Miller and Elizabeth Pickett Chevalier. The film stars Thunder the Dog supported by Caryl Lincoln, Charles Morton, Frank Rice and James Gordon. Released in November 1927, the feature was produced and distributed by Fox Film Corporation.

== Cast ==
- Thunder the Dog as Thunder
- Caryl Lincoln as Ellen
- Charles Morton as Neal Barrett
- Frank Rice as Pete
- James Gordon as Bill Garside
