= Marriage License? =

1926 film by Frank Borzage

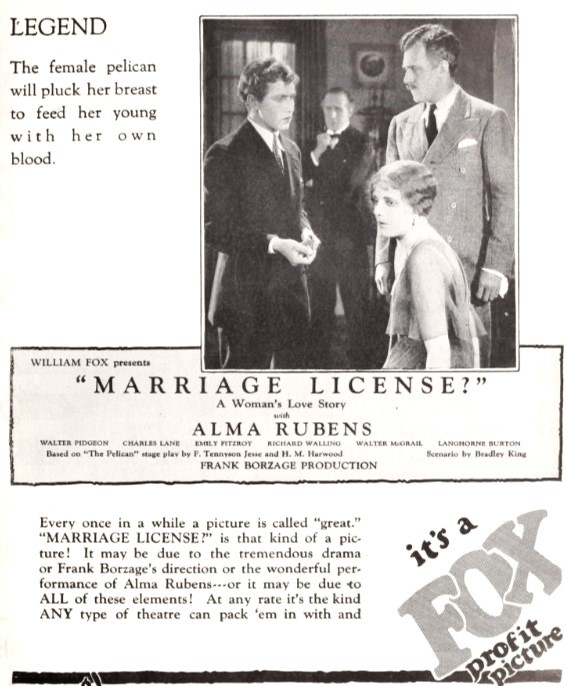
- Advertisement
- Directed by: Frank Borzage
- Screenplay by: Bradley King; Elizabeth Pickett Chevalier
- Based on: The Pelican by: F. Tennyson Jesse; H. M. Harwood
- Starring: Alma Rubens; Walter McGrail; Richard Walling; Walter Pidgeon
- Cinematography: Ernest Palmer
- Production company: Fox Film Corporation
- Distributed by: Fox Film Corporation
- Release date: September 5, 1926
- Running time: 80 minutes
- Country: United States
- Language: Silent (English intertitles)

Marriage License? is a 1926 American silent drama film directed by Frank Borzage and written by Bradley King and Elizabeth Pickett Chevalier. It is based on the 1925 play The Pelican by F. Tennyson Jesse and H. M. Harwood. The film stars Alma Rubens, Walter McGrail, Richard Walling, Walter Pidgeon, Charles Lane, and Emily Fitzroy. The film was released on September 5, 1926, by Fox Film Corporation.

== Cast ==
- Alma Rubens as Wanda Heriot
- Walter McGrail as Marcus Heriot
- Richard Walling as Robin
- Walter Pidgeon as Paul
- Charles Lane as Sir John
- Emily Fitzroy as Lady Heriot
- Langhorn Burton as Cheriton
- Edgar Norton as Beadon
- George Cowl as Amercrombie
- Lon Poff as Footman

== Preservation ==
A print of Marriage License? is listed as being held by a foreign film archive.
