= Fleetwing (film) =

1928 film

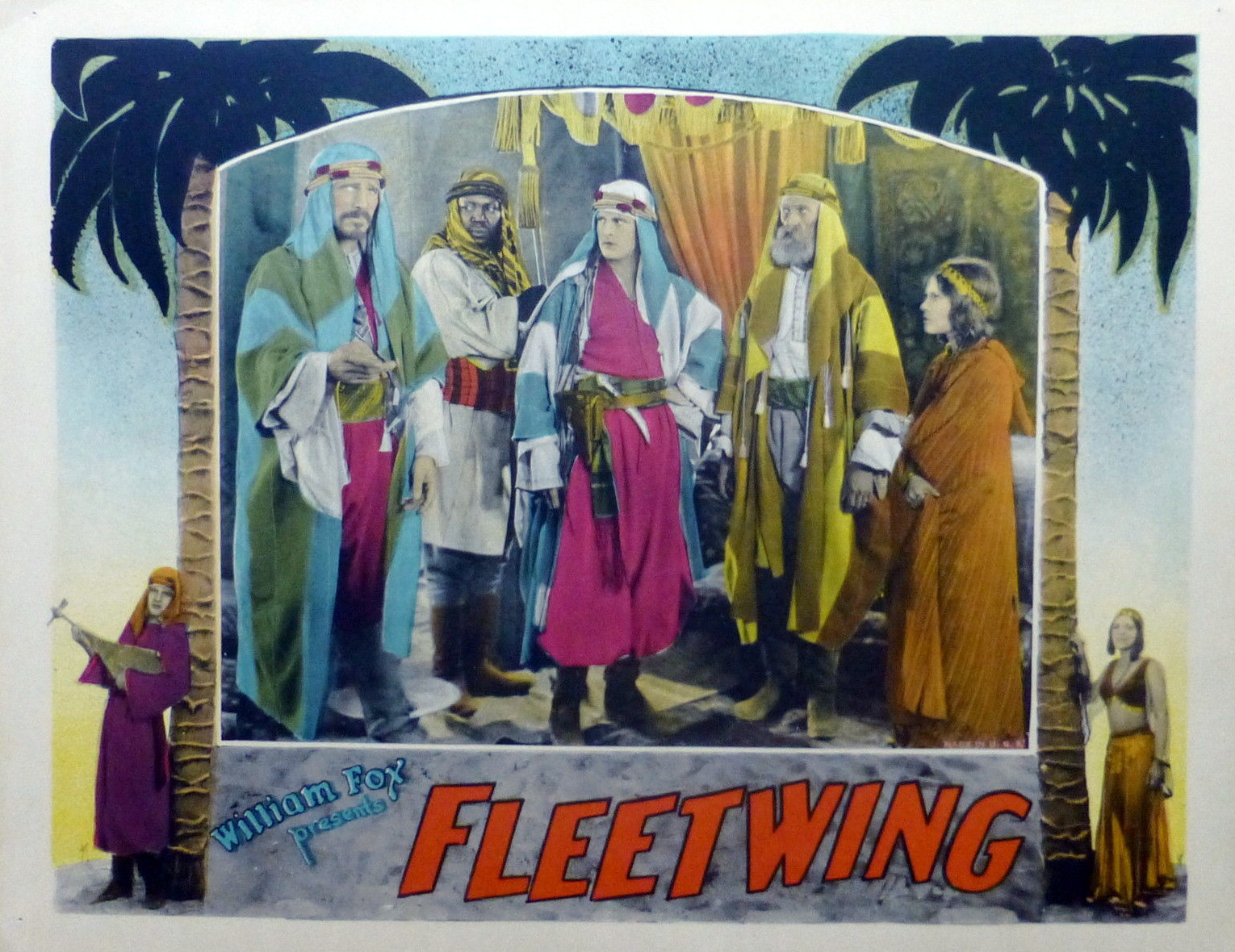
- Lobby card
- Directed by: Lambert Hillyer
- Written by: Elizabeth Pickett Chevalier; Alex Troffey
- Produced by: William Fox
- Starring: Barry Norton; Dorothy Janis; Ben Bard; Bob Kortman
- Cinematography: Frank B. Good
- Edited by: Elizabeth Pickett Chevalier
- Production company: Fox Film Corporation
- Distributed by: Fox Film Corporation
- Release date: June 24, 1928
- Running time: 50 minutes
- Country: United States
- Language: Silent (English intertitles)

Fleetwing is a 1928 American silent drama film directed by Lambert Hillyer and written by Elizabeth Pickett Chevalier and Alex Troffey. The film stars Barry Norton, Dorothy Janis, Ben Bard, and Bob Kortman. The film was released on June 24, 1928 by Fox Film Corporation.

== Cast ==
- Barry Norton as Jaafor
- Dorothy Janis as Thurya
- Ben Bard as Metaab
- Bob Kortman as Auda
- Erville Alderson as Trad Ben Sabam
- James H. Anderson as Mansoni
- Blanche Friderici as Furja

== Production ==
Fleetwing was partially filmed on location near Yuma, Arizona.

== Preservation ==
The film is now considered lost.

== See also ==
- List of lost films
- 1937 Fox vault fire
