= Cinderella of the Hills =

1921 film by Howard M. Mitchell

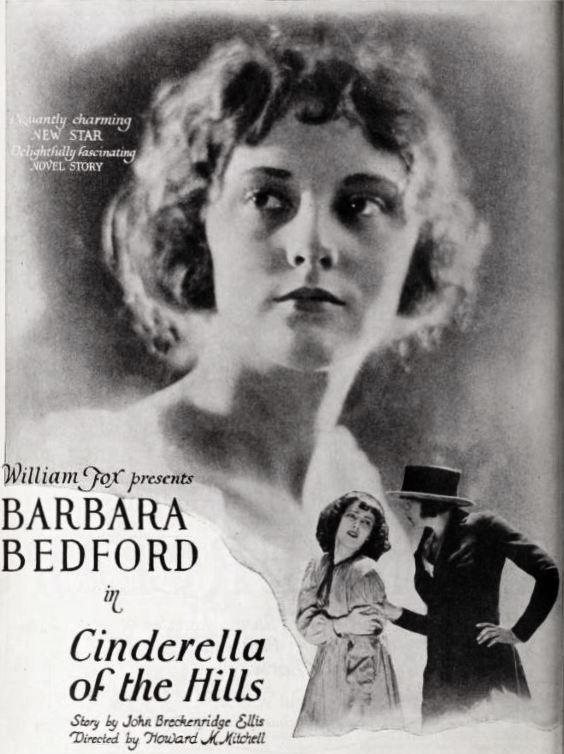
- Directed by: Howard M. Mitchell
- Written by: Dorothy Yost (scenario)
- Based on: the novel Little Fiddler of the Ozarks by J. Breckenridge Ellis
- Produced by: William Fox
- Starring: Barbara Bedford
- Cinematography: George Webber
- Distributed by: Fox Film Corporation
- Release date: October 23, 1921
- Running time: 5 reels
- Country: USA
- Language: Silent..English titles

Cinderella of the Hills is a lost 1921 silent drama film directed by Howard M. Mitchell and starring Barbara Bedford and Barbara La Marr. It was produced and distributed by Fox Film Corporation.

== Cast ==
- Barbara Bedford - Norris Gradley
- Carl Miller - Claude Wolcott
- Cecil Van Auker - Rodney Bates
- Clarence Wilson - Peter Poff
- Tom McGuire - Giles
- Barbara La Marr - Kate Gradley (as Barbara La Marr Deely)
