= Kentucky Pride =

1925 film directed by John Ford

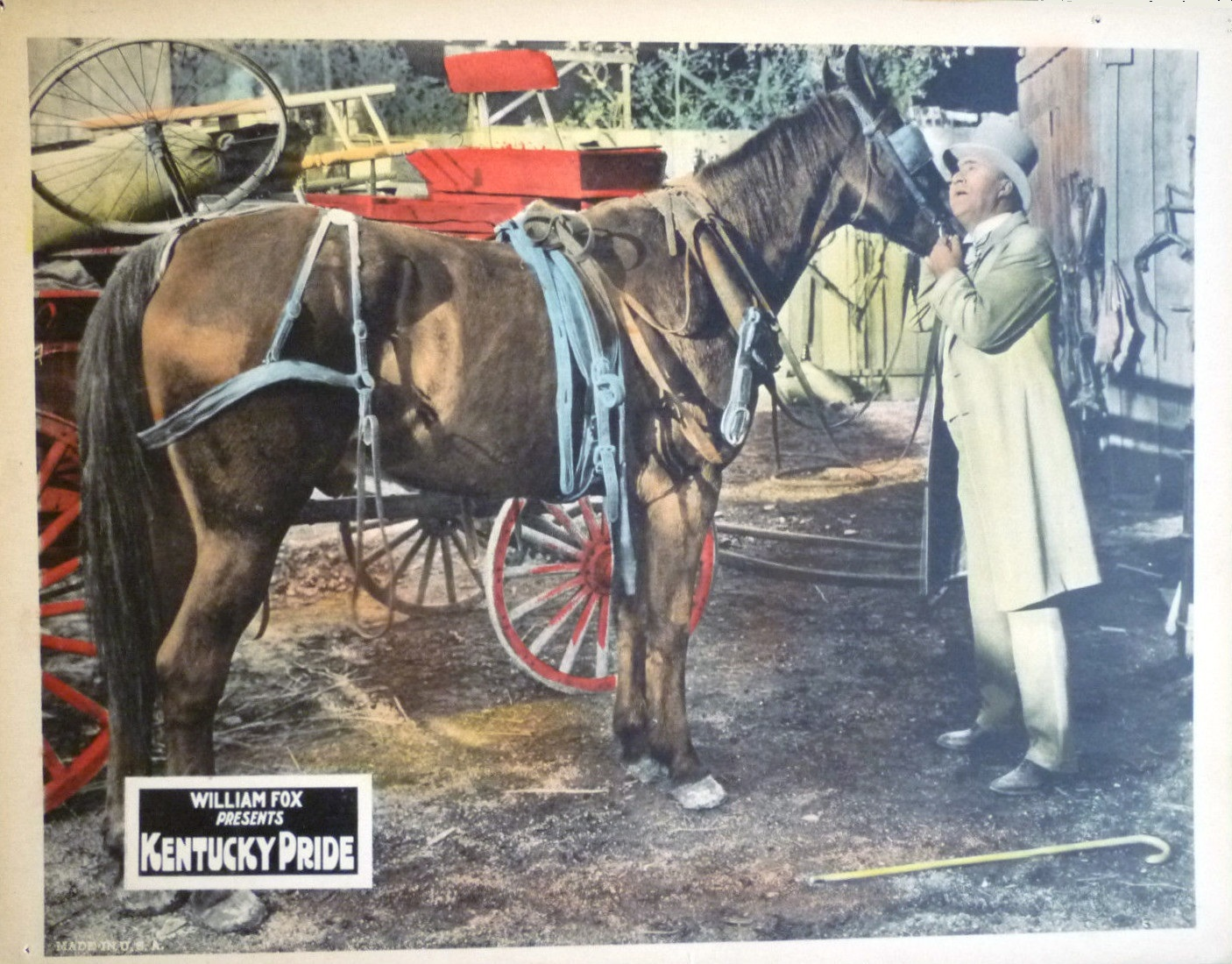
- Lobby card
- Directed by: John Ford
- Written by: Dorothy Yost; Elizabeth Pickett (titles)
- Produced by: William Fox
- Starring: Henry B. Walthall; Gertrude Astor; Peaches Jackson
- Cinematography: George Schneiderman
- Distributed by: Fox Film Corporation
- Release date: September 6, 1925
- Running time: 70 minutes
- Country: United States
- Language: Silent (English intertitles)

Kentucky Pride (1925) by John Ford

Kentucky Pride is a 1925 American silent drama film from Fox Film about the life of a horse breeder and racer, directed by the famed film director John Ford and starring Henry B. Walthall (who had previously played the Little Colonel in D. W. Griffith's controversial 1915 film The Birth of a Nation). It is among Ford's lesser-known works, but has been praised for sweetness and charm and its beautiful depiction of the life of horses and the relationship between the protagonist and his daughter. Several well-known thoroughbred racehorses appear in the film, including the legendary Man o' War. A print of Kentucky Pride is in the Museum of Modern Art film archive.

== Plot ==
The plot concerns Beaumont, a horse breeder with a penchant for gambling, who is down on his luck. After losing at poker and being forced to give up several of his horses to cover his losses, Beaumont bets it all and loses again when his horse, Virginia's Future, suddenly falls and breaks a leg while leading the pack in a critical race. Beaumont's selfish wife tells the horse's trainer, Mike Donovan, to kill the injured horse, and abandons Beaumont for Greve Carter, a well-to-do neighbor. Beaumont also loses his relationship with Virginia, his daughter from his previous marriage. Beaumont and Donovan manage to save Virginia's Future, and she births a colt (or a filly) named Confederacy, but his financial troubles force him to sell off both the colt and the mare. Confederacy is mistreated by his new owner, a foreign junk dealer, and Virginia's Future is forced into hard labor as a pack horse. But when Confederacy is later entered to run in the Futurity, ridden by Mike Donovan's son Danny, Beaumont gathers everything he can and bets it all again. This time he wins. He is reunited with his daughter and buys back the colt, giving it a good life in the pasture.

== Cast ==
- Gertrude Astor as Mrs. Beaumont, the selfish second wife of Mr. Beaumont
- Peaches Jackson as Beaumont's daughter Virginia
- J. Farrell MacDonald as Mike Donovan, horse trainer
- Winston Miller as Mike Donovan's son Danny
- Belle Stoddard as Mrs. Donovan
- Malcolm Waite as the neighbor Greve Carter
- Henry B. Walthall as Mr. Beaumont, the protagonist horse breeder
- George H. Reed
- Sayre Dearing as Racetrack Spectator (uncredited)

Several notable horses appeared in the film, including

- Man o' War, widely considered one of the greatest racehorses of all time, winner of the Preakness Stakes and Belmont Stakes and many other prominent races (not entered in the Kentucky Derby)
- Fair Play, sire of Man o' War and several other renowned thoroughbreds, progeny including Display, Mad Play, Ladkin, Mad Hatter, Chance Play, Chance Shot, and Fairmount
- Negofol, French-bred winner of the 1909 Prix de Guiche, sire of several famed horses including Coventry, Hourless, and Vito
- The Finn, winner of the 1915 Belmont Stakes and sire of Zev and Flying Ebony
- Morvich, winner of the 1922 Kentucky Derby (the first California-bred racehorse to win the Derby)

== Reception ==
The New York Times failed to review the film at the time of its release. In later critical commentary, Joseph McBride said the film has "unexpected sweetness and charm", and Shigehiko Hasumi praised it for its beautiful depiction of the life of horses and the relationship between the protagonist and his daughter. Scott Eyman said "Kentucky Pride remains a shameless – shamelessly effective – film".

== See also ==
- List of films about horses
- List of films about horse racing
