= Call of the Yukon =

1938 film by B. Reeves Eason

- Directed by: John T. Coyle (co-director); B. Reeves Eason (co-director)
- Written by: James Oliver Curwood (novel Swift Lightning); Gertrude Orr (screenplay); William Bartlett (screenplay)
- Produced by: Armand Schaefer for Republic Pictures
- Starring: Richard Arlen; Beverly Roberts; Lyle Talbot
- Cinematography: Ernest Miller
- Edited by: Howard O'Neill
- Music by: Alberto Colombo
- Production company: Republic Pictures
- Distributed by: Republic Pictures
- Release date: April 18, 1938
- Running time: 70 minutes
- Country: United States
- Language: English

Call of the Yukon is a 1938 American action adventure film produced and released by Republic Pictures, directed by John T. Coyle and B. Reeves Eason and starring Richard Arlen, Beverly Roberts and Lyle Talbot. The film features extensive Alaskan location shooting by Norman Dawn who shot several films there. The film is based on the 1926 novel Swift Lightning A Story Of Wildlife Adventure In The Frozen North by Northern genre writer James Oliver Curwood. The film's working titles were Thunder in Alaska and Swift Lightning.

== Plot ==
Adventuring author Jean Williams is living in the wilds of Alaska alongside the Eskimo people gathering material for her novel. She befriends several animals who become her loyal friends such as a pair of bear cubs whose mother has been killed by hunter Gaston Rogers, a talking raven and the bereaved collie Firefly who will not leave the grave of her master, a game warden killed in the line of duty.

The community is imperiled by a pack of wolves and wild dogs, led by a wild dog called Swift Lightning, who are killing all the reindeer. With the supply of fresh meat gone, the Eskimos are migrating to lands with more food. Hunter Gaston agrees to take Jean to Nenana, Alaska, along with his furs by dog sled. Jean, who despises Gaston as being more savage and bloodthirsty than the four-legged predators, is followed by her loyal animals.

The pair face attacks by wolves, an avalanche, and being trapped on a river whose ice floes are melting.

== Cast ==
- Richard Arlen as Gaston Rogers
- Beverly Roberts as Jean Williams
- Lyle Talbot as Hugo Henderson
- Mala as Olee John
- Garry Owen as Conner
- Ivan Miller as O'Malley
- Billy Dooley as Watchman
- Al St. John as Joe
- Emory Parnell as Swenson
- Swift Lightning
- Firefly the Collie
- Buck, The St. Bernard
- Toughie the Bear
- Roughie the Bear
- Winkey the Talking Raven
