= Soul of the Beast =

1923 film

- Directed by: John Griffith Wray
- Written by: Ralph Dixon
- Story by: C. Gardner Sullivan
- Produced by: Thomas H. Ince
- Starring: Madge Bellamy; Cullen Landis; Noah Beery
- Cinematography: Henry Sharp
- Production company: Thomas H. Ince Corporation
- Distributed by: Metro Pictures
- Release date: May 7, 1923
- Running time: 65 minutes
- Country: United States
- Language: Silent (English intertitles)

Soul of the Beast is a 1923 American silent romantic drama film directed by John Griffith Wray and starring Madge Bellamy, Cullen Landis, and Noah Beery.

== Plot ==
Soul of the Beast (1923)

== Cast ==
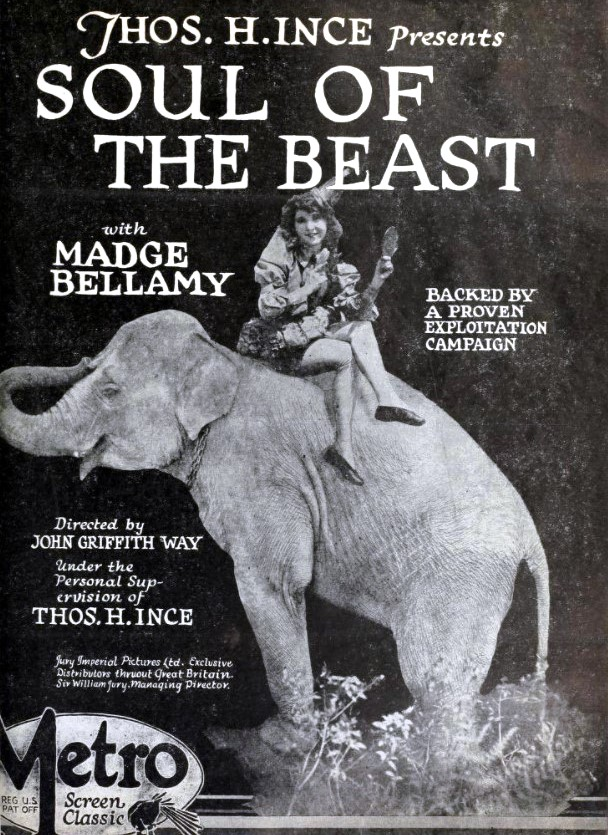
1923 poster

- Madge Bellamy as Ruth Lorrimore
- Cullen Landis as Paul Nadeau
- Noah Beery as Caesar Durand
- Vola Vale as Jacqueline
- Bert Sprotte as Silas Hamm
- Harry L. Rattenberry as Pere Boussut
- Carrie Clark Ward as Mrs. Boussut
- Lincoln Stedman as Henri
- Larry Steers as Policeman
- Vernon Dent as The Boob
- Oscar the Elephant as Oscar

== Bibliography ==
- Munden, Kenneth White. The American Film Institute Catalog of Motion Pictures Produced in the United States, Part 1. University of California Press, 1997.
