= Lahoma (film) =

1920 film

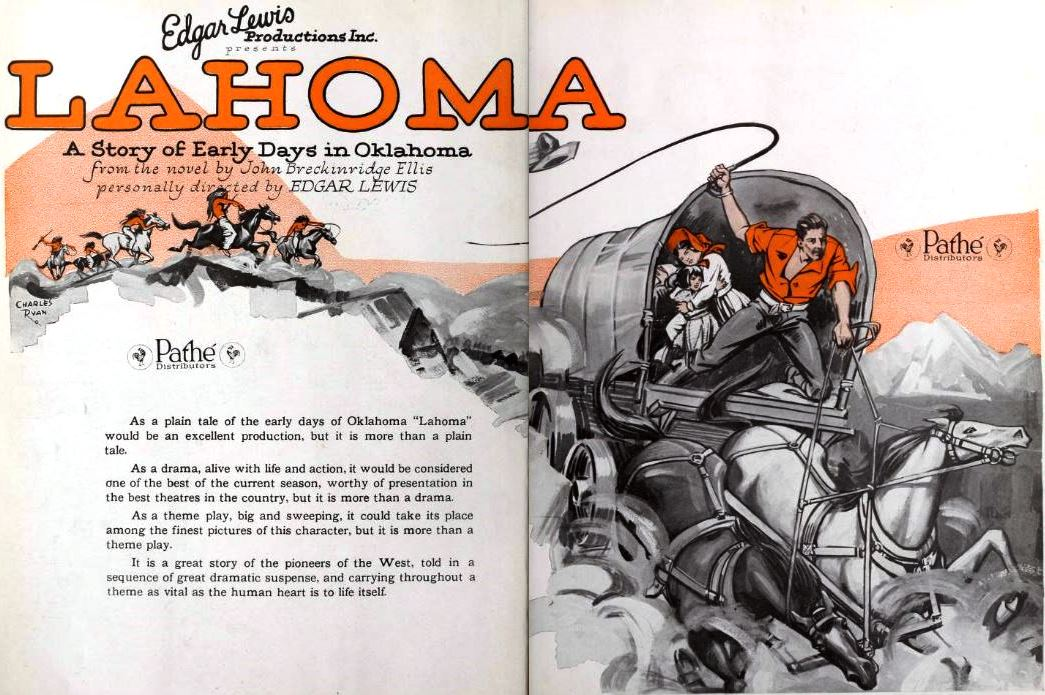
- Directed by: Edgar Lewis
- Based on: Lahoma by J. Breckenridge Ellis
- Produced by: Edgar Lewis
- Starring: Peaches Jackson; Wade Boteler; Jack Perrin
- Cinematography: Edward Earle
- Production company: Edgar Lewis Productions
- Distributed by: Pathé Exchange
- Release date: August 6, 1920
- Running time: 70 minutes
- Country: United States
- Languages: Silent; English intertitles

Lahoma is a 1920 American silent Western film directed by Edgar Lewis and starring Peaches Jackson, Wade Boteler and Jack Perrin. It is based on the 1913 novel Lahoma by J. Breckenridge Ellis.

== Cast ==
- Peaches Jackson as Lahoma, as a child
- Louise Burnham as Lahoma
- Wade Boteler as Henry Gledware
- Lurline Lyons as Mrs. Gledware
- Jack Perrin as Will Compton
- Russell Simpson as 'Brick' Willock
- F.B. Phillips as Bill Atkins
- Will Jeffries as Red Feather
- Yvette Mitchell as Red Fawn
- Bert Lindley as Red Kimball
- Jack Carlyle as Kansas Kimball

== Bibliography ==
- Connelly, Robert B. The Silents: Silent Feature Films, 1910-36, Volume 40, Issue 2. December Press, 1998.
