= Wings of the Storm =

1926 film

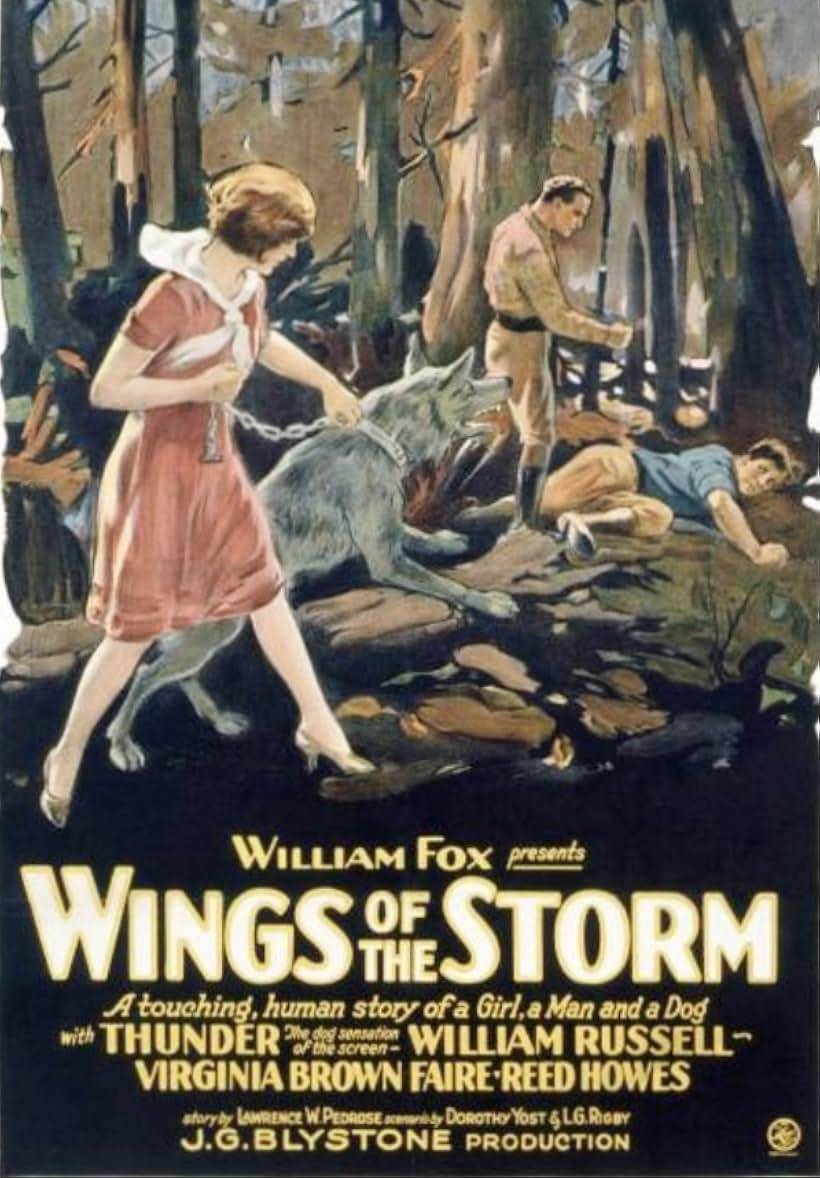
- Theatrical release poster
- Directed by: John G. Blystone
- Screenplay by: Elizabeth Pickett Chevalier; Gordon Rigby; Dorothy Yost
- Based on: On the Wings of the Storm by Lawrence William Pedrose
- Starring: Thunder the Marvel Dog; William Russell; Virginia Brown Faire; Reed Howes
- Cinematography: Robert Kurrle
- Production company: Fox Film Corporation
- Distributed by: Fox Film Corporation
- Release date: November 28, 1926
- Running time: 60 minutes
- Country: United States
- Language: Silent (English intertitles)

Wings of the Storm is a 1926 American "dog-hero" drama film directed by John G. Blystone and written by Elizabeth Pickett Chevalier, Gordon Rigby, and Dorothy Yost. Released in November 1926 by Fox Film Corporation, the film showcases Thunder the Marvel Dog with support from costars William Russell, Virginia Brown Faire, and Reed Howes.

== Cast ==
- Thunder the Marvel Dog as Thunder
- Virginia Brown Faire as Anita Baker
- Reed Howes as Allen Gregory
- William Russell as Bill Martin
- Hank Mann as Red Jones
- White Fawn the Dog as White Fawn
