= Richard Walling =

American actor (1904–1983)

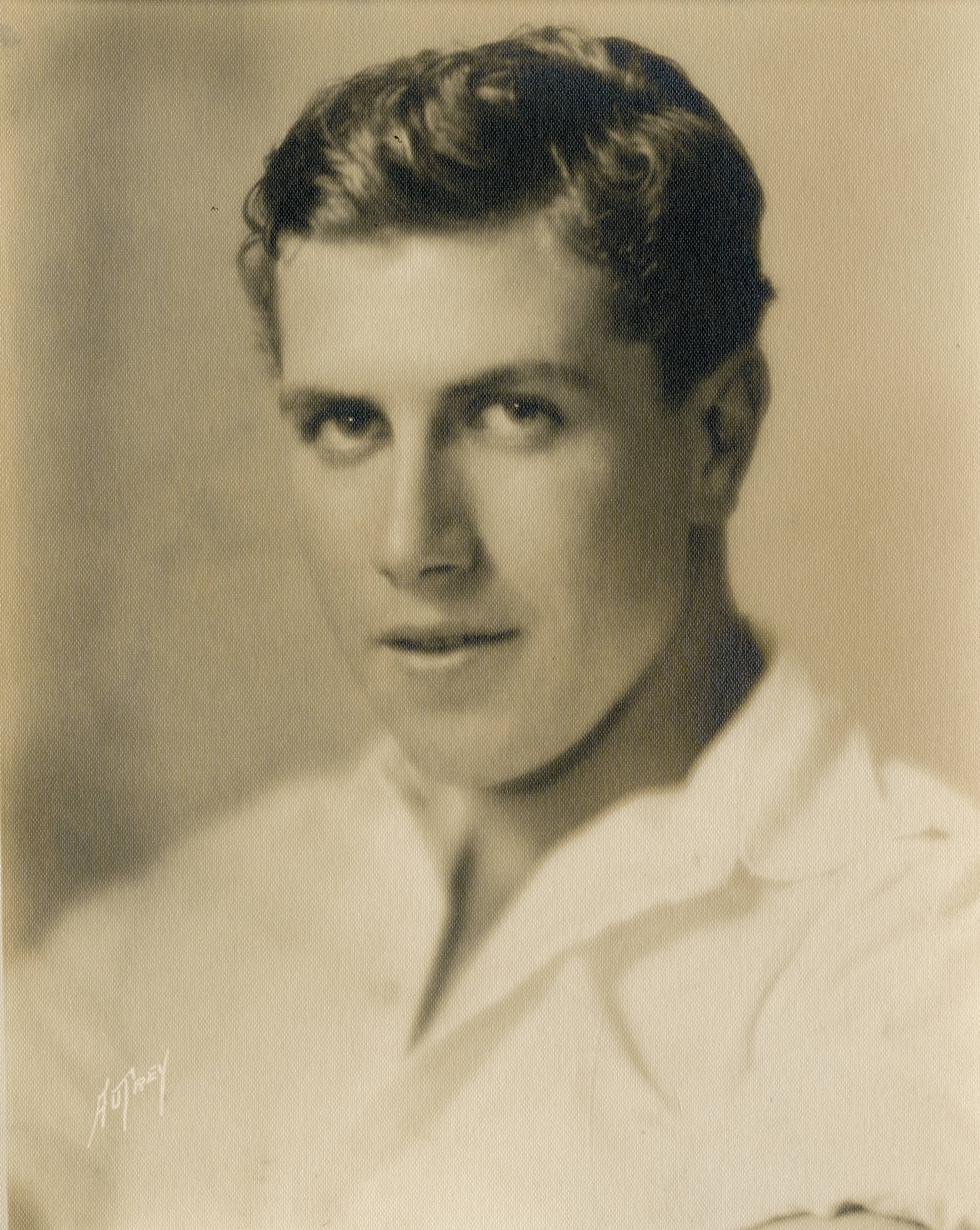
- Walling in 1926
- Born: William Richard Walling, Jr. October 6, 1904
- Died: December 11, 1983 (aged 79)
- Occupations: Actor, inventor, and portrait photographer
- Parent: Will Walling (Father)

William Richard Walling, Jr. (October 6, 1904 – December 11, 1983) was an American actor, inventor, and portrait photographer for film studios.

He was the son of Effie (née Bond) and actor Will Walling. In the early 1970s, Walling invented and patented the Walling Weaving Loom (later known as the Oregon Trail Loom) with his fourth wife Marie (née Nash) Walling, which he sold to Russell E. Groff. He was also a recreational airplane pilot.

== Filmography ==
=== Actor ===
- The City (1926) as Chad Morris
- Marriage License? (1926) as Robin
- The Midnight Kiss (1926) as Thomas H. Atkins Jr.
- Stage Madness (1927) as Jimmy Mason
- Slaves of Beauty (1927) as Robert
- Walking Back (1928) as Smoke Thatcher
- Companionate Marriage (1928) as Donald Moore
- The Head of the Family (1928) as Charley Sullivan
- Silks and Saddles (1929) as Johnny Spencer
- Shanghai Rose (1929) as Gregor West
