= Peaches Jackson =

American actress

Peaches Jackson Guererro
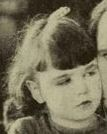
- Born: Charlotte Jackson; October 9, 1913; Buffalo, New York U.S.
- Died: February 23, 2002 (aged 88); Honolulu, Hawaii U.S.
- Occupation: Actress
- Years active: 1917–1933

Peaches Jackson (October 9, 1913 – February 23, 2002) was an American film actress. Her sister, Mary Ann Jackson also became a child actor, and appeared in many of the Little Rascals short films for Hal Roach. Peaches (Charlotte) stopped acting regularly in 1925, and later was a dancer in the film Dancing Lady (1933), and It's Great to Be Alive (1933).

== Filmography ==
Year	Title	Role	Notes
1917	His Sweetheart	Minor Role	
1918	I Love You	Boy	
1918	The Hopper	Roger Livingston Talbot Jr.	
1918	The Greatest Thing in Life	Miss Peaches	
1919	One of the Finest	Mary Jane	
1919	A Rogue's Romance		
1919	Jinx	Orphan	
1920	Rio Grande	Maria Inez, 6 years	
1920	When Dawn Came	Crippled Child	
1920	The Girl in the Web	Bebita	
1920	Lahoma	Lahoma, as a child	
1920	The Prince Chap	Claudia (age 4)	
1920	Midsummer Madness	Peggy Meredith	
1921	Through the Back Door	Conrad	
1921	A Prince There Was	Little girl	
1921	Miss Lulu Bett	Child	Uncredited
1922	The Bachelor Daddy	Nita	
1922	While Justice Waits	A Man's Daughter	
1922	Heroes of the Street		
1923	Circus Days	Jeannette	
1923	Mine to Keep	Joy child	
1923	The Eternal Three	Governor's Child	
1924	Pied Piper Malone	Betty Malone	
1924	Poisoned Paradise: The Forbidden Story of Monte Carlo	Margot LeBlanc - as a Child	
1924	Cytherea	Randon Child	
1925	Kentucky Pride	Virginia Beaumont	
1927	Long Pants	Minor Role	Uncredited
1928	The Godless Girl	Student	Uncredited
1932	She Wanted a Millionaire	Beauty Contest Contestant	Uncredited
1933	It's Great to Be Alive	Dancer, Cuban Girl	Uncredited
1933	Arizona to Broadway	Dancer	Uncredited
1933	Sitting Pretty	Chorus Girl	Uncredited
1933	Dancing Lady	Chorus Girl	Uncredited
1939	Gone with the Wind	Cancan Girl	Uncredited, (final film role)
