= Plattsburg College =

Secondary educational institution

Plattsburg College was a Methodist educational institution in Plattsburg, Missouri in the 19th century. Despite its name, it was primarily focused on educating young men and women of high school age.

== Establishment and Civil War years ==
Established in 1855 as an institution of the Methodist Conference, it was initially named "The Plattsburg High School". The initial building cost $17,000, and "was recognized as one of the finest structures in this part of the state". Constructed on a four-acre tract, the institution was in a red brick building described as "a compact, oblong structure of two stories, with large, old-fashioned windows of many panes", with "a portico and outside entrance at the front of the building".

Reverend Levin Major Lewis was principal of Plattsburg College from 1856 to 1859. During this time, the school "had about 150 pupils each year from Clinton and nearby counties". Lewis was succeeded by Reverend Jesse Bird, who remained for two years, until he was "arrested and imprisoned by Federal authorities during the Civil War for preaching the gospel without taking the oath prescribed in the new constitution of Missouri". After Bird's arrest, his son, Benjamin Bird, ran the school briefly, "the occupancy by the militia interfering with further discharge of his duty as principal".

The building was used as barracks during war, "bullet holes being yet visible in the frames with the doors and windows as a result of it being fired on by soldiers". The house and grounds were "much despoiled of their beauty and fresh appearance while in the possession of soldiery". During the later part of the war "Professor Scott taught the school, and was succeeded by J. N. Thomas, then Capt. E. C. Thomas, Williamson, Brown, Mrs. Lizzie Foster, Linn and Riley, Rev. C. W. Price and others".

The history of the school from then to 1880 is described as follows:

== Post-war years and disestablishment ==
After the war, the school "had a varied history until 1880. Debt gathered and the splendid property fell into the hands of the St. Joseph Building Company, and sold by them in 1879 to Thomas J. Porter, James M. Riley, E. W. Turner, N. T. Essig, John M. McMichael and George R. Riley, of Plattsburg".

In 1880, John W. Ellis purchased Plattsburg College and began teaching classes in the fall of that year, graduating their first class in June, 1881. Ellis was president of the college for seventeen years. Both his wife and his son, J. Breckenridge Ellis, were part of the faculty. During Ellis's tenure, the institution served as "a school for girls and boys, young women and young men", and taught "music and art, and gymnastics, beside the regular course of studies". Ellis's direction of the school was described as "highly successful". During this time, the building was also used for community functions, and "was the scene of many social gatherings", through which it was reported that "[m]any of the most distinguished men of the nation have been entertained within those walls".

In 1897, Ellis "sold the college to the German Baptists, who allowed it to become extinct after much litigation and many legal contests". The building was later "used for a sanitarium for a short time", and a short-lived effort was made to continue conducting a college there under a Dr. Sharpe.

The Plattsburgh Chautauqua Association acquired the building in 1909, and as of 1920, still held the property.

Notable alumni of the institution include Archelaus Marius Woodson, who served on the Supreme Court of Missouri.
