= Dorothy Yost =

American screenwriter

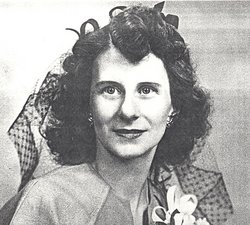
- Born: April 25, 1899; St. Louis, Missouri
- Died: June 10, 1967 (aged 68); Monrovia, California
- Occupation: Screenwriter
- Years active: 1920 - 1954

Dorothy Yost (April 25, 1899 – June 10, 1967), later married as Dorothy Yost Cummings, was a prominent screenwriter whose career lasted from the silent era well into the sound era. Over her lifetime, she worked on more than 90 films, including her own screenplays. She was born in St. Louis, Missouri, and died in Monrovia, California.

== Biography ==
Before screenwriting, Yost appeared in plays produced by the Scovell Juvenile Stock Company. Yost finished her fourth year of high school before heading to California to begin work for the film industry. In 1917, she was hired as a secretary assisting the scenario editor at Triangle Film Corporation. Just six months after she was hired, she was promoted to the head of reading department, where she reviewed and edited scripts.

Yost wrote her first continuity script at the age of 21 in 1920. It was an adaptation of For the Soul of Rafael, based on 1906 novel by Marah Ellis Ryan. Soon enough, in 1927, The Los Angeles Times praised Dorothy Yost as being Hollywood’s youngest and most successful scenarist.

By 1927, Yost joined the writing staff of the Film Booking Offices of America Pictures, the same year she married her husband, Dwight Cummings. Cummings was also part of the writing staff and worked with Yost on Fangs of the Wild in 1928.

== Her goal ==
In her writing, Yost included a focus on Hollywood’s representation of ethnic and racial minorities as well as regional settings. Her films taught lessons for life and often highlighted moral principles. Yost held onto a conservative point of view on gender relations, in part because of the societal times but also because of her strict upbringing and involvement with the Unity Church. Aside from her screenplays, Dorothy published her novel, Prodigal Lover.

== Partial filmography ==
- Flames of the Flesh (1920)
- For the Soul of Rafael (1920)
- Smoldering Embers (1920)
- Lovetime (1921)
- Ever Since Eve (1921)
- Queenie (1921)
- Cinderella of the Hills (1921)
- Jackie (1921)
- One Man in a Million (1921)
- Little Miss Smiles (1922)
- The New Teacher (1922)
- Youth Must Have Love (1922)
- The Footlight Ranger (1923)
- Cause for Divorce (1923)
- When Odds Are Even (1923)
- Kentucky Days (1923)
- Traffic in Hearts (1924)
- Broadway or Bust (1924)
- Romance Ranch (1924)
- My Husband's Wives (1924)
- The Star Dust Trail (1924)
- The Hunted Woman (1925)
- Marriage in Transit (1925)
- She Wolves (1925)
- Kentucky Pride (1925)
- The Millionaire Policeman (1926)
- Wings of the Storm (1926)
- Hills of Kentucky (1927)
- Enemies of Society (1927)
- The Harvester (1927)
- Little Mickey Grogan (1927)
- Judgment of the Hills (1927)
- Fangs of the Wild (1928)
- Wallflowers (1928)
- The Little Yellow House (1928)
- The Sea Bat (1930)
- What Men Want (1930)
- Hello, Everybody! (1933)
- The Gay Divorcee (1934)
- Laddie (1935)
- A Dog of Flanders (1935)
- Alice Adams (1935)
- Freckles (1935)
- Murder on a Bridle Path (1936)
- M'Liss (1936)
- Swing Time (1936)
- Racing Lady (1937)
- Too Many Wives (1937)
- There Goes the Groom (1937)
- The Story of Vernon and Irene Castle (1939)
- Blackmail (1939) (story)
- Bad Little Angel (1939)
- Forty Little Mothers (1940)
- Blossoms in the Dust (1941) (uncredited)
- Thunderhead, Son of Flicka (1945)
- Smoky (1946)
- The Strawberry Roan (1948)
- Loaded Pistols (1948)
- The Cowboy and the Indians (1949)
- The Big Cat (1949)
- Saginaw Trail (1953)
- Smoky (1966) (used 1946 screenplay)
