= The Love Hunger =

1919 silent film

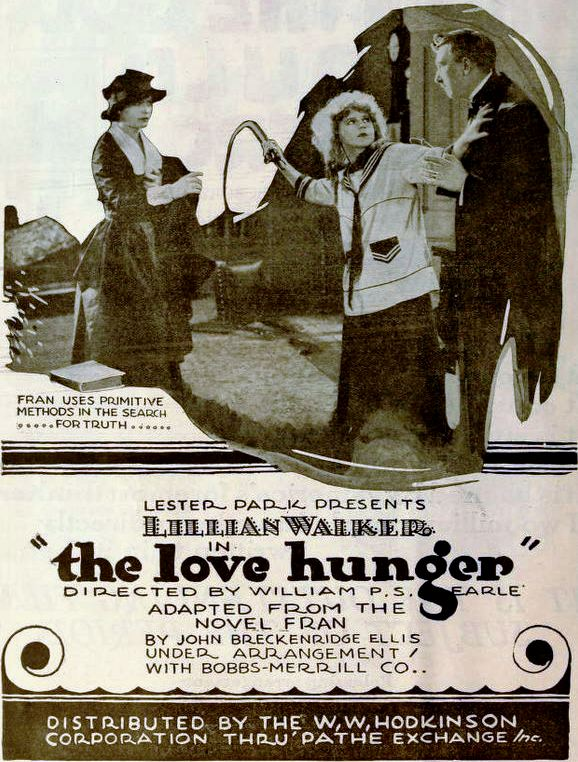
- Directed by: William P.S. Earle
- Written by: J. Breckenridge Ellis (novel); William P.S. Earle; Arthur Edwin
- Starring: Lillian Walker; Lee Shumway; Herbert Prior
- Production company: Lillian Walker Pictures Corporation
- Distributed by: Hodkinson Pictures
- Release date: February 24, 1919
- Running time: 50 minutes
- Country: United States
- Languages: Silent; English intertitles

The Love Hunger is a 1919 American silent comedy film directed by William P.S. Earle and starring Lillian Walker, Lee Shumway and Herbert Prior.

== Cast ==
- Lillian Walker as Fran
- Lee Shumway as Abbott Ashton
- Herbert Prior as Hamilton Gregory
- Allene Hale as Grace Noir
- Lydia Knott as Mrs. Gregory
- Andrew Arbuckle as Bob Clinton
- Billy Bletcher as Jakey
- Cora Drew as Mrs. Jefferson

== Preservation ==
With no holdings located in archives, The Love Hunger is considered a lost film.

== Bibliography ==
- Goble, Alan. The Complete Index to Literary Sources in Film. Walter de Gruyter, 1999.
