= The Head of the Family (1928 film) =

1928 film

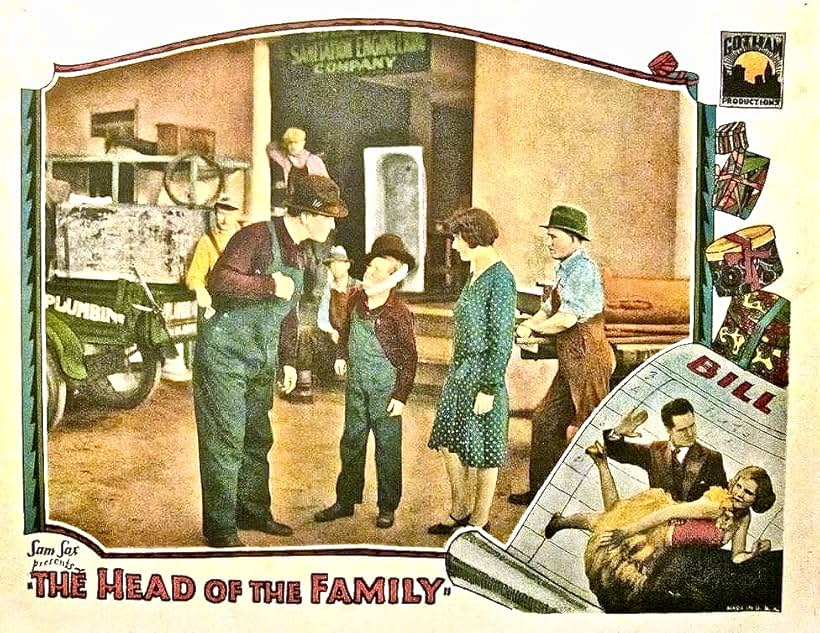
- Directed by: Joseph Boyle
- Written by: George Randolph Chester; Peter Milne; Casey Robinson
- Produced by: Samuel Sax; Harold Shumate
- Starring: William Russell; Mickey Bennett; Virginia Lee Corbin
- Cinematography: Charles Van Enger
- Edited by: W. Donn Hayes
- Production company: Gotham Productions
- Distributed by: Lumas Film Corporation
- Release date: January 18, 1928
- Country: United States
- Language: Silent (English intertitles)

The Head of the Family is a 1928 American silent comedy film directed by Joseph Boyle and starring William Russell, Mickey Bennett, and Virginia Lee Corbin.

== Cast ==
- William Russell as The Plumber
- Mickey Bennett as His Assistant
- Virginia Lee Corbin as Alice Sullivan
- Richard Walling as Charley Sullivan
- Alma Bennett as Mabel Manning
- William Welsh as Daniel Sullivan
- Aggie Herring as Maggie Sullivan

== Bibliography ==
- Munden, Kenneth White. The American Film Institute Catalog of Motion Pictures Produced in the United States, Part 1. University of California Press, 1997.
