= The Shamrock Handicap =

1926 film directed by John Ford

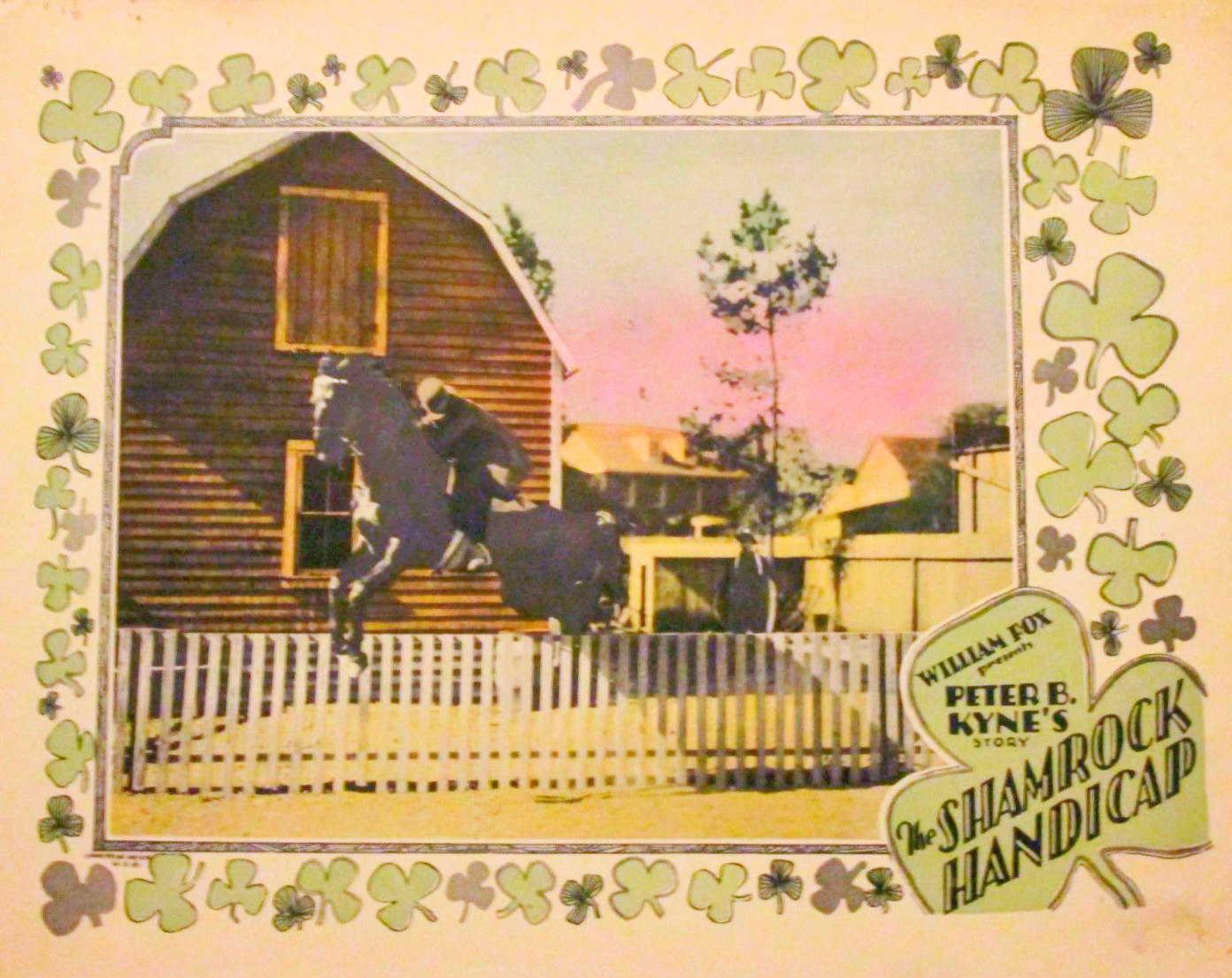
- Lobby card
- Directed by: John Ford
- Written by: Peter B. Kyne; John Stone; Elizabeth Pickett (titles)
- Produced by: John Ford
- Starring: Janet Gaynor; Leslie Fenton
- Cinematography: George Schneiderman
- Distributed by: Fox Film Corporation
- Release date: 2 May 1926
- Running time: 66 minutes (22.9 frame/s)
- Country: United States
- Language: Silent (English intertitles)

The Shamrock Handicap is a 1926 American romance film directed by John Ford.

== Plot ==
The Shamrock Handicap (1926)

As described in a film magazine review, young Neil Ross bids good bye to Sheila and sails to America with Finch, who promises to make him a famous jockey. Neil is injured in his first race and is partially paralyzed. Sheila and her father, now bankrupt, come to America and learn of Neil's sad plight. Rosaleen, an Irish filly and the last of Sheila's father's prize string, is entered in the big handicap and Neil is heartbroken because he cannot ride her. At the last minute before the race, the scheduled jockey is injured. Neil jumps into the saddle, rides Rosaleen to victory, curing his paralysis at the same time. With the winnings, they all sail back to Ireland.

== Cast ==
- Janet Gaynor as Lady Sheila O'Hara
- Leslie Fenton as Neil Ross
- Willard Louis as Orville Finch
- J. Farrell MacDonald as Cornelius Emmet Sarsfield "Con" O'Shea
- Claire McDowell as Molly O'Shea
- Louis Payne as Sir Miles O'Hara
- George Harris as Jockey Bennie Ginsburg (credited as Georgie Harris)
- Andy Clark as "Chesty" Morgan
- Ely Reynolds as Virus Cakes
- Thomas Delmar as Michaels (uncredited)
- Bill Elliott as Well-Wishing Villager (uncredited)
- Brandon Hurst as The Procurer of Taxes (uncredited)
- Eric Mayne as Doctor (uncredited)

== Preservation ==
Prints of the film exists in the Museum of Modern Art film archive and Cinematheque Royale de Belgique.

== See also ==
- List of films about horses
- List of films about horse racing
