= Walking Back =

1928 film

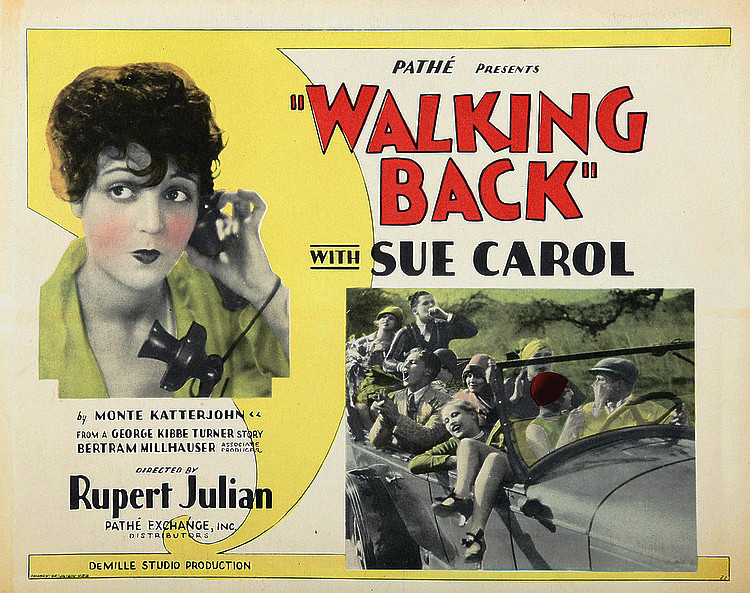
- Lobby card
- Directed by: Rupert Julian; Cecil B. DeMille (uncredited)
- Written by: Monte M. Katterjohn
- Based on: "A Ride in the Country" by George Kibbe Turner
- Starring: Sue Carol
- Cinematography: John J. Mescall
- Edited by: Rupert Julian
- Distributed by: Pathé Exchange
- Release date: May 21, 1928
- Running time: 62 minutes
- Country: United States
- Language: Silent (English intertitles)

Walking Back is a 1928 American silent drama film directed by Rupert Julian and an uncredited Cecil B. DeMille. Prints of the film exist.

== Plot ==
A young jazz hound, "Smoke" Thatcher, is failing his academic studies due to his fondness for partying and liquor. His foremost concern is to convince his pragmatic father to allow him to use the family car so he can accompany bob-haired flapper Patsy Schuyler to a ritzy party.

His father refuses to loan Smoke the car and chides him for lacking proper respect for authority, but his speech is interrupted by the maid announcing the arrival of the dad's private bootlegger. Undaunted, an enterprising Smoke steals the neighbor's car and drives to Patsy's house. He arrives too late. Patsy has already gone to the party with Smoke's arch-nemesis Pet Masters. Smoke nonetheless proceeds alone to the party and intrudes upon inebriated couples dancing the Charleston. Jealous and possessive, Smoke causes an ugly scene. Smoke convinces Patsy to leave with him, and they walk to the parking lot. While attempting to leave with Patsy in the stolen car, Smoke becomes engaged in an automobile battle against Masters which ends with the near ruin of both vehicles.

Smoke and Patsy drive the neighbor's wrecked car to a nearby garage. To pay for the considerable repairs, Smoke naively agrees to act as a chauffeur for several men on a routine trip. However, their trip is revealed to be a bank holdup, and Smoke's father is shot by the robbers. A remorseful Smoke foils the bank robbers by crashing their vehicle through a police station window and then confesses to his misdeeds.

== Cast ==
- Sue Carol as Patsy Schuyler
- Richard Walling as Smoke Thatcher
- Ivan Lebedeff as Beaut Thibaut
- Robert Edeson as Mr. Thatcher Sr.
- Jane Keckley as Mrs. Thatcher
- Florence Turner as Mrs. Schuyler
- James Bradbury Sr. as Gyp
- Arthur Rankin as Pet Masters
- Ray Cooke as Party Boy (uncredited)
- Joseph Depew (uncredited)
- Rupert Julian (uncredited)
- George Stone as Crook (uncredited)
- Billy Sullivan as Crook (uncredited)
- Florence Turner as Mrs. Schuyler (uncredited)

== Critical reception ==
The New York Times observed that the film is "about that younger [Jazz Age] generation whose status was originally promulgated by Scott Fitzgerald." The paper further observed that the film "is no worse than the general average of those dealing with wine, automobiles and the biological gropings of persons under the age of 24. As a matter of fact, it is a little better. Miss Carol, as Patsy, is pretty, and Mr. Walling, as Smoke, looks as though if he had the right opportunity to be intelligent, he might fool everyone."

Sidne Silverman wrote in Variety that the film captured the era's "jazz mad world" and was likely intended by Pathé Exchange to catapult Sue Carol's nascent career and to make her the new "It" Girl à la Clara Bow. Silverman asserted that the film's best sequence "is an auto duel between two youths over who is going to take the girl home. Youngsters start bumping and chasing each other around the yard until both cars are practically demolished."

Film Daily described Walking Back as a "drama of modern youth" and as "fair entertainment of youth and jazz made for the flapper and college vote." The newspaper noted that "they were making [this subgenre of film] two years ago along the same pattern" and, consequently, "nothing new has been added, but there is a certain freshness in the work of Sue Carol and especially Richard Walling that makes it fairly entertaining."
