= Elizabeth Pickett Chevalier =

American novelist

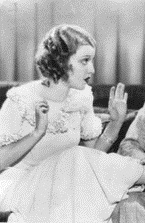
- Born: Elizabeth Pickett; March 25, 1896; Chicago, Illinois, USA
- Died: January 3, 1984 (aged 87); Los Angeles, California, USA
- Occupation: Screenwriter

Elizabeth Pickett Chevalier (1896-1984), known earlier in her career as Elizabeth Pickett, was an American writer best known for her 1942 novel, the bestseller Drivin' Woman, which was promoted as a novel in the vein of Gone with the Wind. In her earlier career, she was also a silent short-film director and a screenwriter who wrote scenarios and titles for Fox Film Corporation.

== Early life and education ==
Chevalier was born in Chicago in 1896, and was a granddaughter of Confederate States Army General George Pickett. Pickett took over her family's tobacco farm in Lexington, Kentucky, before graduating from Wellesley Women's College in 1918. At the end of the first World War, she went to work in Washington D.C., with the American Red Cross as a historian and publicist until eventually making propaganda shorts for the non-profit organization.

Pickett also contributed about 1,100 pages to the 1923 History of the American Red Cross. In her early work, she made a one-reel picture called In Florence Nightingale's Footsteps to try to persuade women to become war nurses. It was this event that swayed Pickett to pursue more work in film, so she began working for the Fox Film Corporation shortly afterwards.

== Film career ==
In her earlier career, Elizabeth Pickett was a silent short-film director and a screenwriter who wrote scenarios and titles for Fox Film Corporation. In 1923 she produced the very first "short series" films for Fox Film Corporation. Pickett helped to write and direct nearly forty "short series" films for Fox until eventually becoming the West Coast supervisor. Over the course of her career she edited and titled more than fifty Fox varieties. Pickett wrote several original stories such as Navajo and Wolf Fangs and adapted and titled works including Wings of the Storm, and The Monkey Talks. Other contributions she made in the film industry include titling and editing Kentucky Pride, Exploring the Amazon, Whispering Sage, The Shamrock Handicap, and Marriage License?

Pickett recalled that many aspects of her work as a novelist were influenced by her early work in film. In 1929 Paramount gave Pickett the opportunity to write the screenplay for her very first feature film, Redskin. Redskin was a fiction, high-quality technicolor film directed by Victor Schertzinger and produced and distributed by Paramount Famous Lasky. It was shot in authentic Pueblo and Navajo locations in both Western New Mexico and Arizona. The feature essentially represented the peak of Pickett's career in film even though it was criticized for all its habitual stereotyping of Native Americans. Before beginning to write the screenplay for Redskin Pickett spent months with Native Americans gathering information about their characteristics and behavior in order to gain better insight on their culture for the movie. Pickett said that her overall goal in the industry was to not only write and direct her own pictures but also to make an analogy between cinematography and film. Redskin was the first film that provided Pickett with the opportunity to achieve her goals and successfully write a feature film. She was described as having some of the highest ambitions to direct/write in film according to the Moving Picture World. With these goals in mind, many of Picket's films combined elements of both documentary and narrative fiction. Much of her work involved shooting Western American landscapes such as in Cliff-Dwellers of America (1925) and King of the Turf (1923). It was the short, King of the Turf that later inspired John Ford with his feature Kentucky Pride (1925), which Pickett also edited and titled.

== Novel ==
Pickett's novel Drivin' Woman (1942) was a bestseller that she dedicated to her husband Stuart Chevalier, a descendant of the family of J. E. B. Stuart. The story's setting is the South after the American Civil War and appeared to be modeled after Gone with the Wind. The plot focuses on the life of a girl who inherits a southern tobacco plantation. The movie rights to Drivin' Woman were sold to MGM for $60,000 before she finished writing it – probably in part due to the success of the film adaptation of Gone with the Wind; however, it was never made into a film.

== Later life ==
According to her UPI obituary, she served on the Board of Governors of the American Red Cross in 1952, and President-elect John F. Kennedy considered her for the post of United States Secretary of the Treasury in 1960 or 1961.

Her husband, attorney Stuart Chevalier, died in 1956. She died on January 3, 1984, at the age of 87, and was buried in Altadena, California.

== Quotes ==
"In this business of ours the writer will have to be the director as well, in order to survive". – Pickett

“I have written with the camera on some thirty or forty Varieties and I can see that the whole trend of production today, both from the standpoint of real economy and artistry, is with the person who writes with the camera”. – Pickett

== Filmography ==
=== Director ===
Year	Title
1918	American Red Cross propaganda shorts
1923	King of the Turf
1925	Rocky Mountain Gold
1925	Under Colorado Skies
1925	Cliff Dwellers of America

=== Writer ===
Year	Title	Contribution
1925	Kentucky Pride	titles
1926	The Shamrock Handicap	titles
1926	Marriage License?	titles
1926	The Silver Treasure	titles
1926	Wings of the Storm	titles
1927	Wolf Fangs	screenplay/story/titles
1928	Fleetwing	screenplay/story
1929	Redskin	screenplay/story
1952	Navajo	screenplay/story

=== Editor ===
Year	Title
1925	Kentucky Pride
1926	The Shamrock Handicap
1927	Marriage
1928	Fleetwing
