= Emmy of Stork's Nest =

1915 film by William Nigh

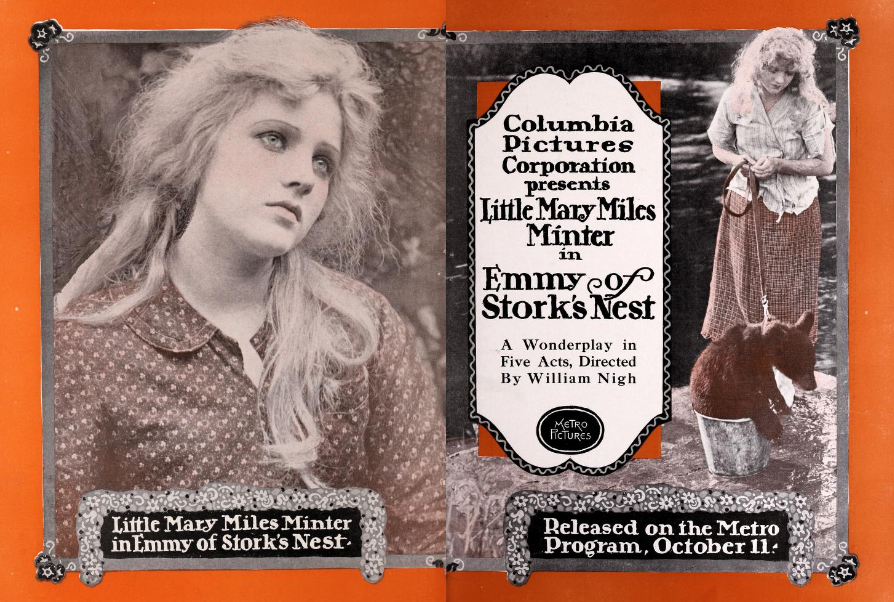
- Advertisement
- Directed by: William Nigh
- Based on: Stork's Nest by J. Breckenridge Ellis
- Starring: Mary Miles Minter
- Production company: Columbia Pictures Corporation
- Distributed by: Metro Pictures
- Release date: October 11, 1915 (United States)
- Running time: 5 reels
- Country: United States
- Languages: Silent; English intertitles

Emmy of Stork's Nest is a 1915 silent film directed by William Nigh and starring Mary Miles Minter. The film is based on the novel Stork's Nest by J. Breckenridge Ellis and was shot on location in the Pocono Mountains.

== Plot ==
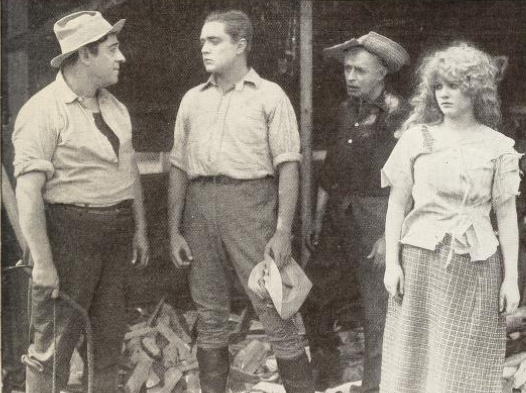
Still from "Emmy of Stork's Nest" (1915)

As described in Motography, Benton Cabot decides to make a living working the farm his father left him. At Stork's Nest he meets Emmy Garret, a beautiful little country girl. Bije Stork, a bully, is jealous of Cabot. He is determined to marry Emmy and persuades her that the city chap is not in love with her. Bije is sought by the sheriff for counterfeiting. He flees, taking Emmy, who has agreed to marry him, but Cabot overtakes the counterfeiter. When matters are explained to Emmy she gives her promise to become Benton's wife.

The October 23, 1915 edition of Picture-Play Weekly features a detailed fiction adaptation of the film, complete with several stills from the picture.

== Cast ==
- Mary Miles Minter as Emmy Garrett
- Niles Welch as Benton Cabot
- Charles Prince as Bije Stork
- William Cowper as Si Stork
- Mathilde Brundage as Crisshy Stork

== Preservation status ==
The film is a lost film.
