= Singed =

1927 film

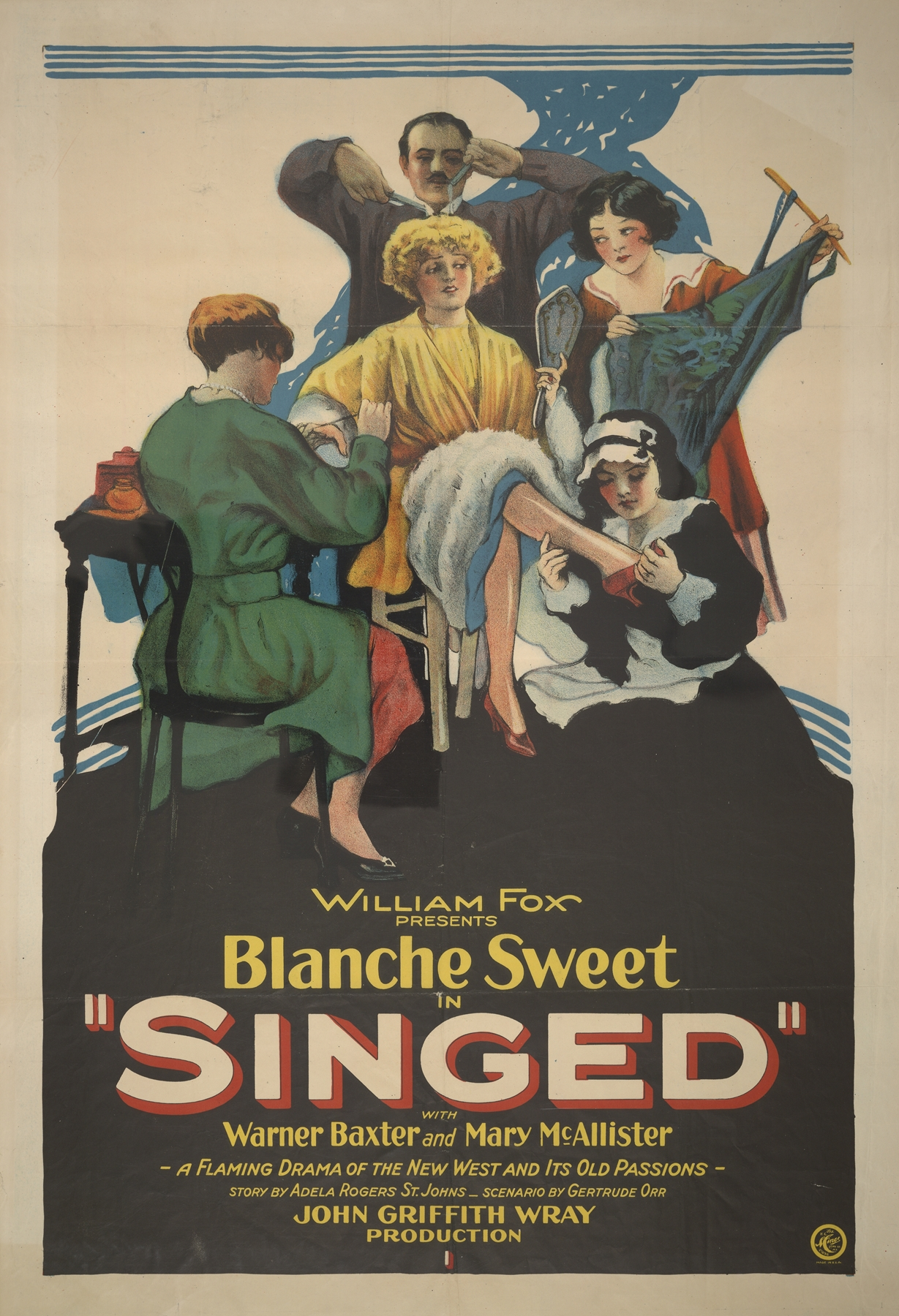
- 1927 theatrical poster
- Directed by: John Griffith Wray
- Written by: Gertrude Orr (scenario)
- Based on: "Love o' Women" by Adela Rogers St. Johns
- Produced by: William Fox
- Starring: Blanche Sweet; Warner Baxter
- Cinematography: Charles G. Clarke
- Distributed by: Fox Film Corporation
- Release dates: July 11, 1927 (New York City); August 23, 1927 (United States)
- Running time: 6 reels; (5,790.68 feet)
- Country: United States
- Language: Silent (English intertitles)

Singed is a 1927 American silent drama film produced and distributed by Fox Film Corporation. The film was directed by John Griffith Wray and stars Blanche Sweet. Singed is based on Adela Rogers St. Johns's story "Love o' Women".

== Cast ==
- Blanche Sweet as Dolly Wall
- Warner Baxter as Royce Wingate
- James Wang as Wong
- Alfred Allen as Jim
- Clark Comstock as Wes Adams
- Howard Truesdale as Indian Agent
- Claude King as Ben Grimes
- Ida Darling as Mrs. Eleanor Cardigan
- Mary McAllister as Amy Cardigan
- Edwards Davis as Howard Halliday
- Edgar Norton as Ernie Whitehead

== Production ==
Filming was done on location near Fullerton at the Brea-Olinda Oil Fields.

== Preservation ==
A print of Singed with Czech intertitles is preserved at the Museum of Modern Art in New York.

== See also ==
- Blanche Sweet filmography
