= A Most Immoral Lady =

1929 film

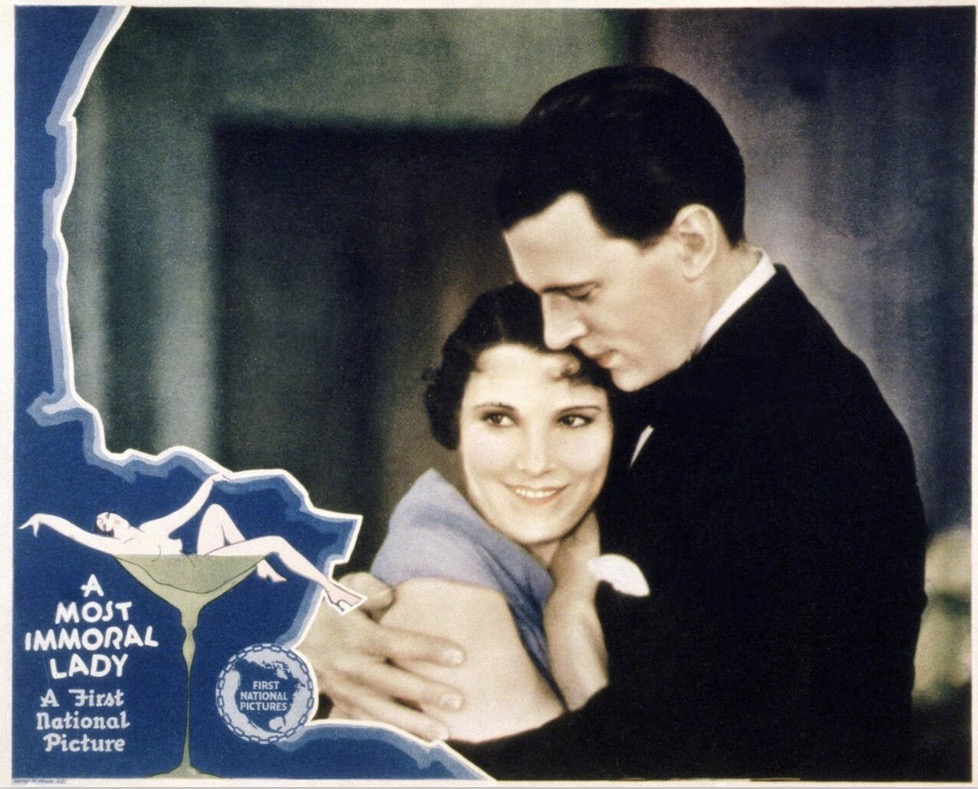
- Lobby Card
- Directed by: John Griffith Wray
- Screenplay by: Forrest Halsey
- Based on: A Most Immoral Lady by Townsend Martin
- Starring: Leatrice Joy; Walter Pidgeon; Sidney Blackmer; Montagu Love
- Cinematography: John F. Seitz
- Edited by: Peter Fritch
- Production company: First National Pictures
- Distributed by: Warner Bros. Pictures
- Release date: September 22, 1929
- Running time: 77 minutes
- Country: United States
- Language: English

A Most Immoral Lady is a 1929 American sound (All-Talking) drama film directed by John Griffith Wray and written by Forrest Halsey. It is based on the 1928 play A Most Immoral Lady by Townsend Martin. The film stars Leatrice Joy, Walter Pidgeon, Sidney Blackmer, Montagu Love, Josephine Dunn, and Robert Edeson. The film was released by Warner Bros. Pictures on September 22, 1929.

== Plot ==
Laura Sergeant, a sophisticated and enigmatic woman, receives a stock market tip from a wealthy admirer. Ostensibly, she uses the tip to help her husband, the scheming and weak-willed Humphrey Sergeant, pay off a loan from financier Bradford-Fish. But the tip turns out to be a setup, and Humphrey loses everything in the market crash.

Contrite and desperate, Laura is persuaded by Humphrey to join him in a blackmail scheme. Their first target is John Williams, a wealthy and influential man who falls for Laura's carefully crafted charm.

However, things become complicated when Laura meets and genuinely falls in love with John's nephew, the earnest and idealistic Tony Williams. Though she initially "plays" Tony as she has other men in the past, her affection for him becomes real. When Humphrey plots to entrap Tony in yet another scheme, Laura turns against her husband in an effort to save the young man she truly loves.

Her attempt comes too late—Tony, discovering Laura in a compromising situation orchestrated by Humphrey, believes he has been deceived. Worse still, when Tony's uncle John arrives and exposes the blackmail ring, Tony realizes he's just the latest in a string of men who've been manipulated by Laura and Humphrey. Disillusioned and hurt, Tony angrily breaks off with Laura and impulsively marries Joan Porter, a socialite who has long pursued him.

Heartbroken and alone, Laura leaves Humphrey for good and travels to Paris to get a divorce. There, she finds work as a singer at the Muscovite Café, attempting to rebuild her life. Months later, Laura is stunned when Tony and Joan unexpectedly visit the café where she is performing—alongside Joan's current companion, the gigolo Pedro.

Laura soon learns that Tony has seen through Joan's façade and is planning to divorce her. He now understands the truth about Laura and realizes that her feelings were always sincere. With Humphrey and Joan out of the picture, and their emotional wounds beginning to heal, Laura and Tony's love finally has a chance—offering a glimmer of hope and redemption for them both.

== Cast ==
- Leatrice Joy as Laura Sergeant
- Walter Pidgeon as Tony Williams
- Sidney Blackmer as Humphrey Sergeant
- Montagu Love as John Williams
- Josephine Dunn as Joan Porter
- Robert Edeson as Bradford-Fish
- Donald Reed as Pedro the Gigolo
- Florence Oakley as Natalie Davis
- Wilson Benge as Hoskins

== Music ==
The film featured two theme songs entitled "Toujours" and "That's How Much I Need You" which were both composed by Herman Ruby & M. K. Jerome. Two additional songs were unpublished. "If You Haven't The Right One To Love" was featured in the Paris sequence at the end of the film. An additional comedy song entitled "If I Get 'Em Under The Moon" was heard at the start of the film. "Toujours" was sung by Leatrice Joy and Walter Pidgeon while he played piano in the party scene that takes places in New York. "That's How Much I Need You" is sung at the start of the film by uncredited chorus girls. "If I Get 'Em Under The Moon" is sung by Leatrice Joy during the Palm Beach resort gardens sequence that follows this. During the sequence towards the end of the film that takes place in Paris in the Muscovite Cafe Leatrice Joy sings another song entitled "If You Haven't The Right One To Love."

== See also ==
- List of early sound feature films (1926–1929)
