= Hell's Four Hundred =

1926 film

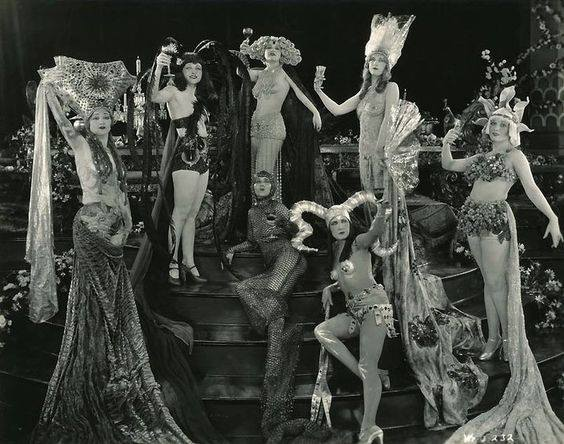
- Directed by: John Griffith Wray
- Written by: Bradley King
- Based on: "The Just and the Unjust" by: Vaughn Kester
- Produced by: William Fox
- Starring: Margaret Livingston; Harrison Ford; Henry Kolker
- Cinematography: Karl Struss
- Production company: Fox Film
- Distributed by: Fox Film
- Release date: March 14, 1926
- Running time: 60 minutes
- Country: United States
- Language: Silent (English intertitles)

Hell's Four Hundred, sometimes listed as Hell's 400, is a 1926 American silent drama film directed by John Griffith Wray and starring Margaret Livingston, Harrison Ford, and Henry Kolker. An allegorical dream sequence towards the end of the film where the Vance character visualizes her sins as monsters was shot using two-strip Technicolor.

== Plot ==
As described in a film magazine review, gold digging chorus girl Evelyn Vance seeks a rich daddy to take care of her. Evelyn marries the wealthy Marshall Langham thereby double-crossing her boss John Gilmore, who had schemed to use her to rope Marshall into a scandal because of the debts that he owed Gilmore. Gilmore is killed and district attorney John North, sworn enemy of Gilmore and his gambling empire, is held on circumstantial evidence. Evelyn could clear North of the crime, but in so doing she would expose her husband Marshall who is actually the guilty party. When Marshall is on his deathbed, he makes a final statement that clears North as he is engaged to his sister Barbara. At this point Evelyn has a vision in which each of her sins is materialized as a monster. Evelyn wakes and decides, at the final fade-out, to go to a picnic given by an iceman and not go after another rich daddy.

== Cast ==
- Margaret Livingston as Evelyn Vance
- Harrison Ford as John North
- Henry Kolker as John Gilmore
- Marceline Day as Barbara Langham
- Wallace MacDonald as Marshall Langham
- Rodney Hildebrand as Bill Montgomery
- Amber Norman as Vivian

== Preservation ==
With no prints of Hell's Four Hundred located in any film archives, it is a lost film.

== Bibliography ==
- Solomon, Aubrey. The Fox Film Corporation, 1915-1935: A History and Filmography. McFarland, 2011. ISBN 978-0-7864-6286-5
