= J. Breckenridge Ellis =

American novelist

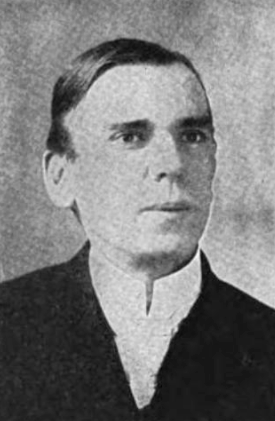
- Born: February 11, 1870; Hannibal, Missouri
- Died: April 2, 1956 (aged 86); New Cordell, Oklahoma
- Burial place: Greenlawn Cemetery, Plattsburg, Missouri
- Occupation: Writer

John Breckenridge Ellis (1870–1956) was an American writer.

== Biography ==
Ellis was born near Hannibal, Missouri, on February 11, 1870, but spent most of his life in Clinton County. He was the son of John W. Ellis, PhD. and Sallie Breckenridge Ellis.

In 1880, his father purchased Plattsburg College and the family moved to Plattsburg, Missouri where the elementary school still bears his name.

Ellis was a prolific writer, writing 26 works (primarily historical romances) which appeared in book form, besides numerous serials of book length which were published by national magazines.

His novel, Fran, was on the best seller list in America, and made into the 1919 film The Love Hunger. Several of his works were made into films and stage plays. He was president of the Missouri Writers' Guild.

During the 1900s and 1910s, Ellis supplied numerous serials to the Chicago Ledger. Many featured the recurring character Detective "Keeneyes".

Ellis' writing is of the Stanley Weyman school. His romances were pithy and understated, artfully avoiding the affectations and pretensions of many of his contemporaries.

He died at his home in New Cordell, Oklahoma, on April 2, 1956, and was buried at Greenlawn Cemetery in Plattsburg.

== Novels ==
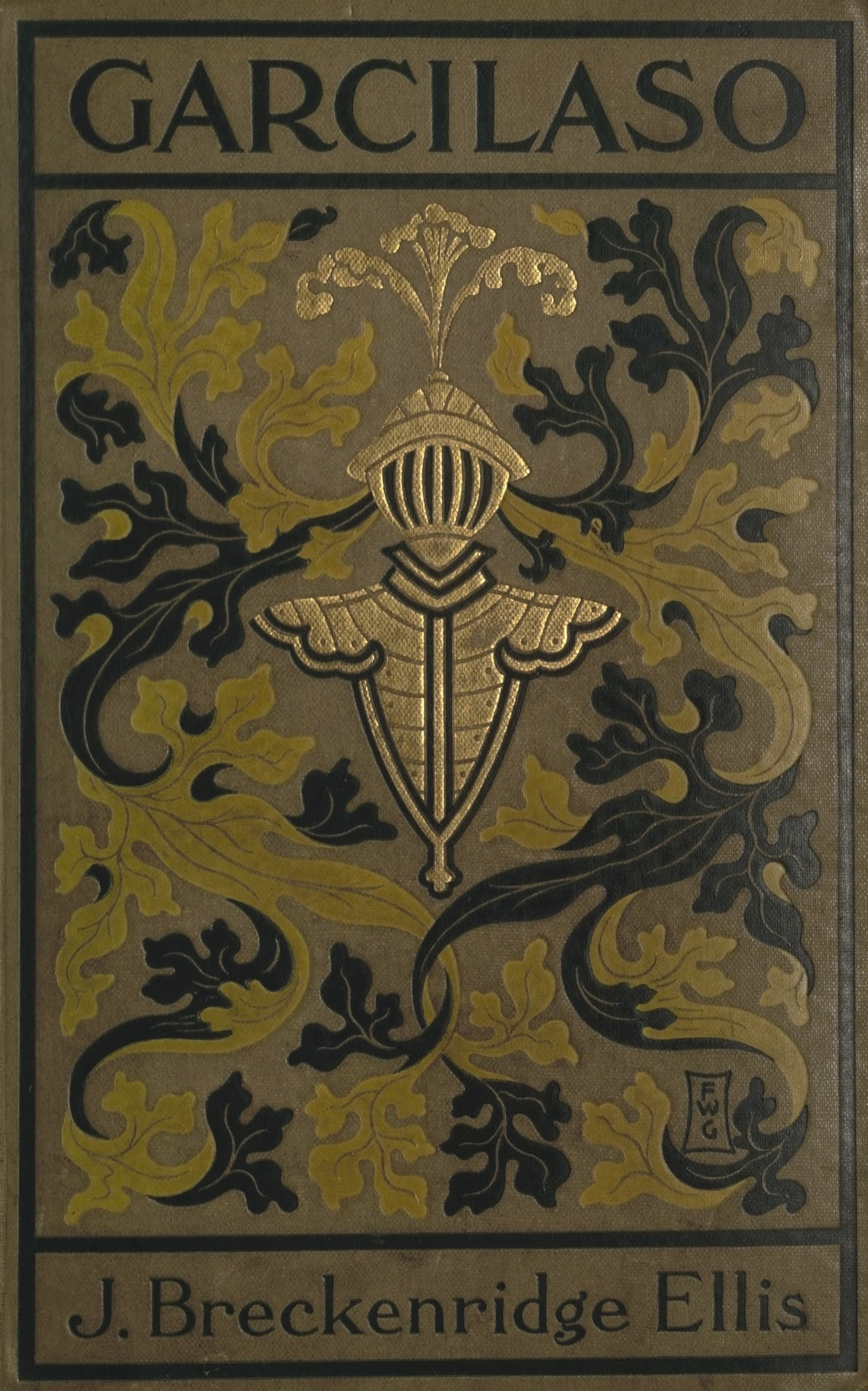
Cover of Garcilaso (1901)

- The Dread and Fear of Kings (1900)
- Garcilaso (1901)
- The Holland Wolves (1902)
- Stork's Nest (1905)
- Adnah: a tale of the time of Christ (1907)
- The Soul of a Serf : A Romance of Love and Valor among the Angles and Saxons (1910)
- Fran (1912)
- Lahoma (1913)
- Little Fiddler of the Ozarks (1913)
- The Picture on the Wall (1920)

== Films based on his novels ==
- Emmy of Stork's Nest (based on Stork's Nest) (1915)
- The Love Hunger (based on Fran) (1919)
- Lahoma (1920)
- Cinderella of the Hills (based on Little Fiddler of the Ozarks) (1921)
- The Shadow on the Wall (based on The Picture on the Wall) (1925)

== See also ==
- List of bestselling novels in the United States in the 1910s
