= Gertrude Orr =

American screenwriter

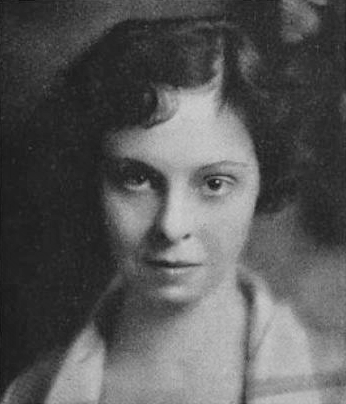
- Born: January 17, 1891; Covington, Kentucky, USA
- Died: August 1971 (aged 80); Washington, District of Columbia, USA
- Occupation(s): Screenwriter, author
- Spouse: Harold Eugene Martin (m. 1929, divorced)

Gertrude Orr (1891–1971) was an American screenwriter who worked primarily at Fox in the 1920s and 1930s. Her best-known films include Call of the Yukon and The Blind Goddess.

== Biography ==
Orr was born in Covington, Kentucky, the youngest of four children born to John Orr and Luella Roberts. The family relocated to Denver, Colorado, when she was young.

Orr began her career writing for The Denver Post; her first assignment was writing obituaries. After moving to Hollywood and starting at Fox in the publicity department, she soon worked her way into the writing department; in 1925, she was the only woman on that team.

Orr also wrote a biography of famed circus tiger trainer Mabel Stark called Hold That Tiger in 1938.

She married Harold Eugene Martin on November 9, 1929. The marriage ended in divorce.

== Partial filmography ==
- Smilin' at Trouble (1925)
- Bertha, the Sewing Machine Girl (1926)
- The Blind Goddess (1926)
- The Loves of Carmen (1927)
- Marriage (1927)
- Married Alive (1927)
- Singed (1927)
- A Woman Against the World (1928)
- The Mad Parade (1931)
- Little Men (1935)
- Without Children (1935)
- Country Gentleman (1936)
- The Harvester (1936)
- The Mandarin Mystery (1936)
- Call of the Yukon (1938)
- Slander House (1938)
