= John Griffith Wray =

American film director

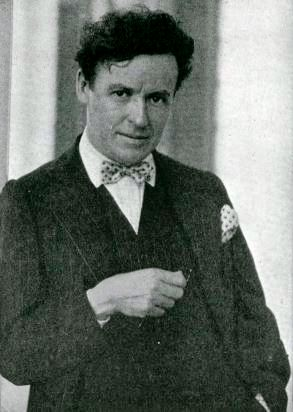
- Wray in 1924
- Born: August 30, 1881; Minneapolis, Minnesota
- Died: July 15, 1929 (aged 47); Los Angeles, California
- Spouses: Virginia Brissac (m. 1915; div. 1927) Bradley King (m. 1928)

John Griffith Wray (August 30, 1881 – July 15, 1929) was an American stage actor and director who later became a noted Hollywood silent film director. He worked on 19 films between 1913 and 1929 that included Anna Christie (1923) and Human Wreckage (1923).

== Biography ==
Wray was born in Minneapolis, Minnesota, and died in Los Angeles, California. By 1912 Wray was a leading actor and stage director with the World's Fair Stock Company's yearlong Hawaiian tour. He married actress Virginia Brissac in Santa Ana, California, on June 29, 1915, and became the step-father of screenwriter Ardel Wray. The couple divorced in 1927. In October 1928, less than a year before his death, Wray married Bradley King, a Hollywood screenwriter.

== Selected filmography ==
- The Shark God (1913 film)
- Homespun Folks (1920)
- Lying Lips (1921)
- Beau Revel (1921)
- Hail the Woman (1921)
- Human Wreckage (1923)
- Soul of the Beast (1923)
- What a Wife Learned (1923)
- Her Reputation (1923)
- Anna Christie (1923)
- The Marriage Cheat (1924)
- The Winding Stair (1925)
- Hell's Four Hundred (1926)
- The Gilded Butterfly (1926)
- Singed (1927)
- The Gateway of the Moon (1928)
- The Careless Age (1929)
- A Most Immoral Lady (1929)
