= Marriage (novel) =

1912 novel by H. G. Wells

- First edition (UK)
- Author: H. G. Wells
- Language: English
- Genre: Novel
- Publisher: Macmillan (UK); Duffield & Co. (US)
- Publication date: 1912
- Publication place: United Kingdom
- Pages: 551

Marriage is a 1912 novel by H. G. Wells.

== Plot summary ==
Marriage features two protagonists: Marjorie Pope, the oldest daughter of a carriage manufacturer whose business has been ruined by the advent of the automobile, and R.A.G. Trafford, a physicist specializing in crystallography whom she marries against the wishes of her family at the age of 21. The novel traces the history of their relationship, which begins when an early airplane Trafford is piloting crashes into the garden of a house Marjorie's family is renting for the summer.

Marjorie ("Madge") and Trafford ("Rag") make great efforts to understand and accommodate the other. On Trafford's part, this leads to his abandonment of scientific research and his involvement with industrial commerce. He makes his fortune by applying himself to synthetic rubber. But he grows more and more disenchanted with his abandonment of his commitment to a life lived for truth. Marjorie's social ambitions gradually alienate him, and he decides to leave everything behind him and think things out in the wilderness of Labrador. His widowed mother persuades him to take Marjorie with him, and leaving their home and four children behind they undertake to survive the winter in the wilderness. There they nearly perish, but they save their marriage by winning their way through to a satisfactory mutual understanding. The novel ends as they are returning to London to undertake, together, a critical engagement with the world. Trafford intends to devote himself to writing a book entitled From Realism to Reality, which is to be "a pragmatist essay, a sustained attempt to undermine the confidence of all that scholasticism and logic chopping which still lingers like the sequelae of a disease in our University philosophy," while Marjorie intends to devote herself to being "his squaw and body-servant first of all, and then—a mother."

== Themes ==
The novel treats satirically the absurd artificiality of Edwardian literature, reform movements, social life, and so on. The social sphere that Wells portrays in Marriage is that of the wealthy bourgeoisie. But the novel preaches no particular political ideology, and its dénouement finds Trafford embracing and Marjorie accepting a diagnosis according to which humanity's fundamental problem is "the new, astonishing riddle of excessive power" and a religious philosophy according to which "Salvation's a collective thing and a mystical thing—or there isn't any."

== Criticism ==
At 551 pages, Marriage is one of H.G. Wells's longest novels. Biographers have noted that Wells drew on his own experiences in describing Trafford's situation, but the inner life of this chaste hero bears little resemblance to Wells's own turbulent private life.

Wells serialized the novel in the U.S. in the American Magazine from November 1911 to October 1912. His need for income made him concerned when sales of the novel fell off after the first six months. Reviews of the complex novel were mixed but mostly positive.

== Screen adaptations ==
John M. Siddall of the American Magazine inquired about making a film version of the novel in 1919, and the rights to it were sold to Goldwyn Pictures in the early 1920s. A 56-minute film was released in 1927, with Alan Durant starring as Trafford and Virginia Valli playing Marjorie. In the film, Trafford leaves Marjorie and goes to Africa on a research expedition, and Marjorie follows him and wins back his love. No prints of this film are known to survive.
