= Archelaus Marius Woodson =

American judge (1854–1917)

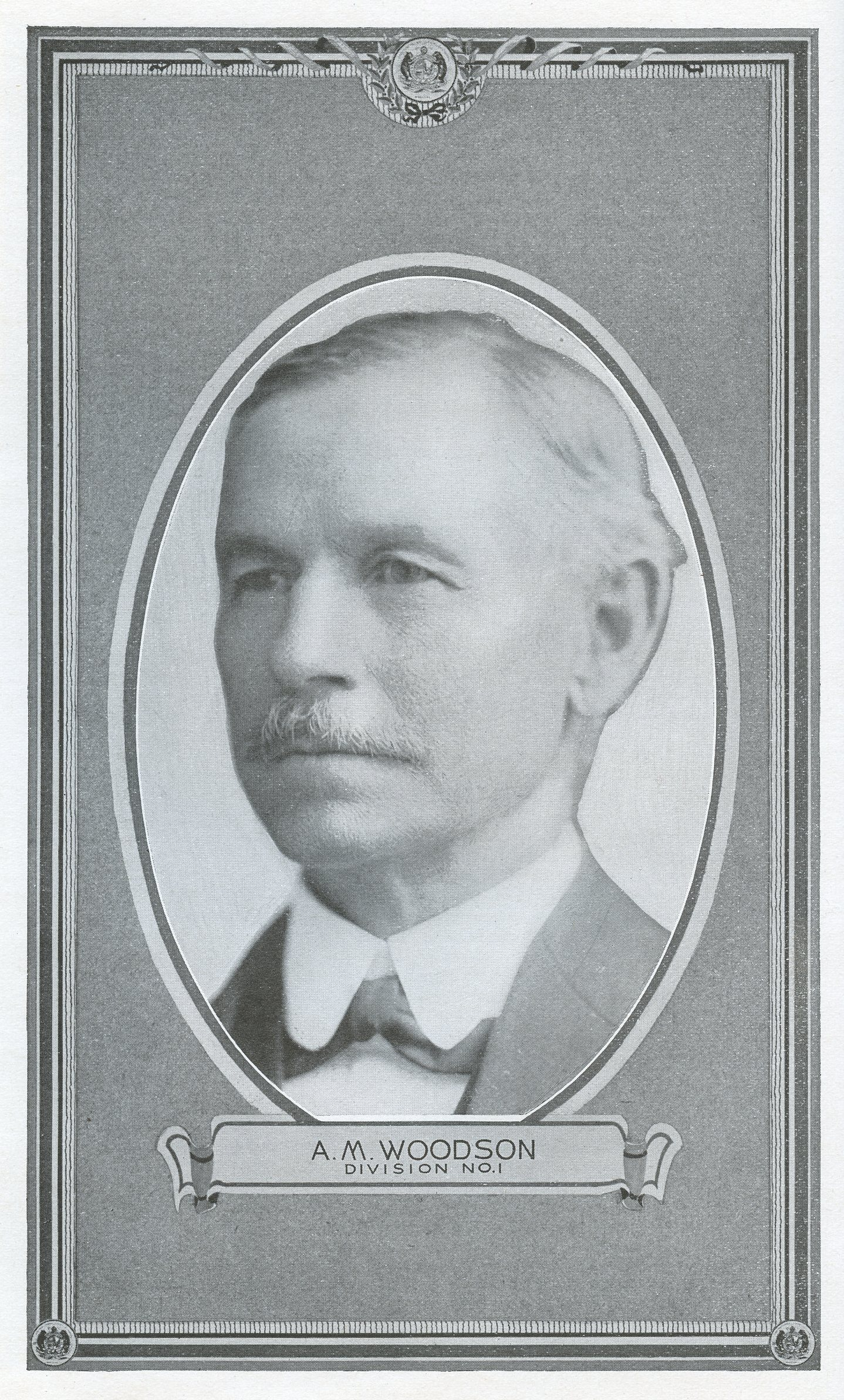
Woodson in 1917.

Archelaus Marius Woodson (January 30, 1854 – November 15, 1925) was a justice of the Supreme Court of Missouri from 1907 to 1925.

== Early life and education ==
Born in Knox County, Kentucky to Benjamin Woodson, brother of Silas Woodson, the family moved to Missouri in October 1854, settling on a farm near Lexington, in Lafayette County, Missouri. The following year, the family moved to Buchanan County, settling near Sparta. Woodson grew up on the farm, and "there received the rudiments of his education, attending the district school in winter and assisting with the farm work in summer". Woodson attended the county schools, and in 1873, Woodson entered Plattsburg College in Plattsburg, Clinton County, Missouri, where he remained until entering Washington University School of Law in 1876, from which he graduated in 1877.

He gained admission to the bar in Platte City in April, 1876, a year before his graduation from law school. He developed a practice in St. Louis, but in 1883 moved back to Platte City for a year, and then to St. Joseph, Missouri.

== Judicial service ==
On December 18, 1889, Governor David R. Francis appointed Woodson to a two-year term as Circuit Judge of Buchanan County, to which Woodson was reelected to a six-year term in 1892, and to another six-year term in 1898. As a district court judge, he "made a reputation for fairness", and "displayed profound legal lore".

Woodson was elected to the Supreme Court of Missouri in November 1906, and was reelected in 1916. One historian said that Woodson "had the good fortune of writing one of the great libertarian opinions of his court in the course of an otherwise undistinguished career", Ex Parte Nelson. He was also noted to have written opinions ousting Standard Oil for antitrust violations, and preventing Democratic state officials from redistricting the state into senatorial districts. He twice served as Chief Justice, due to the court rotating the office among the justices. He remained on the court until his death.

== Personal life ==
On April 13, 1886, Woodson was married Elizabeth Oliver at Platte City, with whom he had three children.

Woodson died of cardiac asthma in a hospital in Kansas City, Missouri, at the age of 71.

Political offices
Preceded by Theodore Brace	Justice of the Missouri Supreme Court; 1907–1925	Succeeded by Robert William Otto
