= John Barrymore =

American actor (1882–1942)

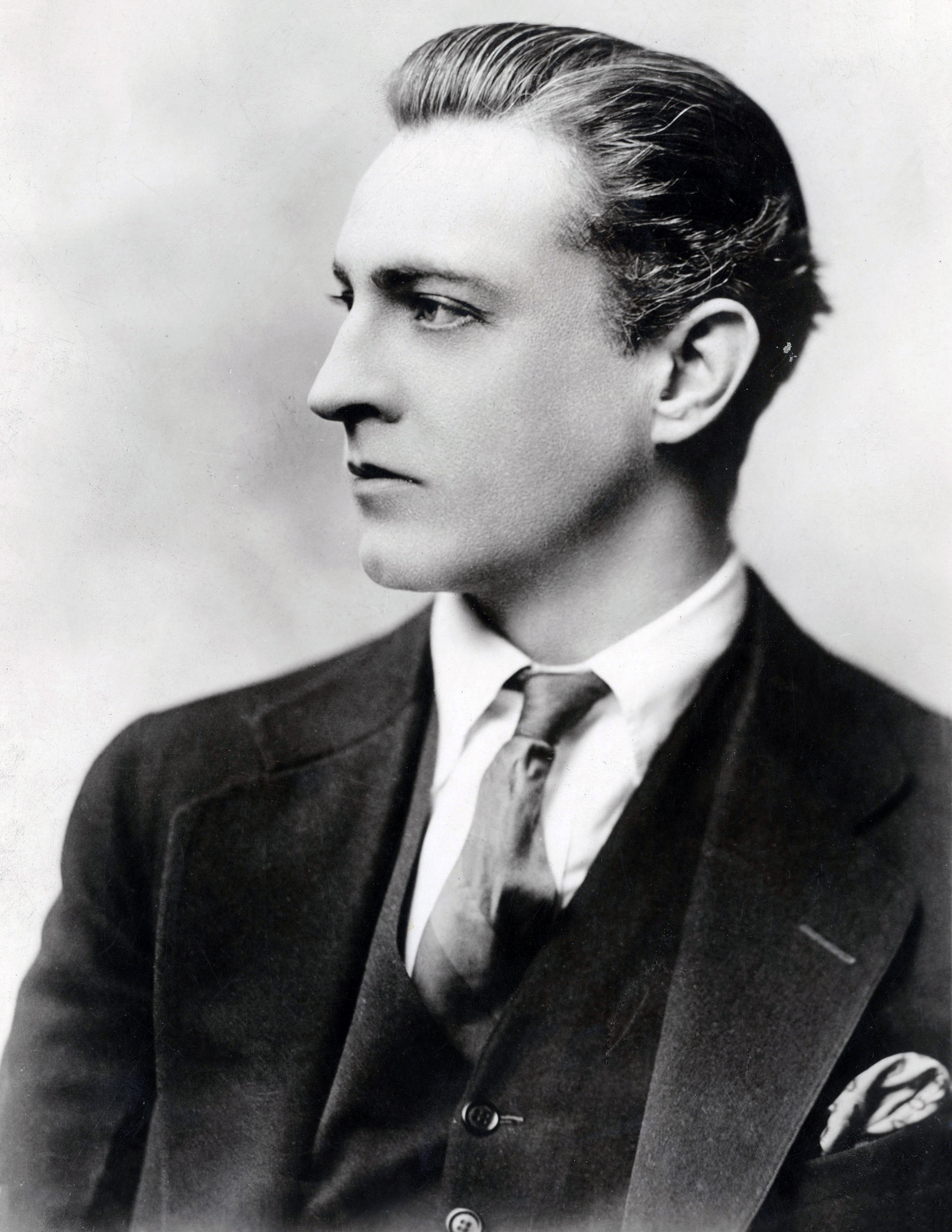
- Barrymore in 1918
- Born: John Sidney Blyth; February 14 or 15, 1882; Philadelphia, Pennsylvania, U.S.
- Died: May 29, 1942 (aged 60); Los Angeles, California, U.S.
- Occupation: Actor
- Family: Barrymore; Drew

John Barrymore (born John Sidney Blyth; February 14 or 15, 1882 – May 29, 1942) (Note: Although the Barrymore family bible gives the date as February 15, the birth certificate states February 14.) was an American actor on stage, screen, and radio. A member of the Drew and Barrymore theatrical families, he initially tried to avoid the stage and briefly attempted a career as a visual artist, but appeared on stage together with his father, Maurice, in 1900, and then his sister Ethel the following year. He began his career in 1903 and first gained attention as a stage actor in light comedy, then high drama, culminating in productions of Justice (1916), Richard III (1920), and Hamlet (1922); his portrayal of Hamlet led to him being called the "greatest living American tragedian".

After a success as Hamlet in London in 1925, Barrymore left the stage for 14 years and instead focused entirely on films. In the silent film era, he was well received in such pictures as Dr. Jekyll and Mr. Hyde (1920), Sherlock Holmes (1922), and The Sea Beast (1926). During this period, he gained his nickname, the Great Profile. His stage-trained voice proved an asset when sound films were introduced, and four of his works, Grand Hotel (1932), Dinner at Eight (1933), Twentieth Century (1934), and Midnight (1939), have been inducted into the National Film Registry.

Barrymore's personal life has been the subject of much attention before and since his death. He struggled with alcohol abuse from the age of 14, was married and divorced four times, and declared bankruptcy later in life. Much of his later work involved self-parody and the portrayal of drunken has-beens. His obituary in The Washington Post observed that "with the passing of the years – and as his private life became more public – he became, despite his genius in the theater, a tabloid character." Although film historians have opined that Barrymore's "contribution to the art of cinematic acting began to fade" after the mid-1930s, Barrymore's biographer, Martin Norden, considers him to be "perhaps the most influential and idolized actor of his day".

== Biography ==
=== Early life: 1882–1903 ===
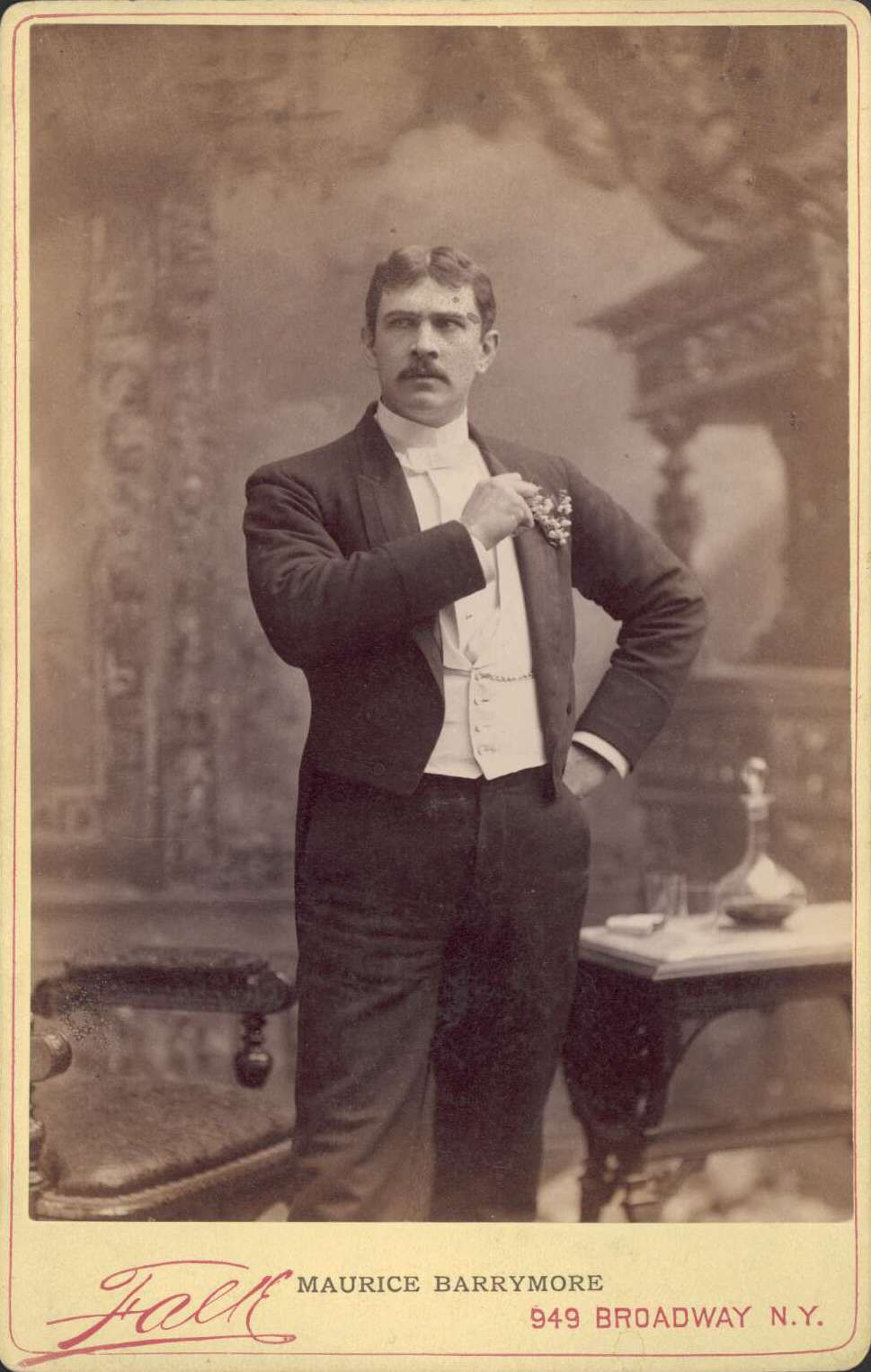
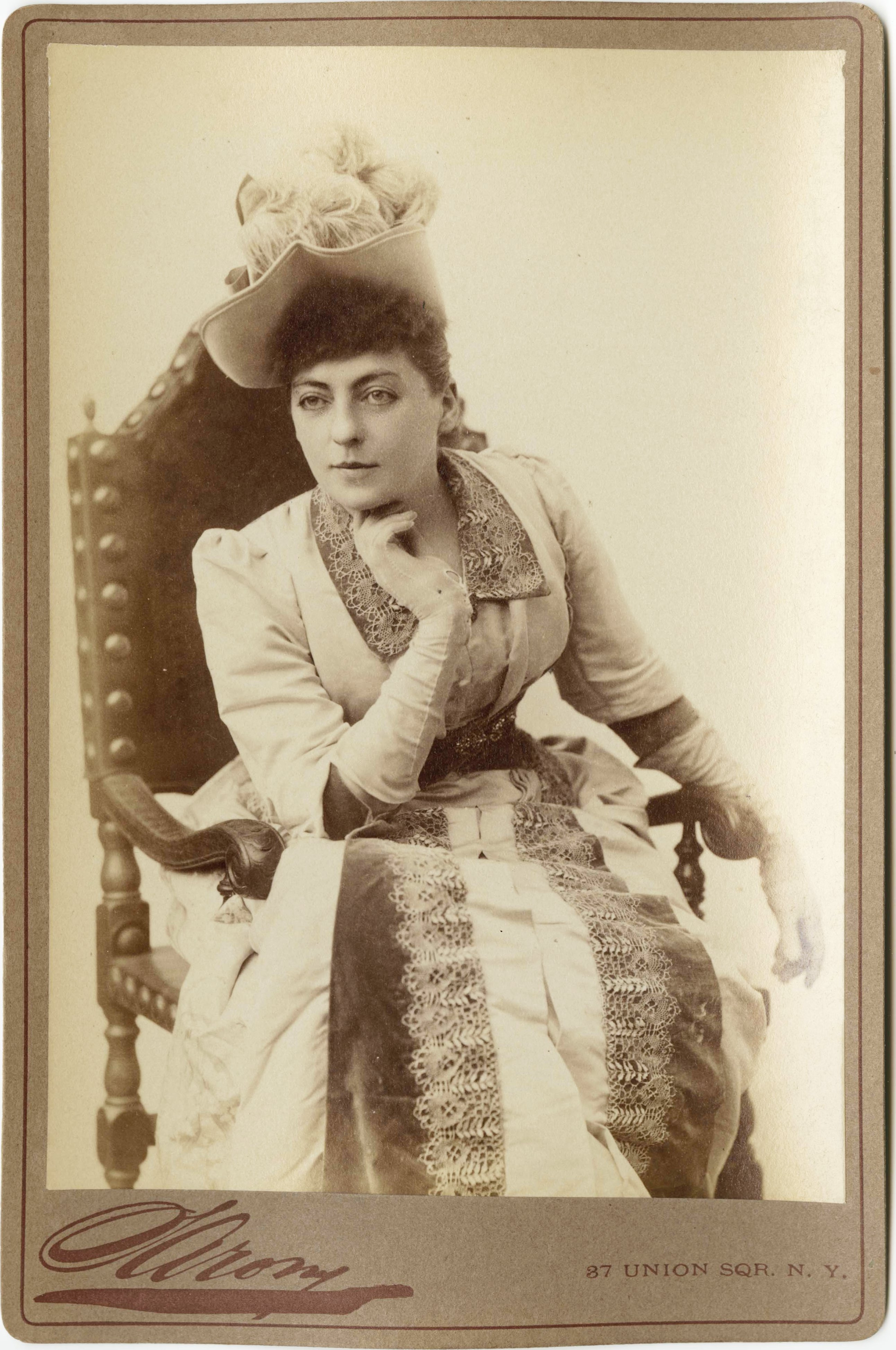
Maurice and Georgiana, Barrymore's parents

Barrymore was born John Sidney Blyth in the Philadelphia home of his maternal grandmother Louisa Lane Drew and was known by family, friends and colleagues as "Jack". Although the Barrymore family Bible puts his date of birth as February 15, 1882, his birth certificate shows February 14. He was the youngest of three children. His siblings were Lionel (1878–1954), and Ethel (1879–1959). His father was Maurice Barrymore, an Indian-born British actor who had been born Herbert Blyth, and had adopted Barrymore as a stage name after seeing it on a poster in the Haymarket Theatre in London. Barrymore's mother, Georgie Drew, was born into a prominent theatrical family. His maternal grandparents were Louisa Lane Drew, a well-known 19th-century American actress and the manager of the Arch Street Theatre, and John Drew, also an actor whose specialty was comedy. (Note: John Drew died in 1862 when Barrymore's mother was 6.) Barrymore's maternal aunt and uncles were more thespians, John Drew Jr., Sidney Drew, and Georgiana Kinlock.

Much of Barrymore's early life was unsettled. In October 1882, the family toured in the US for a season with Polish actress Helena Modjeska. The following year his parents toured again with Modjeska but left the children behind. Modjeska was influential in the family, and she insisted that all three children be baptized into the Catholic Church. In 1884 the family traveled to London as part of Augustin Daly's theatrical company, returning to the US two years later. As a child, Barrymore was sometimes badly behaved, and he was sent away to schools in an attempt to instill discipline. The strategy was not always successful, and he attended elementary schools in four states. He was sent first to the boys' annex of the Convent of Notre Dame in Philadelphia. One punishment that he received there was being made to read a copy of Dante's Inferno; he later recounted that, as he looked at the illustrations by Gustave Doré, "my interest was aroused, and a new urge was born within me. I wanted to be an artist". He was expelled from the school in 1891 and was sent to Seton Hall Preparatory School in New Jersey, where Lionel was already studying. Barrymore was unhappy at Seton and was soon withdrawn, after which he attended several public schools in New York, including the Mount Pleasant Military Academy.

In 1892, his grandmother Louisa Drew's business began to suffer, and she lost control of her theater, causing disruption in the family. The following year, when Barrymore was 11 years old, his mother died from tuberculosis; her consistent touring and his absence at school meant that he barely knew her, and he was mostly raised by his grandmother. The loss of their mother's income prompted both Ethel and Lionel to seek work as professional actors. Barrymore's father was mostly absent from the family home while on tour, and when he returned he would spend time at The Lambs, a New York actors' club.

In 1895, Barrymore entered Georgetown Preparatory School, then located on Georgetown University Campus, but he was expelled in November 1897, probably after being caught waiting in a brothel. One of his biographers, Michael A. Morrison, posits the alternate theory that Barrymore was expelled after the staff saw him inebriated. By the time he left Georgetown he was, according to Martin Norden in his biography of Barrymore, "already in the early stages of a chronic drinking problem". (Note: A 1934 doctor's report stated: "Since the age of 14 has been more or less a chronic drunkard.") 1897 was an emotionally challenging year for Barrymore: he lost his virginity when he was seduced by his step-mother, Mamie Floyd, (Note: Maurice had remarried in 1894, a year after the death of his first wife; Floyd was the 28-year-old daughter of family friends.) and in August his grandmother, the main female role model in his life, died.

Barrymore traveled with his father to England in 1898, where he joined King's College School, Wimbledon. A year later he joined the Slade School of Fine Art, to study literature and art. After a year of formal study, he left and "devoted much of his subsequent stay in London to bohemianism and nocturnal adventures", according to family biographer Margot Peters. Barrymore returned to New York in the summer of 1900, and by November he found work as an illustrator on The New York Evening Journal, at a salary of $50 a week.

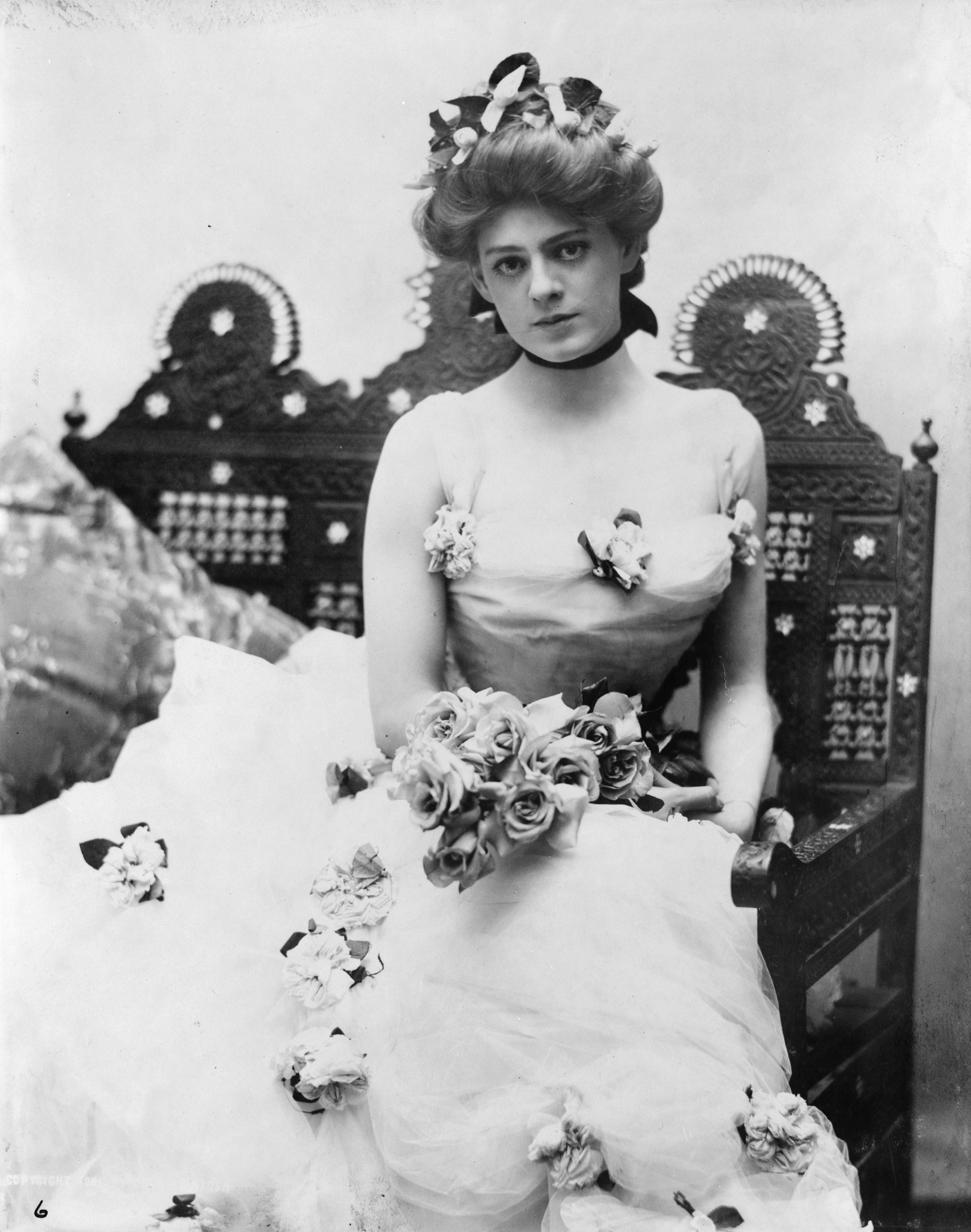
Ethel in Captain Jinks of the Horse Marines; Barrymore appeared with his sister in the 1901 play.

Barrymore had always professed a dislike of the acting profession, but in 1900 he was persuaded by his father to join him on stage for a few performances of a short play, "A Man of the World" which his father had produced in Fort Lee, New Jersey near his home in town. He appeared in the same piece again the following year, but he still thought of the experience as merely a way to supplement his income, rather than as a possible future career. In October 1901, Ethel was appearing in Philadelphia in Captain Jinks of the Horse Marines when one of the younger actors became temporarily unavailable. She persuaded the director to allow Barrymore to accept the part of the minor character, and Barrymore traveled from New York, learning his lines on the train. In the first act, he stopped in the middle of his dialogue, unable to remember the text, and asked the audience and his fellow actors, "I've blown up. Where do we go from here?", which led the cast to improvise the remainder of the scene.

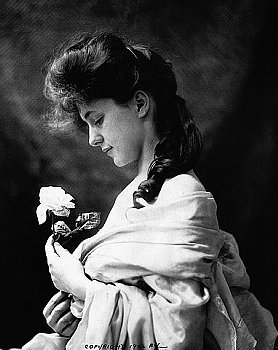
Evelyn Nesbit, Barrymore's first love, to whom he proposed in 1902 (photograph by Rudolf Eickemeyer Jr., 1905)

An incident in 1901 had a major impact on Barrymore. In March, his father had a mental breakdown as a result of tertiary syphilis, and Barrymore, after a discussion with Ethel and gaining a court petition, took him to Bellevue Hospital. Maurice was later transferred to a private institution in Amityville, Long Island, where he suffered a "rapid descent into madness". (Note: Maurice remained institutionalized until his death in March 1905; his children were regular visitors.) The Encyclopedia of World Biography states that Barrymore was constantly "haunted by the bright and dark spell of his father", and his close friend Gene Fowler reported that "the bleak overtone of this breaking of his parents' reason never quite died away in Barrymore's mind, and he was haunted by fears he would suffer the same fate". Barrymore became fascinated with the beautiful artists' model, "Florodora girl" and aspiring actress named Evelyn Nesbit, who was a mistress of the prominent New York architect Stanford White and was 16 or 17 years old at the time. The two had a romantic affair in 1902, and Barrymore proposed marriage to her. Nesbit's mother did not think that, as a struggling artist who seemed irresponsible with money, Barrymore was a good match for her daughter. To break off their relationship her mother and White sent Nesbit away to school in New Jersey in November 1902. Barrymore later described Nesbit as "the most maddening woman", saying "She was the first woman I ever loved." A few years later in 1906, White was shot and killed by Nesbit's then-husband, the mentally unstable Pittsburgh millionaire heir Harry K. Thaw, who she had married in 1905. Nesbit later testified that White had drugged and raped her when she was 15 or 16 (shortly before she met Barrymore) and that she had told Thaw about it, leading Thaw to become obsessed with White and enraged about his acceptance in society. The trial of Thaw for murder was the focus of extreme press interest and was one of the first to be dubbed the "Trial of the Century". It was speculated that Barrymore could be called to testify at the trial due to his prior relationship with Nesbit. Thaw was eventually found not guilty by reason of insanity.

In May 1902, Barrymore was fired from his newspaper position after producing a poor illustration for the paper while hung over. He spent time as a poster designer but realized it was not lucrative enough for his lifestyle, which was being partly financed by Ethel, who was also paying for their father's care. While discussing his future with his brother, Barrymore said "it looks as though I'll have to succumb to the family curse, acting", and he later admitted that "there isn't any romance about how I went on stage. ... I needed the money."

=== Early stage career: 1903–1913 ===
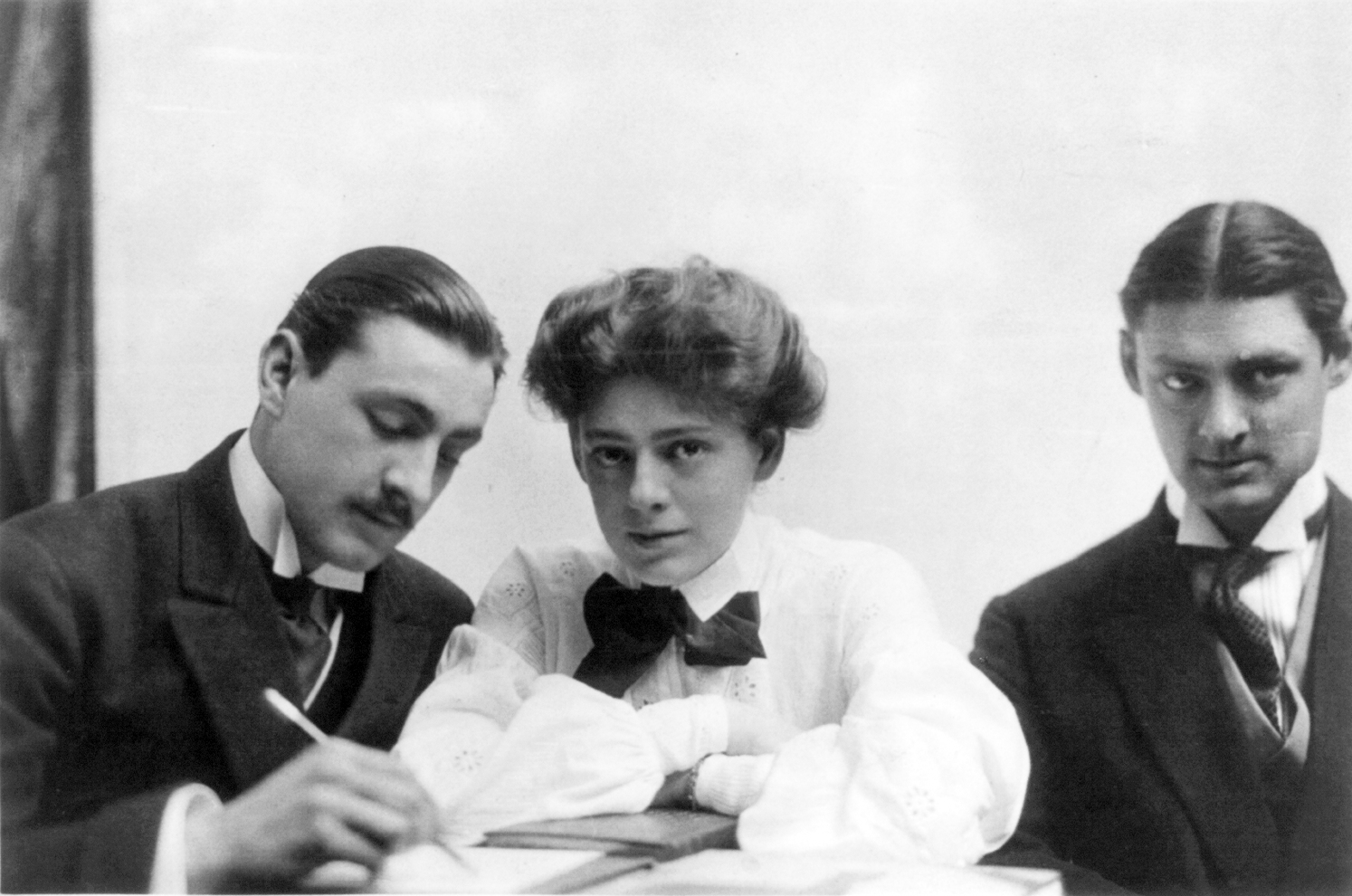
(l to r) Barrymore with his sister Ethel and brother Lionel in 1904. (Note: Film critic Hollis Alpert, in his 1964 biography on the Barrymores, opines that this is two images blended as one, as the trio were seldom photographed together early in their careers.)

Barrymore began to contact his family's theatrical connections to find work and approached Charles Frohman, who had been the producer of Captain Jinks and had also been an employer of Barrymore's mother Georgie a decade earlier. Frohman thought that Barrymore had comedic potential but needed more experience before making a Broadway debut. Barrymore joined the company of McKee Rankin, Sidney Drew's father-in-law, on the Chicago leg of their tour, at the W. S. Cleveland Theatre in October 1903. He first played the minor role of Lt. Max von Wendlowski in Magda, and in November when the troupe produced Leah the Forsaken, he took the small part of Max, a village idiot with one spoken line.

A year later Barrymore appeared in his first Broadway production, in a small role in the comedy Glad of It, which only had a short run. Afterwards he played the role of Charles Hyne in the farce The Dictator at the Criterion Theatre, which starred William Collier. During the play's run and subsequent tour across the US, Collier became a mentor to the young actor, although his patience was continually tested by Barrymore's drinking, which led to occasional missed performances, drunken stage appearances, and general misbehavior. Collier taught Barrymore much about acting, including coaching him in comic timing, but "at times regretted his sponsorship" of his apprentice. In March 1905, while The Dictator was playing in Buffalo, Barrymore's father died in Amityville and was buried at Glenwood Cemetery in Philadelphia. At the close of the US tour, The Dictator visited Britain from April 1905, where it played at the Comedy Theatre. The critic for The Observer wrote that Barrymore "admirably seconded" Collier.

When he returned to America, Barrymore appeared at the Criterion Theatre in a double bill of works by J. M. Barrie; he played a clown in Pantaloon opposite his brother, and Stephen Rollo in Alice Sit-by-the-Fire opposite his sister. Both plays ran for 81 performances from December 1905, and then went on tour. Barrymore continued drinking and lacked discipline, which affected his performances. Ethel was angry with her brother and had the producers fire him from the show, but re-hire him the following day, to teach him a lesson. After a tour of the US and Australia with Collier in On the Quiet and The Dictator, Barrymore joined his sister in the 1907 comedy His Excellency the Governor at the Empire Theatre. (Note: While in San Francisco in The Dictator, Barrymore was caught in the 1906 earthquake; he was thrown into the bath by the first shock. He helped troops to clear the roads. John Drew wryly noted that "it took a convulsion of Nature to get him into a bathtub and the United States Army to make him work".) He received mixed reviews for his performances, and The Wichita Daily Eagle commented that "Barrymore seems to imitate John Drew too much ever to be a good actor. Why doesn't young Barrymore imitate a real actor if he must copy someone."

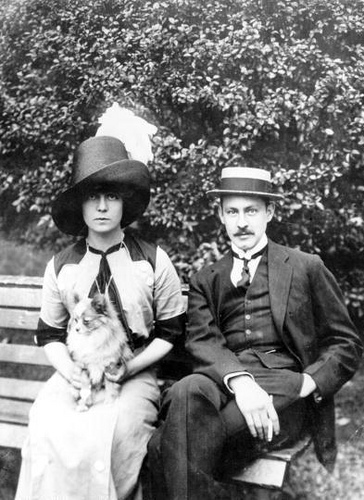
Barrymore with his first wife, actress Katherine Corri Harris, in 1911

Barrymore gained his first leading role in early 1907, in the comedy The Boys of Company B at the Lyceum Theatre. Although he was well received by the critics – The Washington Post noted that "his work has been pronounced astonishingly clever by the critics wherever he played" – at times he continued his unprofessional stage behavior, which led to a rebuke from John Drew, who attended a performance. After a short run in Toddles at the Garrick Theatre, Barrymore was given the lead role of Mac in A Stubborn Cinderella, both on tour and at the Broadway Theatre in Boston. He had previously been earning $50 a week during his sporadic employment but now enjoyed a wage increase to $175. (Note: $50 in 1908 is equivalent to approximately $1,300 in 2014; $175 in 1908 equates to approximately $4,500 in 2014.) He briefly appeared in The Candy Shop in mid-1909, before he played the lead role in Winchell Smith's play The Fortune Hunter at the Gaiety Theatre in September the same year. It was his longest-held role, running for 345 performances until May 1911, initially at the Gaiety Theatre in New York, and then on tour. The critic for The New York Times thought the play was, "acted with fine comedy spirit by John Barrymore ... [who] gave indisputable signs last night of grown and growing powers."

In mid-1910 Barrymore met socialite Katherine Corri Harris, and the couple married in September that year. Harris' father objected to the relationship and refused to attend the wedding. Shortly after the ceremony, The Dictator went on tour, and Harris was given a small role in the play. According to Peters, Barrymore "began to think of his marriage as a 'bus accident'". Film critic Hollis Alpert wrote that, within a week of the wedding, Katherine was complaining that she saw her new husband too infrequently. Barrymore's increasing dependence on alcohol was also a cause of marital problems, and he explained that "unhappiness increased the drink, and drink increased the unhappiness".

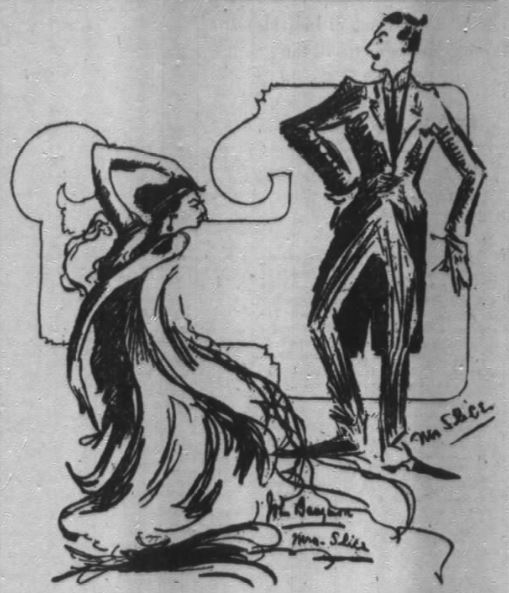
Barrymore's drawing of himself and Ethel in A Slice of Life, 1912

Barrymore's next two plays – Uncle Sam and Princess Zim-Zim, both from 1911 – were critically and commercially weak, but the second work introduced him to playwright Edward Sheldon, who would "reshape ... [Barrymore's] entire career". In January 1912, Barrymore appeared together with his sister in A Slice of Life at the Empire Theatre on Broadway, which ran for 48 performances. Charles Darnton, a critic for The Evening World, observed that "Barrymore takes delight in 'kidding' his part not only to the limit, but perhaps beyond". A review in The Washington Times stated that "Barrymore inimitably imitates his uncle John Drew".

Barrymore may have appeared in his first films in 1912. In four short films, a cast member is listed as "Jack Barrymore"; this is probably John Barrymore, although Norden notes that "we may never know for certain if [these] are in fact Barrymore movies." The four films were Dream of a Motion Picture Director, The Widow Casey's Return, A Prize Package (all 1912) and One on Romance (1913). The films were produced by the Philadelphia-based Lubin Manufacturing Company and were lost in an explosion and fire at the Lubin vaults in 1914.

In July 1912, Barrymore went to Los Angeles, where he appeared in three short-running plays at the Belasco Theatre. (Note: The three plays were On the Quiet, The Honor of the Family and The Man from Home.) He returned to New York in October, where he took the lead role in 72 performances of the comedy The Affairs of Anatol at the Little Theatre. Although the critical response was lukewarm, Barrymore's salary for the play was $600 a week. (Note: $600 in 1912 is approximately equal to $14,500 in 2014.) He began the following year by appearing in a short run of A Thief for a Night in McVicker's Theatre, Chicago, before returning to New York, and the Thirty-Ninth St. Theatre, for a two-month run in Believe Me, Xantippe.

=== Entry into motion pictures, and theatrical triumphs: 1913–1924 ===
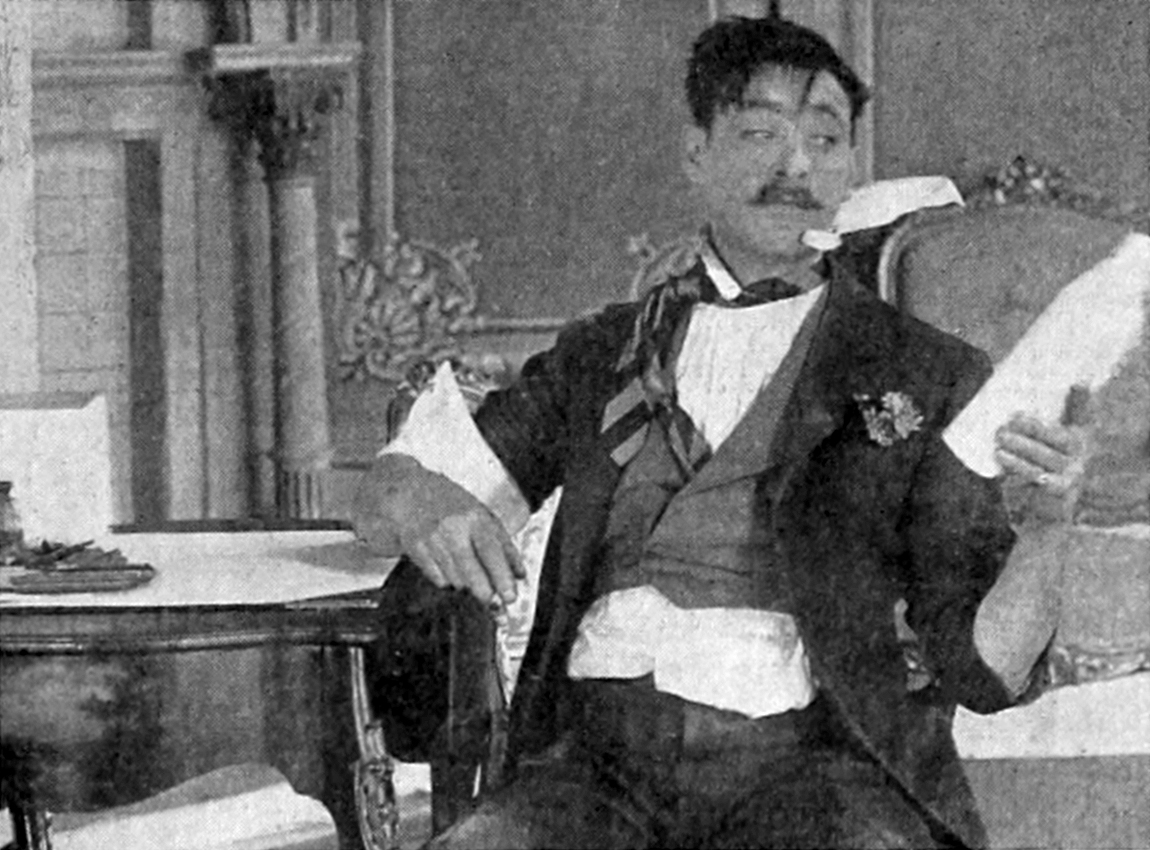
Barrymore in the 1914 romantic comedy An American Citizen, his first feature film

In late 1913, Barrymore made his first confirmed feature film, the romantic comedy An American Citizen, with Adolph Zukor's Famous Players Film Company. When the film was released in January 1914, Barrymore "delighted movie audiences with an inimitable light touch that made a conventional romance 'joyous'," writes Peters. A reviewer for The Oregon Daily Journal thought that Barrymore gave a "portrayal of unusual quality". The success of the picture led to further film work, including The Man from Mexico (1914), Are You a Mason?, The Dictator and The Incorrigible Dukane (all 1915). Except for The Incorrigible Dukane, all of these early films are presumed lost.

Despite the film work and the higher fees he earned from it, Barrymore continued to seek stage work, and in January 1914 he played the lead in The Yellow Ticket at New York's Eltinge Theatre. The role marked a departure from the light comedy of his previous performances, a result of Sheldon urging him to turn towards more dramatic parts. The Yellow Ticket was not the breakthrough that Barrymore wanted. A few months before the outbreak of World War I, he took a vacation to Italy with Sheldon to enjoy a temporary break from his worsening marriage. He returned from Italy and accepted another serious stage role, that of an ex-convict in Kick In, at New York's Longacre Theatre. The play was a success, and Barrymore received praise from the critics; The New York Times reviewer thought that in a play that had "uncommonly able and sincere playing", Barrymore acted his role with "intelligence and vigor and impart[ed] to it a deal of charm".

Barrymore spent the second half of 1915 making three films, including The Red Widow, which he called "the worst film I ever made" in his 1926 autobiography. (Note: The other two were Nearly a King and The Lost Bridegroom.) In April 1916, he starred in John Galsworthy's prison drama Justice, again at the instigation of Sheldon. The play was a critical success, and The New York Times thought the audience saw "Barrymore play as he had never played before, and so, by his work as the wretched prisoner in Justice, step forward into a new position on the American stage." The critic went on to say that Barrymore gave "an extraordinary performance in every detail of appearance and manner, in every note of deep feeling ... a superb performance."

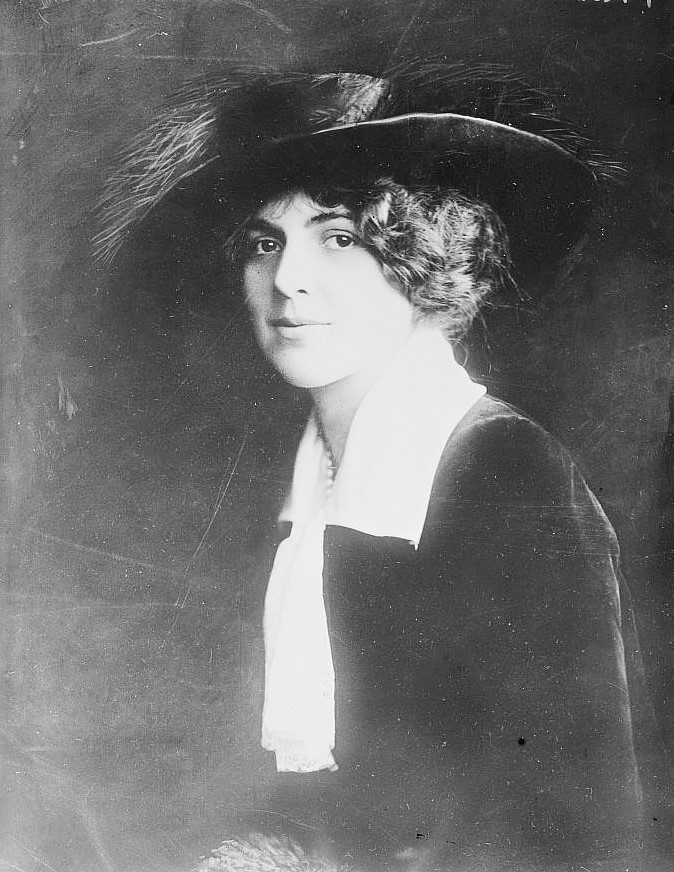
Blanche Oelrichs, Barrymore's second wife (and mother of Diana Barrymore), who published poetry under the pseudonym Michael Strange

From early 1916, Barrymore had been living apart from Katherine, and she sued for divorce in November 1916. (Note: The couple remained close, and when Katherine died of pneumonia at the age of 36, Barrymore was at her bedside.) By the time the divorce was finalized in December 1917, he had taken the lead role in the film Raffles, the Amateur Cracksman. He had also tried to enlist in the U.S. Army following the country's entry into World War I, but Army doctors discovered that he had varicose veins, and he was not accepted for military service. For over a year beginning in April 1917, he appeared together with Lionel in a stage version of George du Maurier's 1891 novel Peter Ibbetson. The play and the two Barrymores were warmly regarded by the critics. Around this time, Barrymore began a relationship with a married mother of two, Blanche Oelrichs, a suffragist from an elite Rhode Island family with what Peters calls "anarchistic self-confidence". Oelrichs also published poetry under the name Michael Strange. While their relationship began in secret, it became more open after Oelrichs' husband was commissioned into the army and then posted to France.

Both Oelrichs and Sheldon urged Barrymore to take on his next role, Fedya Vasilyevich Protasov, in Leo Tolstoy's play Redemption at the Plymouth Theatre. The critic for The New York Times felt that, although Barrymore's performance was "marred by vocal monotony", overall the performance was "a distinct step forward in Mr. Barrymore's artistic development ... There is probably not another actor on our stage who has a temperament so fine and spiritual, an art so flexible and sure." In 1918, Barrymore starred in the romantic comedy film On the Quiet; the Iowa City Press-Citizen considered the film superior to the original Broadway performance.

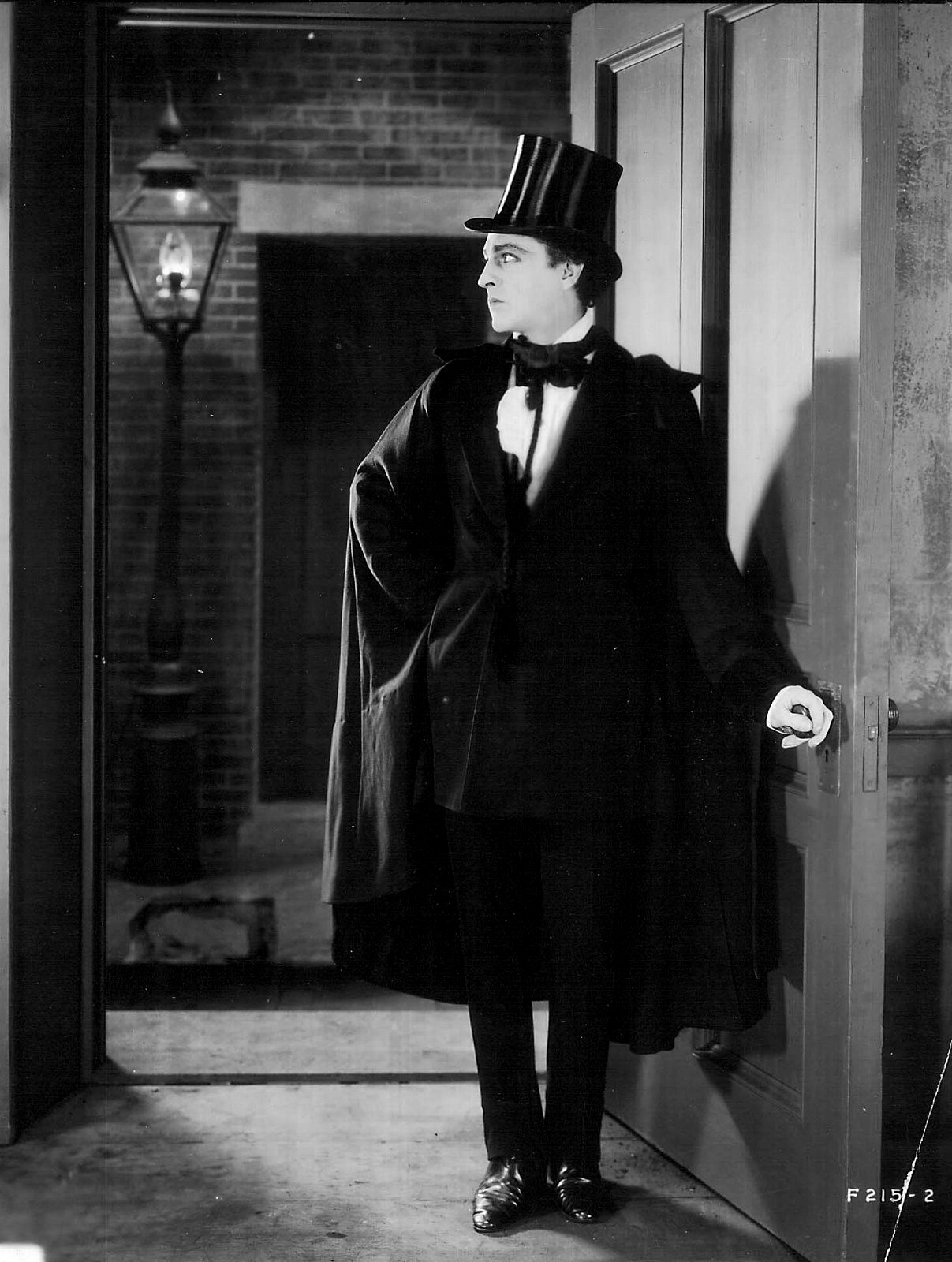
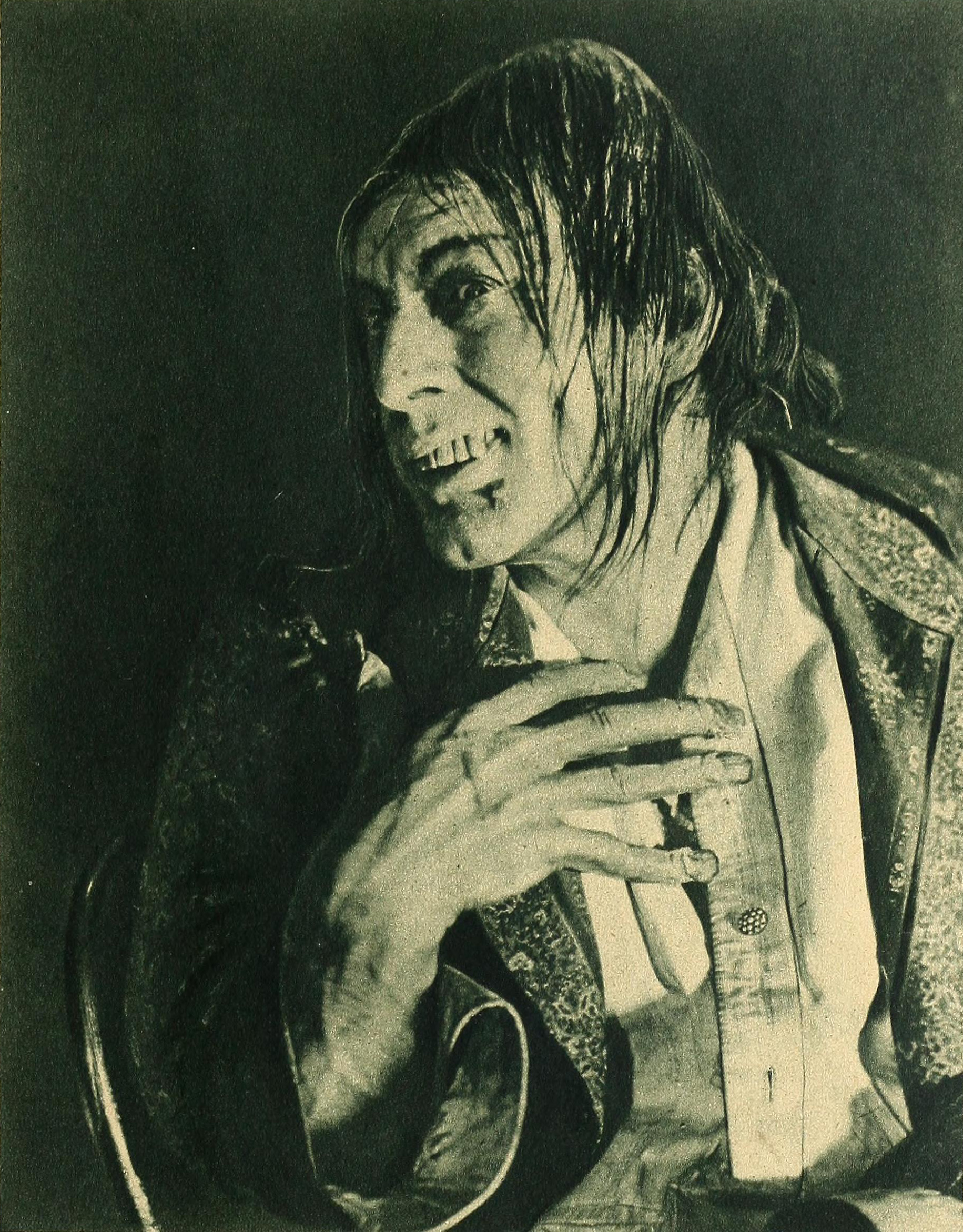
Barrymore as Jekyll (left) and Hyde (right) in Dr. Jekyll and Mr. Hyde (1920)

In 1919, Barrymore portrayed a struggling lawyer in the film adaptation of the Broadway show Here Comes the Bride, which he followed with The Test of Honor. The latter film marked his first straight dramatic role on screen after years of performing in comedy dramas. Later that year, when Barrymore again appeared on stage with Lionel in Sem Benelli's historical drama The Jest, audience members "agree[d] that the American stage had never witnessed finer acting", according to Peters. Alexander Woollcott, writing in The New York Times, thought that "John and Lionel Barrymore hold spellbound each breathless audience", and he commented that Barrymore "contributes to that appeal by every step, every hand, every posture of a body grown unexpectedly eloquent in recent years".

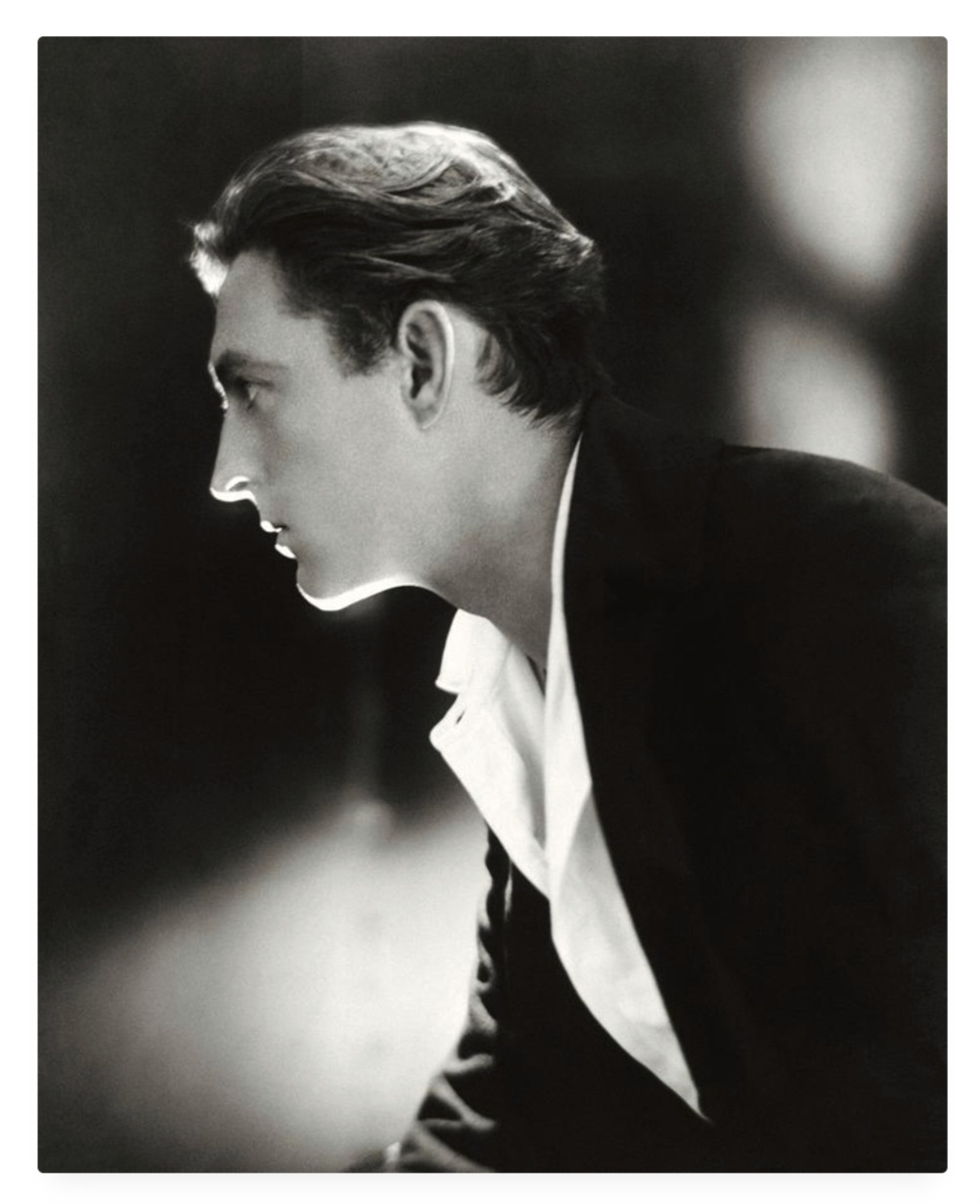
Portrait by Adolph de Meyer for Vanity Fair (1920)

In November, Barrymore began filming Dr. Jekyll and Mr. Hyde, playing the dual leading role, and the film was released in theaters the following year. Wid's Daily thought that "it is the star's picture from the very outset, and it is the star that makes it", going on to say that Barrymore's portrayal was "a thing of fine shadows and violent emotions". The Washington Post was in agreement, and considered the performance to be "a masterpiece", and "a remarkable piece of work". The film was so successful that the US Navy used stills of Barrymore in its recruiting posters.

After planning for over a year – largely in secret – Barrymore played his first Shakespeare part, the title role in Richard III. Conscious of the criticism of his vocal range, he underwent training with Margaret Carrington, the voice and diction trainer, to ensure he sounded right for the part, and the pair worked together daily for up to six hours a day for six weeks. After the debut in March 1920, the critics were effusive in their praise. The Washington Herald observed that the audience were "held by the sheer power of Barrymore's performance", which was "remarkable for ... [the actor's] unexpected vocal richness", while Woollcott, in The New York Times, thought the performance "marked a measurable advance in the gradual process of bringing [Barrymore's] technical fluency abreast with his winged imagination and his real genius for the theatre".

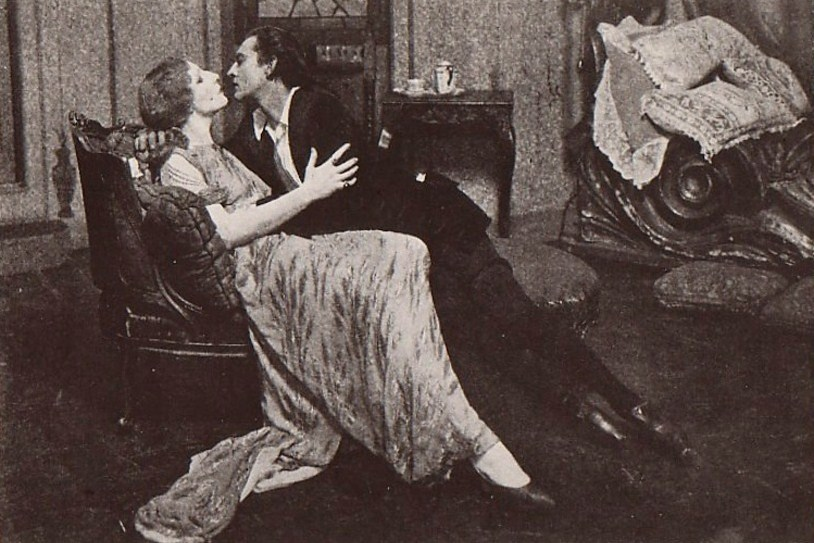
Barrymore with Violet Kemble-Cooper in the 1921 play Clair de Lune

Although a commercial and critical success, the play closed after 31 performances when Barrymore collapsed, suffering a nervous breakdown. Since appearing in Redemption he had worked ceaselessly, appearing on stage in the evenings, while planning or rehearsing the next production during the day, and by the time he appeared as Richard, he was spending his daytimes filming Dr. Jekyll and Mr. Hyde. He spent six weeks recuperating under the ministrations of his father's friend, wrestler William Muldoon, who ran a sanitarium. During the summer of 1920, Oelrichs became pregnant with Barrymore's child, and a quick divorce was arranged with her husband, which left her and Barrymore free to marry in August that year; a daughter, Diana Barrymore, followed in March 1921. (Note: Coincidentally, the same doctor who was at the birth of Barrymore's first wife also delivered Oelrichs, a few hours later, on October 1, 1890.) Soon after the birth, he began rehearsals for Clair de Lune, which his wife had adapted from Victor Hugo's 1869 novel The Man Who Laughs. Barrymore persuaded Ethel to play the role of the Queen – it was the first time the two had appeared on stage together in over a decade. The play was a critical flop, although the presence of the siblings ensured that it ran for over 60 performances.

In 1921, Barrymore portrayed a wealthy Frenchman in New York in the film The Lotus Eater, with Colleen Moore. In September, Barrymore and Oelrichs went to Europe on holiday; cracks were appearing in their relationship, and she fell in love with a poet during their extended stay in Venice. In October, Oelrichs returned to New York and Barrymore traveled to London to film the exterior scenes for his latest movie, Sherlock Holmes, in which he played the title role. He then returned to New York to work on the film's interior scenes in January 1922. Barrymore became involved in the pre-production work for the film and provided designs for Moriarty's lair. The film was released later that year and was generally thought "a little dull and ponderous, with too many intertitles", although James W. Dean of The Evening News of Harrisburg opined that "the personality of Barrymore is the film's transcendent quality".

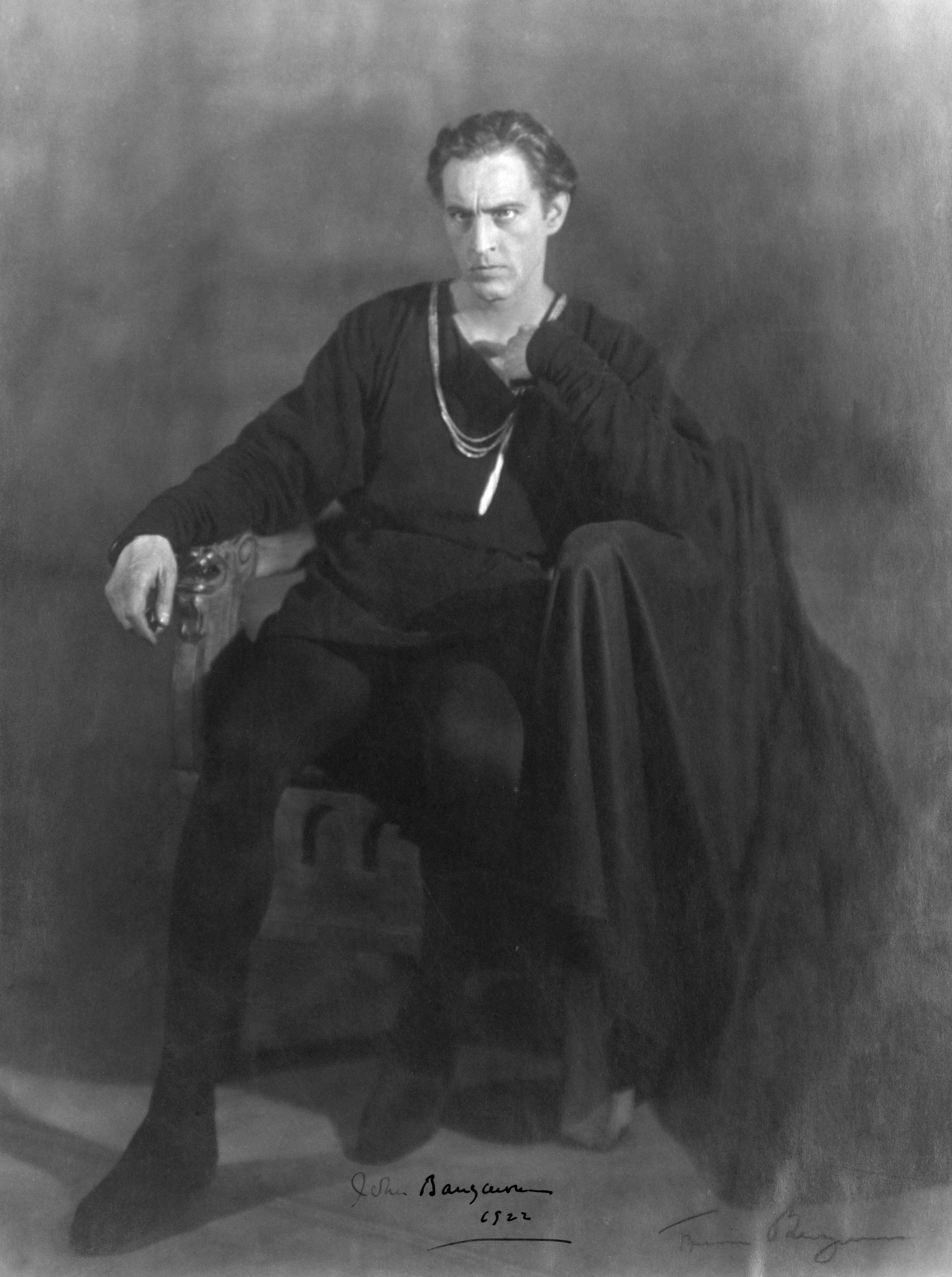
Barrymore as Hamlet (1922).

Barrymore decided next to star in Hamlet on stage, with Arthur Hopkins directing. They spent six months preparing, cutting over 1,250 lines from the text as they did so, and Barrymore opted to play Hamlet as "a man's man", according to Norden. Barrymore later described his Hamlet as a "normal, healthy, lusty young fellow who simply got into a mess that was too thick for him ... he was a great fencer, an athlete, a man who led an active, healthy life. How can you make a sickly half-wit out of a man like that?" Barrymore again used Carrington as a vocal coach; rehearsals started in October, and the play opened on November 16, 1922. The production was a box-office success, and the critics were lavish in their praise. Woollcott, writing for the New York Herald, opined that it was "an evening that will be memorable in the history of the American theater". while John Corbin, the drama critic for The New York Times, agreed, writing that "in all likelihood we have a new and a lasting Hamlet". The reviewer for Brooklyn Life stated that Barrymore had "doubtless won the right to be called the greatest living American tragedian". In 1963, Orson Welles said that Barrymore was the best Hamlet he had seen, describing the character as "not so much princely – he was a man of genius who happened to be a prince, and he was tender, and virile, and witty, and dangerous".

Barrymore and Hopkins decided to end the run at 101 performances, just breaking the record of one hundred by Edwin Booth, before the play closed in February 1923. (Note: The record lasted until 1936 when it was broken by John Gielgud. He recorded that "My New York Hamlet broke the Broadway record for continuous performances [of that play] previously set by Barrymore – 101 performances. In fact my record held until Richard Burton broke it in the 1960s, in a production directed by me, which seemed a little ironic.") In November and December that year, a three-week run of the play was staged at the Manhattan Opera House, followed by a brief tour that closed at the end of January 1924.

=== Films with the major studios: 1924–1932 ===
News of Barrymore's success in Hamlet piqued the interest of Warner Bros., which signed him as the lead in the 1924 film Beau Brummel. Unhappy in his marriage, Barrymore – aged 40 at the time – sought solace elsewhere and had an affair with his 17-year-old co-star Mary Astor during filming. Although the film was not an unqualified success, the cast, including Barrymore, was generally praised. Around this time, Barrymore acquired the nickname "the Great Profile", as posters and photographs of him tended to favor the left-hand side. He later said: "The right side of my face looks like a fried egg. The left side has features that are to be found in almost any normal anthropological specimen, and those are the apples I try to keep on top of the barrel."

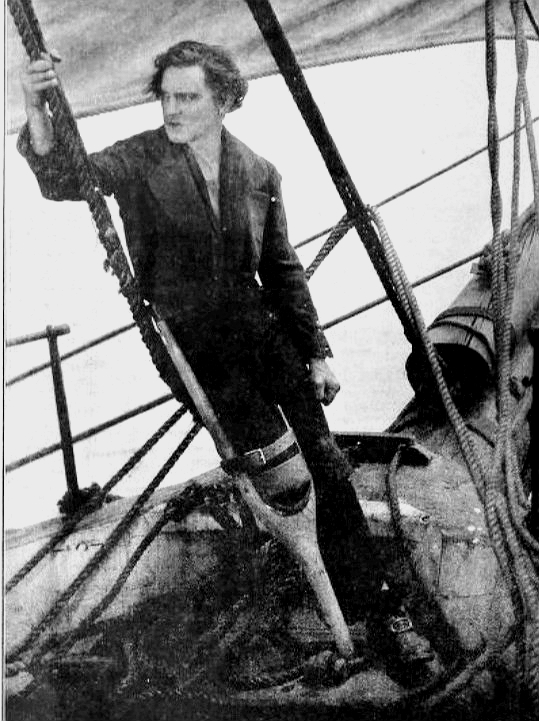
Barrymore, as Captain Ahab Ceeley in The Sea Beast (1926)

In February 1925, Barrymore staged Hamlet in London at the Haymarket Theatre, which the Manchester Guardian later said had "the most memorable first night for years". The reviews were positive, and "although none of the London critics found Barrymore superior to [Henry] Irving and [Johnston] Forbes-Robertson, many were favorable in their comparisons". Among the audience members was the 20-year-old actor John Gielgud, who wrote in his program "Barrymore is romantic in appearance and naturally gifted with grace, looks and a capacity to wear period clothes, which makes his brilliantly intellectual performance classical without being unduly severe, and he has tenderness, remoteness, and neurosis all placed with great delicacy and used with immense effectiveness and admirable judgment". Looking back in the 1970s, he said: "The handsome middle-aged stars of the Edwardian theatre romanticised the part. Even John Barrymore, whose Hamlet I admired very much, cut the play outrageously so that he could, for instance, play the closet scene all out for sentiment with the emphasis on the 'Oedipus complex' – sobbing on Gertrude's bosom. Yet Barrymore ... had a wonderful edge and a demonic sense of humour."

At the end of this run of Hamlet, Barrymore traveled to Paris, where Oelrichs had stayed during his residence in London, but the reunion was not a happy one and the couple argued frequently. When he returned to America, she remained in Paris, and the couple drew up a separation agreement that provided Oelrichs with $18,000 a year and stated that neither could sue for divorce on the grounds of adultery. While he had been in London, Warner Bros and Barrymore entered into a contact for three further films at a salary of $76,250 per picture. (Note: $76,250 in 1925 equates to a little over $1 million in 2014. He was also given a suite at the Ambassador Hotel, Los Angeles, including all meals, and a chauffeured limousine.) He later claimed that his motivation for moving from stage to films was the "lack of repetition—the continual playing of a part, which is so ruinous to an actor, is entirely eliminated".

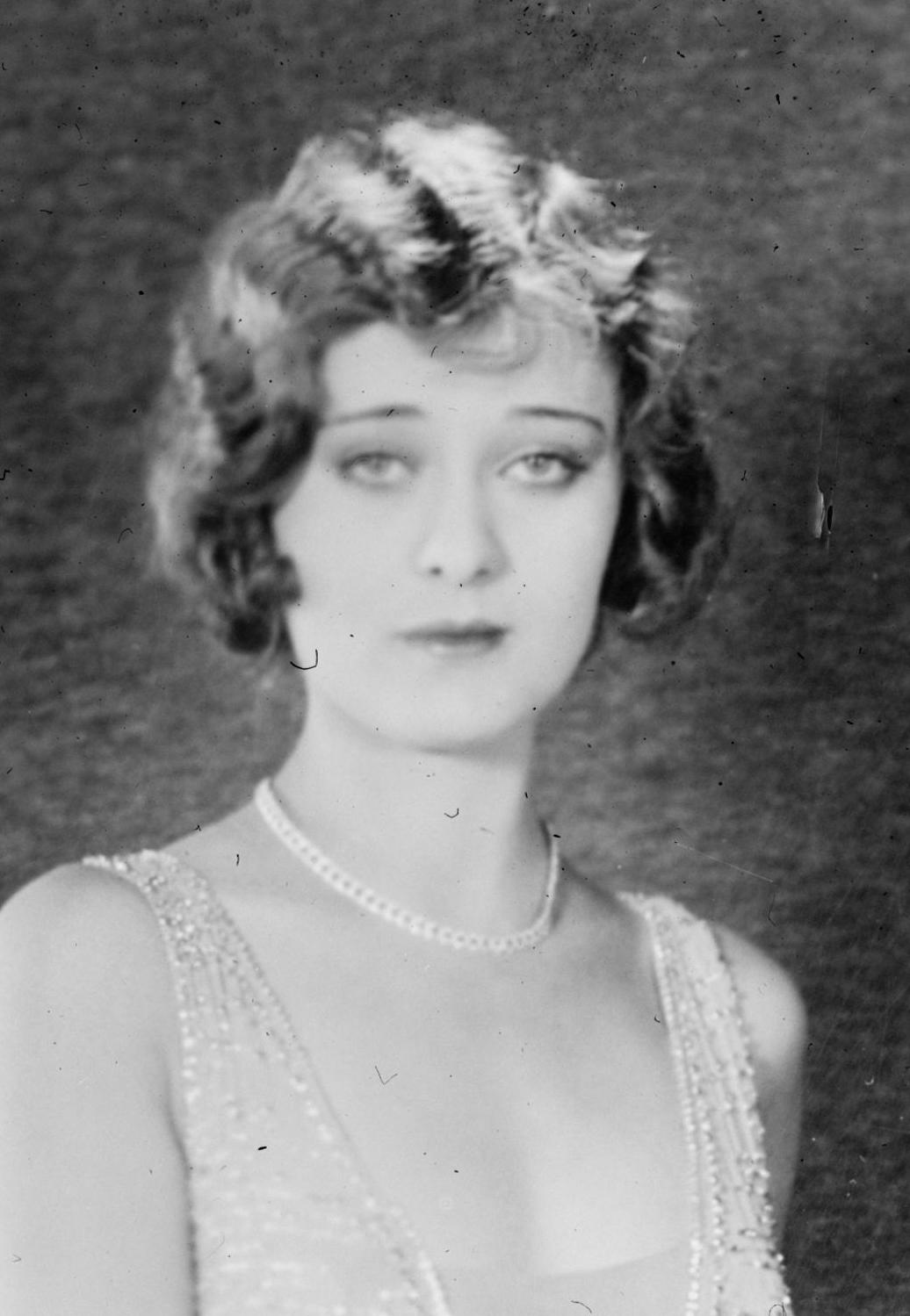
Dolores Costello in 1926; she was Barrymore's co-star in The Sea Beast and, later, his third wife.

Barrymore's first film under the contract was The Sea Beast (1926), loosely based on the 1851 novel Moby-Dick, in which he played Captain Ahab Ceeley. This was one of the biggest money-makers of the year for Warner Bros. Although Barrymore wanted Astor to play the female lead, she was unavailable, and Dolores Costello was cast in her place. He later said that "I fell in love with her instantly. This time I knew I was right", and the couple began an affair. Costello's father, the actor Maurice Costello, was angered by the relationship, but his complaints were ignored by both Costello and her mother: Costello's parents separated and were divorced as a result. The film was well received by critics, and Mordaunt Hall, the film critic of The New York Times, praised the "energy, earnestness and virility" Barrymore displayed in the role of Ceeley.

As filming finished on The Sea Beast, work began on Don Juan, the first feature-length film with synchronized Vitaphone sound effects and a musical soundtrack. Although Barrymore wanted to play opposite Costello again, Jack L. Warner, the film's producer, signed Astor. After completing his Warner Bros. contract with When a Man Loves, with Costello, Barrymore joined United Artists (UA) under a three-film deal. For the next three years, according to Morrison, he "enjoyed unprecedented prosperity and spent lavishly". (Note: The three films made with UA are The Beloved Rogue (1927), Tempest (1928) and Eternal Love (1929).) Nevertheless, he received some harsh reviews. Critic and essayist Stark Young wrote in The New Republic that Barrymore's films were "rotten, vulgar, empty, in bad taste, dishonest, noisome with a silly and unwholesome exhibitionism, and odious with a kind of stale and degenerate studio adolescence. Their appeal is cheap, cynical and specious".

In 1927, Barrymore planned to revive Hamlet at the Hollywood Bowl, but in August he canceled the production, without explanation, and began filming the third of the UA pictures, Eternal Love, for which he was paid $150,000. (Note: $150,000 in 1927 was worth a little over $2 million in 2014.) In February 1928, Barrymore obtained a quiet divorce from Oelrichs; she eagerly agreed to the separation, as she was in a relationship with a lawyer, Harrison Tweed, whom she later married. Barrymore and Costello married in November that year; their daughter, Dolores, was born in April 1930 and a son, John Drew Barrymore, followed in June 1932. Barrymore purchased and converted an estate in the Hollywood Hills into 16 different buildings with 55 rooms, gardens, skeet ranges, swimming pools, fountains and a totem pole.

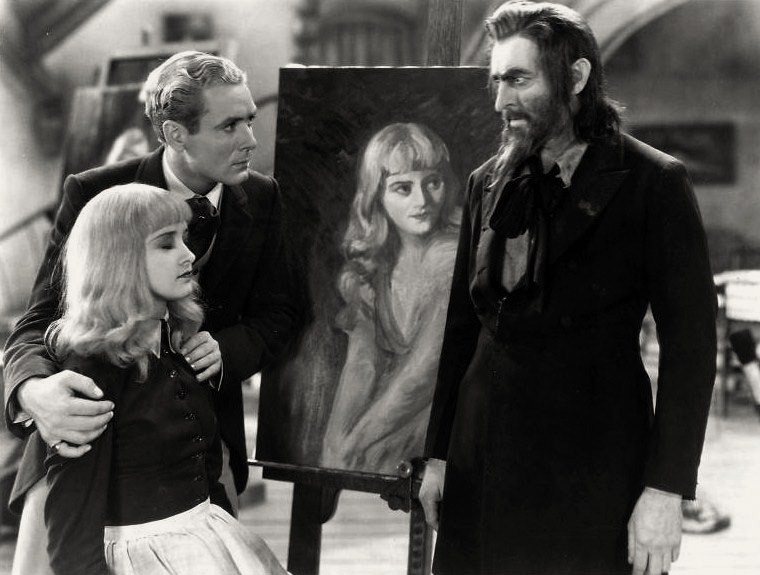
(l to r), Marian Marsh, Bramwell Fletcher and Barrymore in Svengali (1931)

By the late 1920s, sound films had become common, following the 1927 sensation, The Jazz Singer. Actors with trained voices were in demand by the studios, and Barrymore was offered a five-film deal with Warner Bros. at $150,000 per picture, and a share of the profits. Before he began this contract, he played his first speaking role on film: a one-off section in The Show of Shows (1929), playing Richard, Duke of Gloucester in Henry VI, Part 3. His first two films under contract were General Crack and The Man from Blankley's, each of which were modestly successful. (Note: The Man from Blankley's is a lost film.) As he had been frustrated at the inability of making The Sea Beast as a sound film, Barrymore returned to Moby Dick as the source for a 1930 film of the same name. Peters thinks little of the film, describing it as "a seesaw between the cosmic and the comic, a travesty of Melville as well as a silly film all on its own".

The following year, Barrymore played the title role of a manipulative voice coach in Svengali, opposite Marian Marsh. Martin Dickstein, the critic for the Brooklyn Daily Eagle, wrote that Barrymore "registers a personal triumph in the role", calling his performance "brilliant ... one of the best of his movie career". Later in 1931, he played a crippled puppeteer, who tries to fulfill his frustrated ambitions by manipulating the life of a young male ballet dancer and the dancer's lover (also Marsh) in The Mad Genius; the film was a commercial failure. With disappointing box office returns from their five-film deal, Warner Bros. decided not to offer Barrymore a contract renewal. Instead, Barrymore signed a non-exclusive contract with Metro-Goldwyn-Mayer (MGM) and took a $25,000 salary cut per film.

=== Years of transition: 1932–1936 ===
Barrymore's first film for MGM was the 1932 mystery Arsène Lupin, in which he co-starred with his brother Lionel. In The New York Times, Hall called Barrymore's performance "admirable" and wrote that "it is a pleasure to see [him] again in something in a lighter vein." The same year, Barrymore starred as jewel thief Baron Felix von Geigern together with Greta Garbo in the 1932 film Grand Hotel, in which Lionel also appeared. Critical opinion of Barrymore's acting was divided; John Gilbert's biographer Eve Golden refers to Barrymore as seeming "more like ... [Garbo's] affectionate father than her lover", while George Blaisdell of International Photographer praised the dialogue and wrote that a viewer would be "deeply impressed with the rarity in screen drama on which he is looking." Grand Hotel won the Academy Award for Best Picture and was one of the highest-grossing films of the year. It was later added to the National Film Registry.

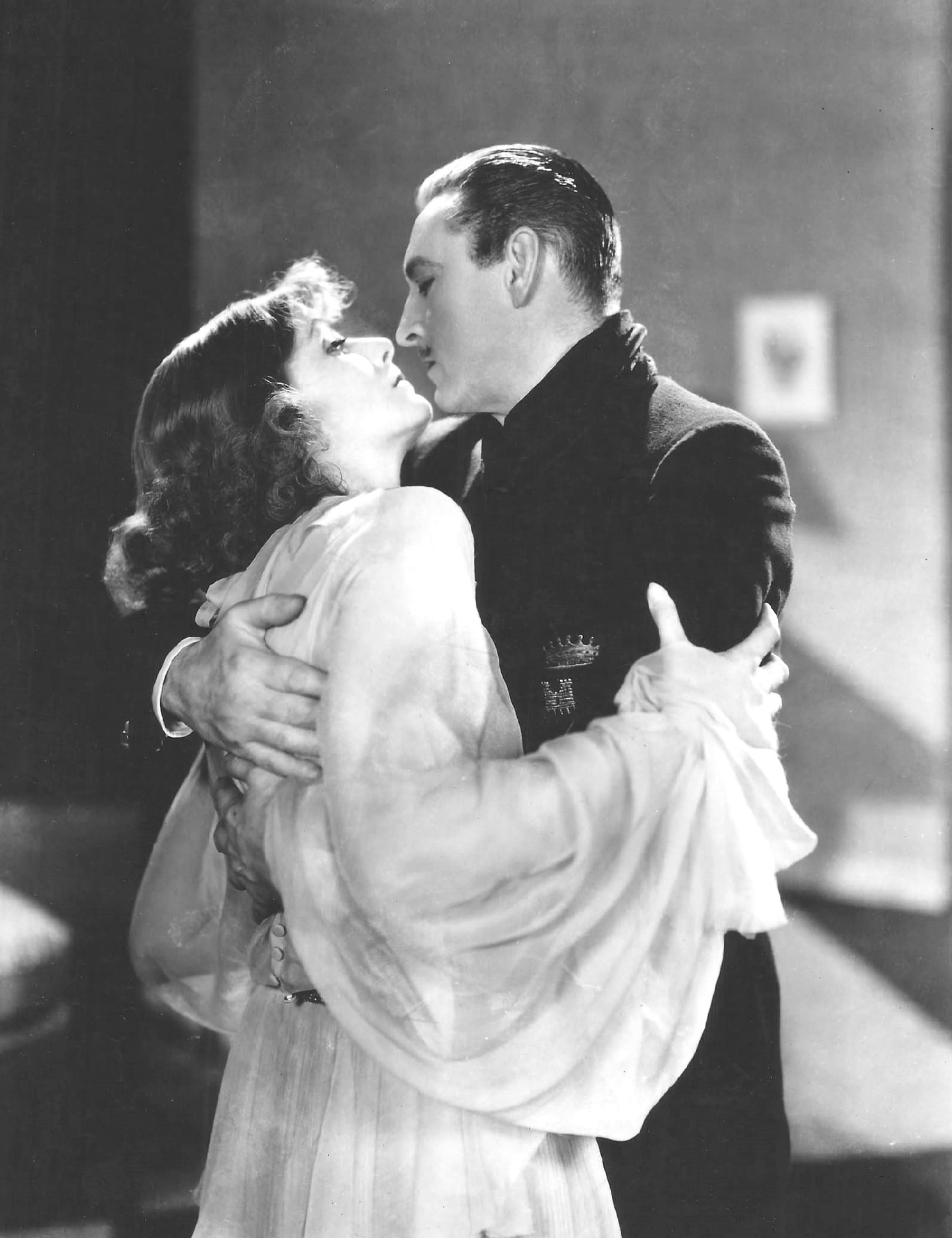
Barrymore with Greta Garbo in Grand Hotel (1932)

In 1932, Barrymore went to RKO Pictures where he played a borderline-alcoholic lawyer in State's Attorney, and an escaped lunatic in A Bill of Divorcement, opposite Katharine Hepburn in her screen debut. Film scholar Daniel Bernardi later noted the humanism demonstrated between Barrymore's character and his family, particularly the "close bond" between father and daughter. In his final film of the year, he returned to MGM for Rasputin and the Empress, Barrymore, Ethel and Lionel co-starred. Physically, Barrymore had deteriorated since filming Svengali, and he had gained weight because of his drinking. Peters notes the "dissipation of the once ascetic face, a dissipation only underlined by the studio's attempt to reconstruct with lights, filters and make-up a spiritual beauty that had been corrupted." The film was a critical and commercial failure, and MGM lost significant amounts of money. The New Yorker thought the three Barrymores had produced their worst work.

The year 1933 was a busy one for Barrymore, and his decline began to be evident. He appeared in five films during the year, including as a meek schoolteacher-turned-businessman in Topaze, opposite Myrna Loy, and Dinner at Eight, with Lionel. Peters opines that Barrymore's portrayal of a washed-up alcoholic actor "could well have fixed ... in the public's and MGM's mind that John Barrymore was a drunken has-been." After the run of films with MGM, the company ended its contact with Barrymore amid its financial woes caused by the Great Depression. He then signed with Universal Studios to portray a troubled Jewish lawyer in Counsellor at Law. During filming he struggled to remember his lines for even small scenes. Filming was stopped on one occasion after more than 25 takes when he struggled to recall the right lines; it was a problem with which he began to suffer regularly. Despite the problems, Norden believes that this was "one of his best film performances". (Note: Barrymore's five films of 1933 were Topaze, Reunion in Vienna, Dinner at Eight, Night Flight and Counsellor at Law.)

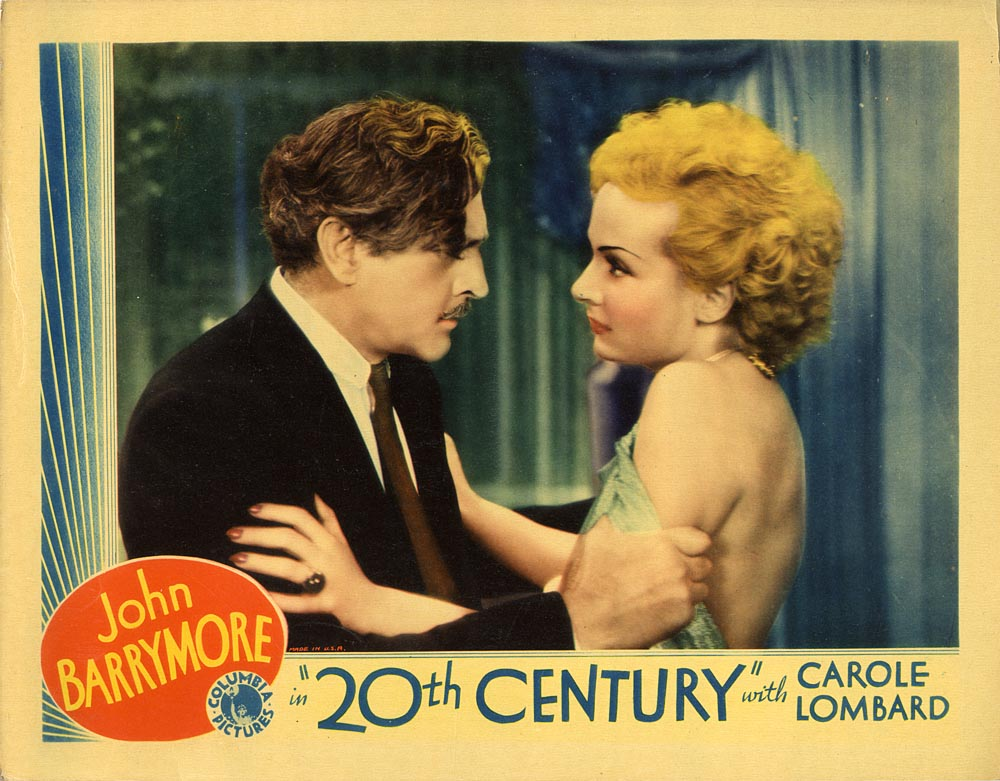
Barrymore with Carole Lombard on a lobby card for Twentieth Century (1934)

In December 1933, Barrymore agreed with RKO to film Hamlet. He underwent screen tests and hired Carrington to act as vocal coach again, but during one session, his memory failed him again, and the project was eventually scrapped. Barrymore starred in two films released in 1934, the drama Long Lost Father and the screwball comedy Twentieth Century. In the latter film, Barrymore played madcap Broadway impresario Oscar Jaffe, a role in which he demonstrated a "rare genius as a comedian". Morrison writes that the portrayal was one "that many consider to be his finest contribution to film". In 2011, the picture was added to the National Film Registry, where it was described as Barrymore's "last great film role".

In May 1934, Barrymore was filming Hat, Coat and Glove for RKO when, during the filming of one scene, he again forgot his lines and even the name of his character. Filming was postponed until the following day, but the result was the same. After he took a break for a few days, he returned to the set, but he still could not remember any of the script, and RKO replaced him with Ricardo Cortez. Soon afterwards, he suffered a mental and physical breakdown and was hospitalized. Costello confirmed that his drinking over the previous two years had worsened, and she described him as a "hopeless alcoholic". Barrymore's relationship with Costello was deeply troubled and, believing she was going to declare him mentally incompetent, he left their home in Los Angeles and traveled first to London and then to India. He returned to the U.S. in early 1935 and settled in New York, leaving his wife in Los Angeles. Shortly after his return, he was hospitalized for a month with bronchitis and influenza. A 19-year-old fan, Elaine Jacobs, visited him, and the two became good friends. On his release from the hospital, her mother invited him to recuperate at their house. She changed her name to Elaine Barrie, which she explained was to get "as near to Barrymore as I dared", and they began a relationship. In May, the couple underwent the first of several professional collaborations, when they appeared on Rudy Vallée's The Fleischmann's Yeast Hour radio show. Costello filed for a divorce from Barrymore on May 25, 1935, citing mental cruelty, habitual intemperance, and desertion.

The new relationship was widely reported in the tabloid press, who labeled the couple Caliban and Ariel. After a series of arguments with Barrie, Barrymore considered the relationship with Barrie to be at an end, and he left for Los Angeles. A newspaper editor chartered a plane and flew Barrie to Chicago, to meet Barrymore's train; she broadcast a plea for him to return, and her pursuit became national news. Costello's divorce from Barrymore became final in October 1935. Morrison thinks that the headlines established a new reputation for Barrymore of "the aging satyr, the has-been alcoholic, the much-married ham". This was a blow to his self-respect, but he faced his troubles "with aplomb and a sense of humor", according to Morrison. To escape from the spotlight, Barrymore took vacations on his yacht, Infanta; it cost him over $35,000 a year to run, and so he sold it in 1938 after encountering financial difficulties.

=== Decline and death: 1936–1942 ===
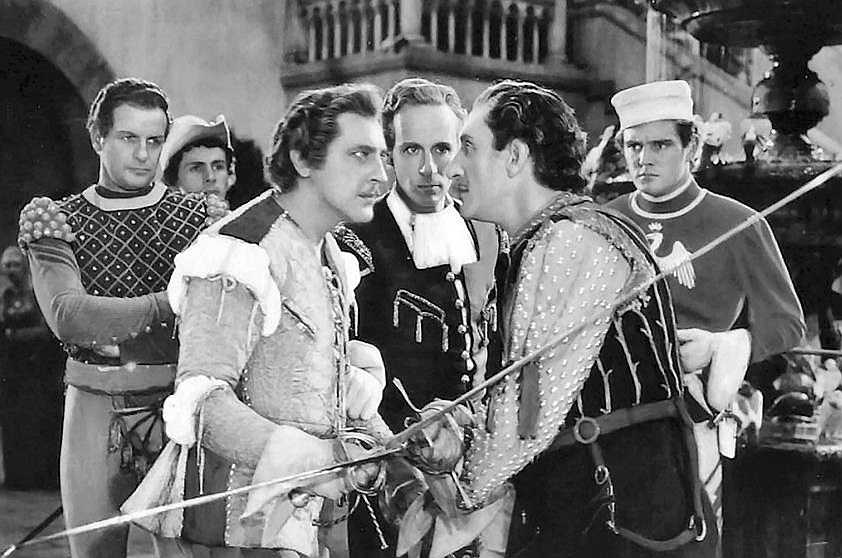
Barrymore, as Mercutio in Romeo and Juliet (1936). The three central figures are (l to r) Barrymore, Leslie Howard and Basil Rathbone.

Barrymore's alcohol dependence meant most studios were unwilling to employ him, but MGM risked casting him in the role of Mercutio in their 1936 film Romeo and Juliet. To minimize disruption to the schedule, the studio put Barrymore in Kelley's Rest Home, a sanatorium for alcoholics, but he continued to drink covertly and was disruptive on set. Basil Rathbone, who was playing Tybalt, later recounted that "he was drinking and unreliable on the set ... It was sad to see him in such a state." Opinions on his portrayal were divided. Some critics, such as Welford Beaton of the Hollywood Spectator, thought "Barrymore is an acting gem", although Gielgud was uncomplimentary, writing to Peggy Ashcroft that "Barrymore, who is like a monstrous old male impersonator jumping through a hoop, should really have been shot."

Word about Barrymore's problems on and off the set spread around the industry, and he did not work on another film for over a year until he had a supporting role in the musical film Maytime. His divorce from Costello was finalized in October 1936, and he married Barrie in November the same year. The couple had a heated argument in public shortly afterward, and he again spent time in Kelley's Rest Home and hospital, which cost him an average of $800 daily, draining his finances. When he came out, he collapsed on the Maytime set. On January 15, 1937, he was served with divorce papers, and a month later he filed for bankruptcy protection, with debts of $160,000. (Note: $160,000 in 1937 is equal to a little more than $9 million in 2014.) The divorce was granted in April, but the couple reconciled before it was finalized.

Barrymore decided to work on more Shakespeare roles. In June 1937, he signed with NBC Radio to produce a series of six episodes under the name Streamlined Shakespeare, which also featured Barrie. The first program was Hamlet, which was well received by critics. The New York Times commented that "Shakespeare's lines uttered dramatically by the voice of John Barrymore sweep through the 'ether' with a sound of finality; it seems that they are his words and no one else could speak them with such lifelike force". Peters disagrees however, and considers that "because he was desperate he pressed too hard and ended by caricaturing, not capturing, his great Shakespearean acting". (Note: The plays and roles undertaken in the Streamlined Shakespeare series were: Hamlet (as Hamlet), Richard III (as Richard, Duke of Gloucester), Macbeth (as Macbeth), The Tempest (as Prospero and Caliban), Twelfth Night (as Sir Toby Belch and Malvolio) and The Taming of the Shrew (as Petruchio).)

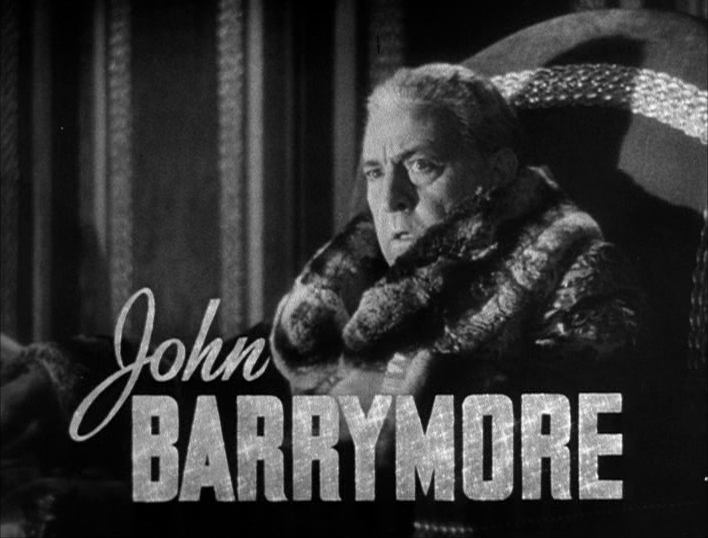
Barrymore in Marie Antoinette (1938): during filming he used cue cards as a memory aid.

Throughout the NBC series, Barrymore had been reliable, sober, and responsible, and the studios reacted positively with offers of work. This led to appearances in nine films in 1937 and 1938, including as Colonel Nielson in three Bulldog Drummond films, and roles in True Confession and Marie Antoinette. (Note: The films Barrymore appeared in over the next two years were Bulldog Drummond Comes Back, Night Club Scandal, Bulldog Drummond's Revenge, True Confession (all 1937), Bulldog Drummond's Peril, Romance in the Dark, Marie Antoinette, Spawn of the North and Hold That Co-ed (all 1938).) He was offered predominantly supporting roles, but he worked conscientiously on the films and as a result was able to honor his debts. His memory was still problematic, and he used cue cards as an aid; his fellow actors and the directors of the films were sympathetic to his condition. When he filmed his last serious role, Gregory Vance in the 1939 film The Great Man Votes, the director, Garson Kanin, ensured that the cast and crew addressed him as "Mr. Barrymore" as a mark of respect.

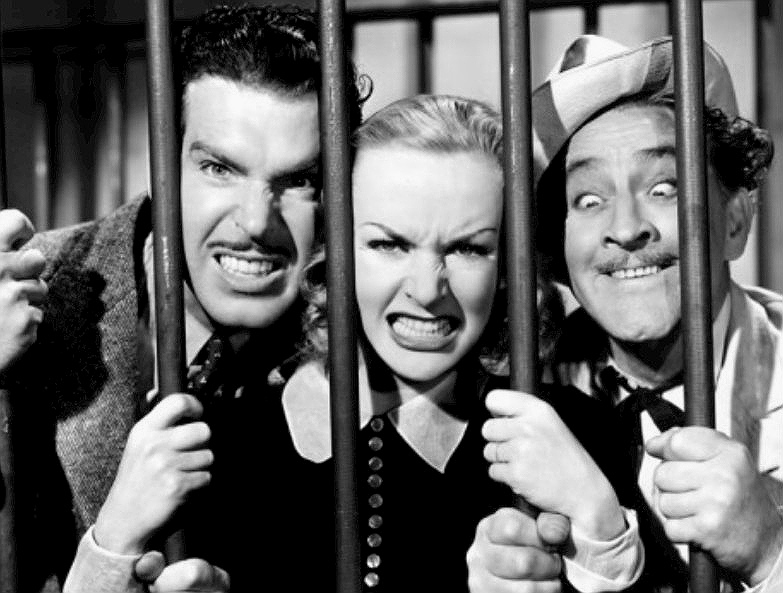
(l to r), Fred MacMurray, Carole Lombard and Barrymore in True Confession (1937)

Barrymore and his wife both appeared in supporting roles in the 1939 screwball comedy Midnight, her only film role. The New York Times thought the film was "one of the liveliest, gayest, wittiest and naughtiest comedies of a long hard season" and that Barrymore, "the [Lou] Gehrig of eye-brow batting, rolls his phrases with his usual richly humorous effect". The film was inducted into the National Film Registry in 2013. Barrymore and his wife appeared together in the stage farce My Dear Children, which opened in March 1939 at Princeton University's McCarter Theatre. He played the lead role, Allan Manville, an ageing hammy Shakespearean has-been.

Because of his failing memory, Barrymore ad-libbed constantly throughout the show. In some points the new additions were an improvement, but he also greeted friends in the audience, and used profanities freely. Nevertheless, the show was a success. Life magazine wrote that "People flock to see [Barrymore], not for polished performance, but because he converts the theater into a rowdy histrionic madhouse. Sometimes he arrives late. Sometimes he is tight [drunk]. Usually he forgets his lines. But he always puts on a great show." When the show reached Broadway, Life wrote that "Barrymore's return to Times Square was a huge professional triumph". Brooks Atkinson, writing for The New York Times thought Barrymore was "still the most gifted actor in this country. ... Although he has recklessly played the fool for a number of years, he is nobody's fool in My Dear Children but a superbly gifted actor on a tired holiday." Barrymore and his wife continued to argue during the play's run, and she left the play part way through the tour. They attempted a reconciliation when the production reached New York, but the couple divorced in late 1940.

In 1940, Barrymore appeared in The Great Profile, a spoof of his life in the months prior to My Dear Children. Barrymore played Evans Garrick, closely modeled on his own experience, and Mary Beth Hughes played his wife. The critics reacted harshly to the film, and to Barrymore's association with it. The New York Times wrote that "As a play it is a feeble thing, hardly matching the spectacular public accounts of his amours ... for all of Mr. Barrymore's shenanigans and devastating wit, The Great Profile is more than a little pathetic. In the Winter of his Discontent Mr. Barrymore is selling his talent at cut-rate". Worse was to come in his final film, Playmates (1941), which "amply illustrated the depths to which he had fallen; he played an alcoholic Shakespearean ham named John Barrymore".

In October 1940, Barrymore returned to the NBC Radio network to work on Rudy Vallée's show, now called the Sealtest Show. Barrymore recorded 74 episodes of the program, continuing in the vein of self-parody, with jokes about his drinking, declining career, and marital issues. On May 19, 1942, while recording a line from Romeo and Juliet for the show, Barrymore collapsed. He was taken to Hollywood Presbyterian Hospital and died there on May 29, from cirrhosis of the liver and kidney failure, complicated by pneumonia. Shortly before his death, Barrymore returned to his childhood Catholic faith.

Errol Flynn claims in his memoir that as a prank film director Raoul Walsh "borrowed" Barrymore's body before burial to leave it propped in a chair at a poker table, for a drunken Flynn to discover when he returned home. Gene Fowler, a close friend of Barrymore, denied Flynn's story, saying he had stayed with the body all night. However, in a 2020 interview for the YouTube series Hot Ones, John's granddaughter Drew Barrymore confirmed Flynn's account. Barrymore was buried at Calvary Cemetery in Los Angeles on June 2. In 1980, Barrymore's son had his father's body disinterred, cremated, and reinterred in the family plot in Philadelphia's Mount Vernon Cemetery.

== Legacy ==
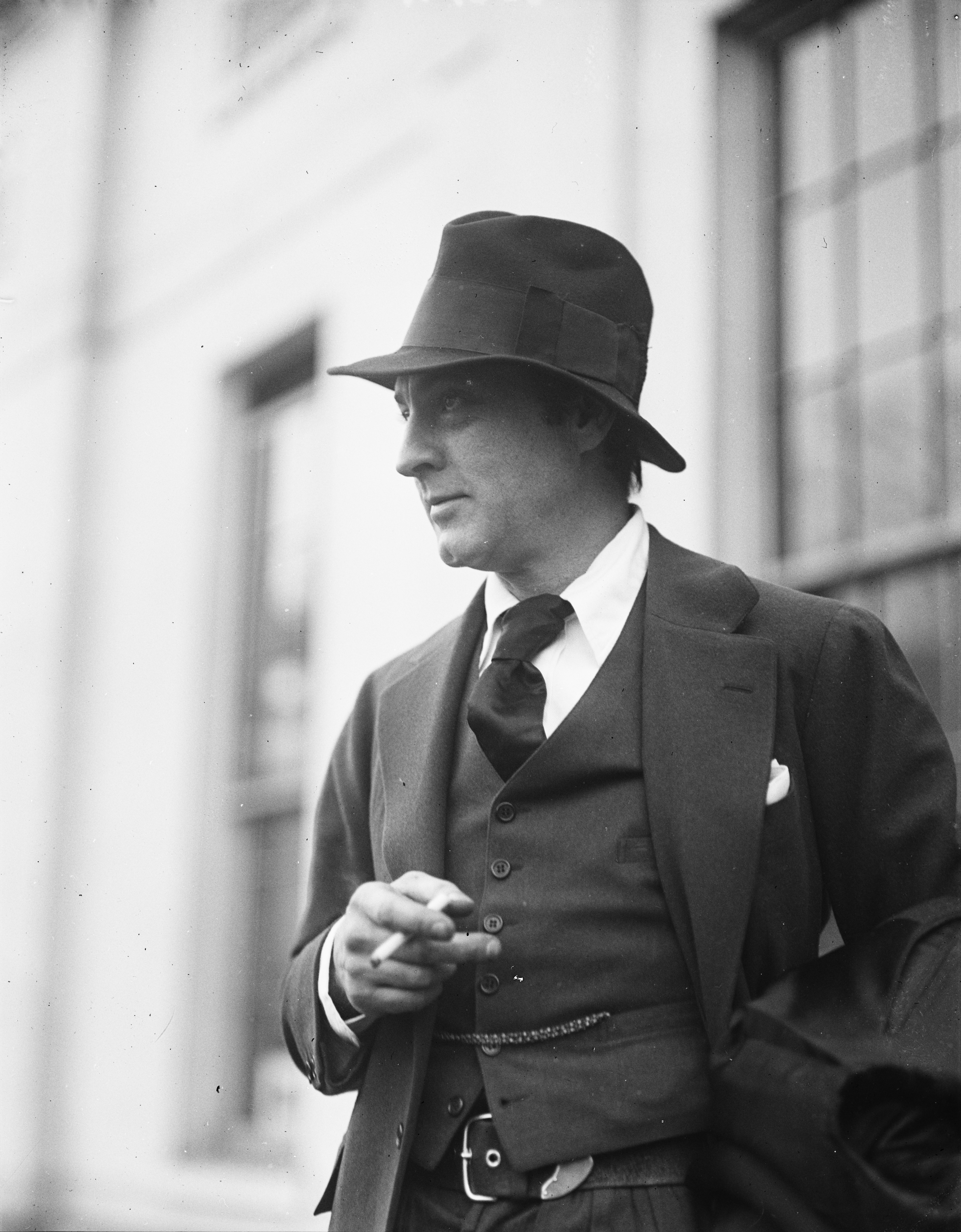
Barrymore at the White House in January 1924, after meeting President Calvin Coolidge

The New York Times obituary stated that during the period when Barrymore performed in Justice, Richard III and Hamlet, the actor "was accepted by most critics as the foremost English-speaking actor of his time ... equipped both by nature and by art." The Washington Post agreed, noting that during his stage triumphs and early years in film, "he was the great profile, the darling of the 'royal family' of the stage." Many of the obituaries made the point that Barrymore fell short of his potential. The Manchester Guardian thought that he "might with some self-discipline have added his name to the list of truly great actors ... yet he dissipated his energies". The New York Times noted that he could twist his abilities "to parody, burlesque himself and play the clown", and they considered that it was "unfortunate that the public in recent years saw him in ... [that] mood. It was a mood of careless abdication". The Washington Post observed that "with the passing of the years – and as his private life became more public – he became, despite his genius in the theater, a tabloid character."

According to Morrison, Barrymore's stage portrayals of Richard III and Hamlet were a model for modern performances of these roles. His interpretation along psychological lines was innovative, and his "dynamic portrayals ... changed the direction of subsequent revivals." Barrymore's natural acting style reversed the stage conventions of the time; his " 'colloquial' verse speaking introduced to the stage the vocal manner of a postwar gentleman."

Barrymore, drawn by John Singer Sargent, 1923

Barrymore, while alive, was honored on few occasions by the entertainment industry and its members. Although both his brother and sister won Academy Awards, the only award Barrymore ever received for his screen work was from Rudolph Valentino in 1925 for Beau Brummel. Valentino created an award in his own name and felt that his fellow actors should receive accolades for their screen work. When Barrymore attended his ceremony at Grauman's Chinese Theatre in 1940, he left more than the customary hand and footprints in the theater's forecourt: aided by the owner, Sid Grauman, Barrymore left a cement imprint of his facial profile. In February 1960, for his contribution to the motion picture industry, Barrymore was inducted into the Hollywood Walk of Fame with a star at 6667 Hollywood Boulevard; Barrymore, along with his two siblings, is included in the American Theater Hall of Fame. The Barrymore "Royal Family" of actors continued through two of his children – his son with Costello, John Drew Barrymore and his daughter with Oelrichs, Diana – both of whom became actors, as did John Jr.'s daughter Drew. Barrymore's brother Lionel died on November 15, 1954, and their sister Ethel died on June 18, 1959.

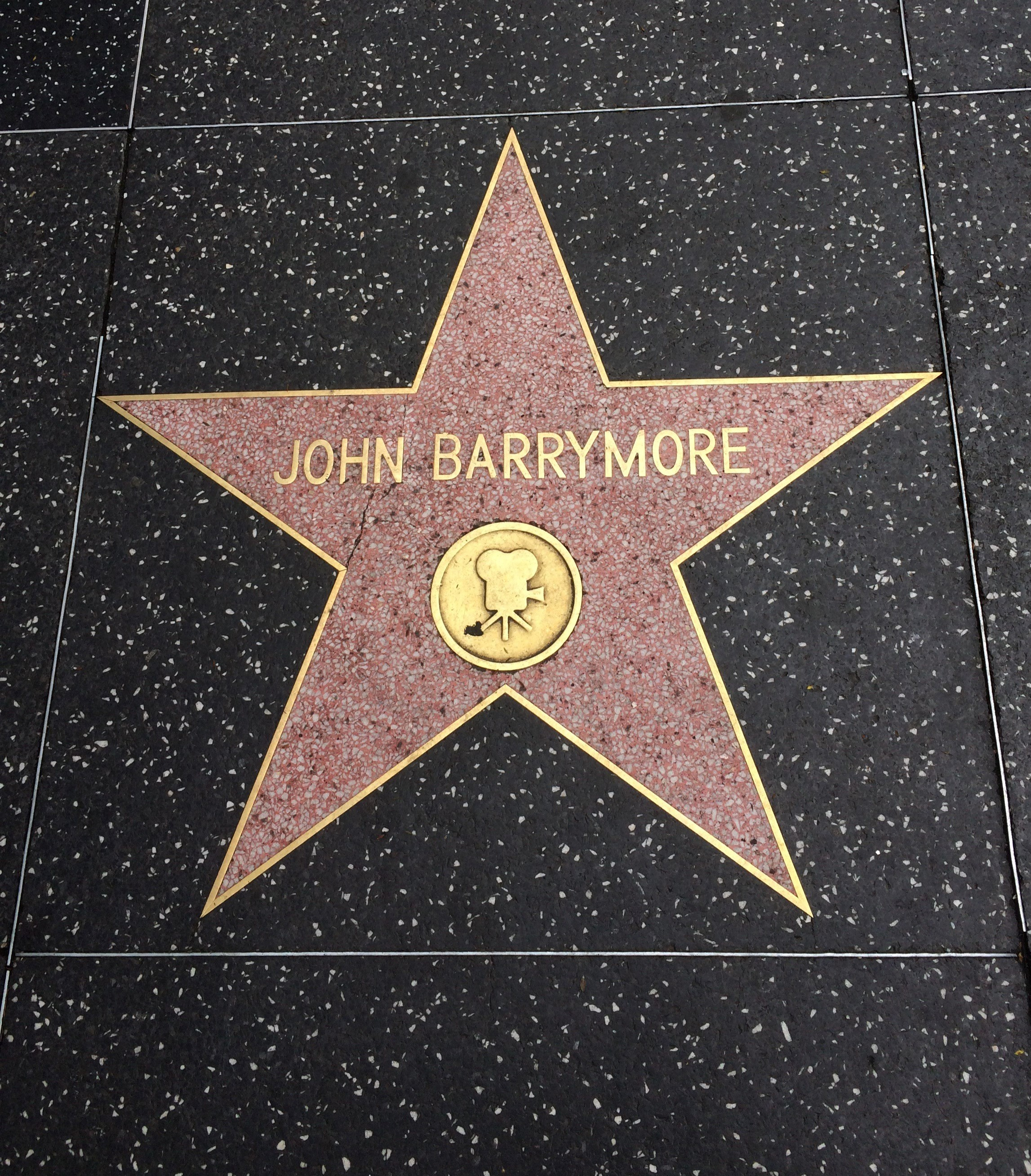
Barrymore's star on the Hollywood Walk of Fame

Barrymore's achievements and his colorful life have ensured that several biographical studies followed his 1926 autobiography, Confessions of an Actor. Alma Power-Waters produced a 1941 study, authorized by the subject, John Barrymore: The Legend and the Man; Fowler, wrote Good Night, Sweet Prince: The Life and Times of John Barrymore (1943); Alpert published The Barrymores (1964); and John Kobler wrote Damned in Paradise: The Life of John Barrymore (1977), although Norden noted in 2000 that many of these earlier works are less than reliable. Those he identified as being more thoroughly researched are Peters' 1990 history, The House of Barrymore, and his own study of the actor's work in John Barrymore: A Bio-Bibliography (1995). Subsequent to Norden's comments on the available literature, Morrison published the positively reviewed John Barrymore, Shakespearean Actor in 1997, which focuses on Barrymore's stage work.

There were several celebratory events in 1982, on the centenary of Barrymore's birth. The Academy of Motion Picture Arts and Sciences and the Museum of Modern Art jointly hosted a commemorative program of his work, which included numerous excerpts from his films and interviews with some who knew him, including Barrie and his one-time co-star Myrna Loy. The same year, in celebration of the centenary of the Actors Fund of America, the US Postal Service issued a postage stamp featuring Barrymore and his siblings. In February 2010, an intersection in Fort Lee, New Jersey, was renamed John Barrymore Way on what would have been the actor's 128th birthday. The intersection marked the spot of the former Buckheister's Hotel, where Barrymore had his 1900 stage debut in "A Man of the World".

== Portrayals and characterizations ==
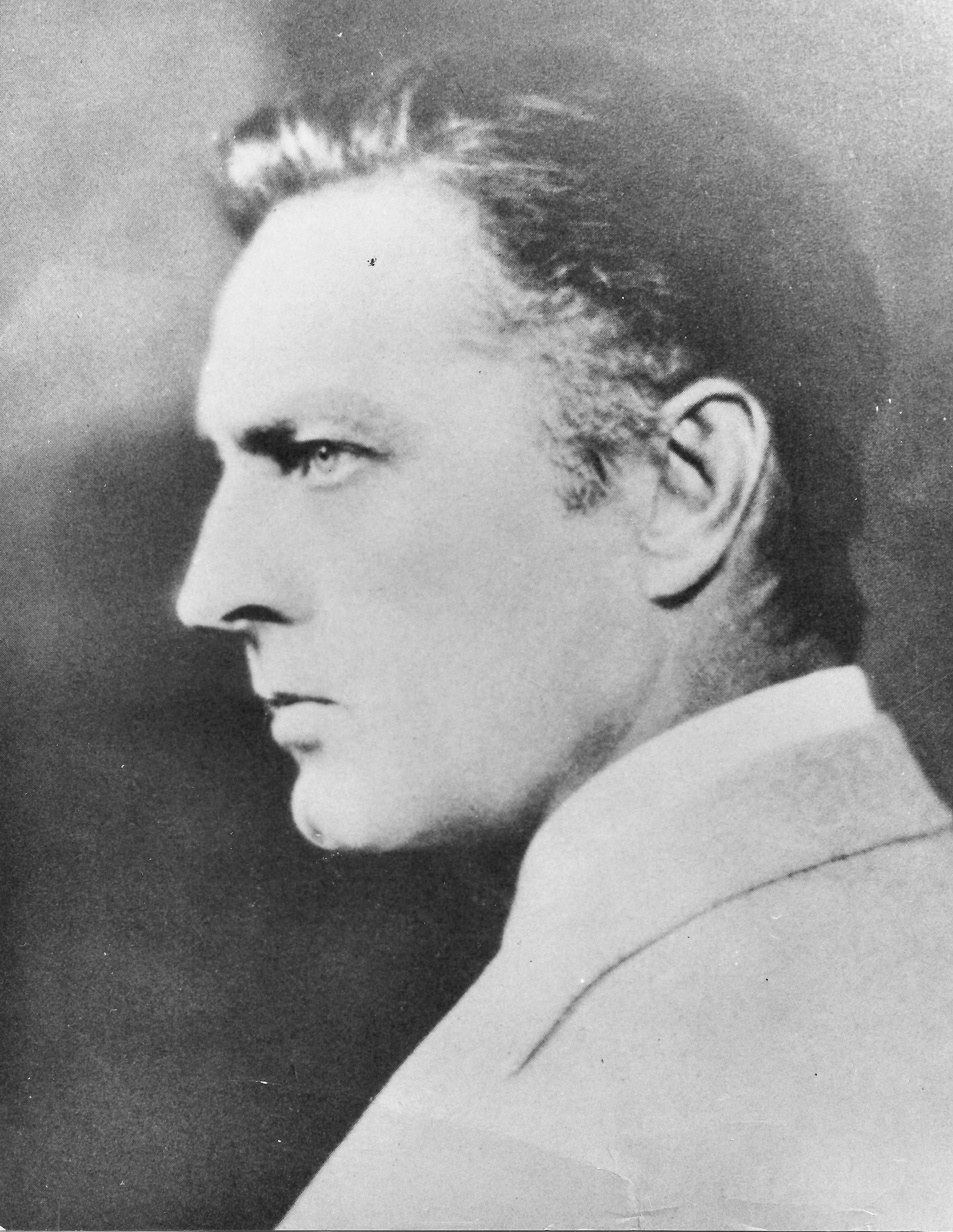
"The Great Profile", photographed in 1927

Barrymore has been used as the inspiration for characters on stage and film. He performed as himself in a number of works (including The Great Profile, My Dear Children and Playmates), and in the Ziegfeld Follies of 1921 he was played by his friend W. C. Fields. In 1927 the Barrymore family was parodied in The Royal Family in which a character based on him was portrayed by Fredric March, whose performance Barrymore admired. The play was staged in London in 1934 as Theatre Royal, with Laurence Olivier in the Barrymore role, and adapted as a film in 1930, with March reprising his performance.

In 1991, Paul Rudnick's comedy I Hate Hamlet, performed at the Walter Kerr Theatre, was set in Barrymore's former apartment. He returns after a séance, dressed in his Hamlet costume. Nicol Williamson played the Barrymore role. Three years later, a London production, Jack: A Night on the Town with John Barrymore, ran for 60 performances at the Criterion Theatre, and Williamson again played the lead. Barrymore, a two-person play by William Luce, premiered in 1996 and depicts Barrymore shortly before his death in 1942 as he is rehearsing a revival of his Richard III. Christopher Plummer played the title role. A film version was released in 2011, with Plummer again taking the main role.

Barrymore had been a friend and drinking companion of Fields. In the 1976 film W.C. Fields and Me, Barrymore was played by Jack Cassidy. Barrymore's friend, Errol Flynn, played him in a 1958 film Too Much, Too Soon, an adaptation of the autobiography of Diana Barrymore, with Dorothy Malone playing the female lead. Howard Thompson, the film critic of The New York Times, wrote that "Flynn, as the late John Barrymore, a moody, wild-drinking ruin of a great actor, steals the picture, lock, stock and keg. It is only in the scenes of his savage disintegration, as the horrified girl hangs on, that the picture approaches real tragedy."

== Notes and references ==
=== Sources ===
- Alpert, Hollis (1965). The Barrymores. London: W.H. Allen. OCLC 30274937.
- Barrymore, John (1971) [1926]. Confessions of an Actor. New York, NY: B Blom. OCLC 892036158.
- Bernardi, Daniel (2012). Hollywood's Chosen People: The Jewish Experience in American Cinema. Detroit, MI: Wayne State University Press. ISBN 978-0-8143-3807-0. Archived from the original on May 6, 2016.
- Byers, Paula K., ed. (1998). "The Barrymores". Encyclopedia of World Biography. Detroit, MI: Gale Research. ISBN 978-0-7876-2541-2.
- Croall, Jonathan (2000). Gielgud – A Theatrical Life, 1904–2000. London: Methuen. ISBN 978-0-413-74560-6.
- Davies, David Stuart (2001). Starring Sherlock Holmes. London: Titan Books. ISBN 978-1-84023-250-9.
- Donnelley, Paul (2003). Fade to Black: A Book of Movie Obituaries. London: Omnibus. ISBN 978-0-7119-9512-3. Archived from the original on May 20, 2016.
- Farwell, Byron (2000). Over There: The United States in the Great War, 1917–1918. New York, NY: Norton. ISBN 978-0-393-32028-2.
- Flynn, Errol (2002). My Wicked, Wicked Ways: The Autobiography of Errol Flynn. New York, NY: Rowman & Littlefield. ISBN 978-0-8154-1250-2. Archived from the original on April 28, 2016.
- Fowler, Gene (1944). Good Night, Sweet Prince. New York, NY: Viking Press. OCLC 551284939.
- Gielgud, John (1979). An Actor and His Time. London: Sidgwick and Jackson. ISBN 978-0-283-98573-7.
- Gielgud, John (2004). Mangan, Richard (ed.). Gielgud's Letters. London: Weidenfeld and Nicolson. ISBN 978-0-297-82989-8.
- Golden, Eve (2013). John Gilbert: The Last of the Silent Film Stars. Lexington, KY: University Press of Kentucky. ISBN 978-0-8131-4163-3. Archived from the original on October 20, 2021.
- Kobler, John (1977). Damned in Paradise: The Life of John Barrymore. New York, NY: Atheneum. ISBN 978-0-689-10814-3.
- Kotsilibas-Davis, James (2000). "Barrymore, Maurice". American National Biography. Oxford University Press. Archived from the original on May 31, 2020.(subscription required)
- McArthur, Benjamin (2000). "Barrymore, Ethel". American National Biography. Oxford University Press. Archived from the original on March 4, 2016.(subscription required)
- McCaffrey, Donald W.; Jacobs, Christopher P. (1999). Guide to the Silent Years of American Cinema. Westport, CT: Greenwood Publishing Group. ISBN 978-0-313-30345-6. "Guide to the Silent Years of American Cinema."
- Mank, Gregory William (1994). Hollywood Cauldron: Thirteen Horror Films from the Genre's Golden Age. Jefferson, NC: McFarland & Company. ISBN 978-0-7864-6255-1. Archived from the original on May 11, 2016.
- Mank, Gregory William (2007). Hollywood's Hellfire Club: The Misadventures of John Barrymore, W.C. Fields, Errol Flynn and the "Bundy Drive" Boys. Port Townsend, WA: Feral House. ISBN 978-1-932595-24-6. Archived from the original on July 23, 2016.
- Mank, Gregory William (2014). The Very Witching Time of Night: Dark Alleys of Classic Horror Cinema. Jefferson, NC: McFarland & Company. ISBN 978-0-7864-4955-2. Archived from the original on May 10, 2016.
- Morrison, Michael A. (1997). John Barrymore, Shakespearean Actor. Cambridge: Cambridge University Press. ISBN 978-0-521-62028-4.
- Norden, Martin F. (1995). John Barrymore: A Bio-Bibliography. Westport, CT: Greenwood Publishing Group. ISBN 978-0-313-29268-2.
- Norden, Martin F. (2000a). "Barrymore, John". American National Biography. Oxford University Press. Archived from the original on May 31, 2020.(subscription required)
- Peters, Margot (1990). The House of Barrymore. New York, NY: Touchstone. ISBN 978-0-671-74799-2.
- Power-Waters, Alma (1942). John Barrymore, The Authorized Life. London: Stanley Paul & Co. OCLC 8154948.
- Stephens, E. J.; Wanamaker, Marc (2010). Early Warner Bros. Studios. Charleston, SC: Arcadia Publishing. ISBN 978-0-7385-8091-3. Archived from the original on June 4, 2016.
- Stephenson, William (2000). "Barrymore, Lionel". American National Biography. Oxford University Press. Archived from the original on May 31, 2020.(subscription required)
- Stork, Mike (2007). Foss Maritime Company. Mount Pleasant, SC: Arcadia Publishing. ISBN 978-0-7385-4881-4. Archived from the original on October 20, 2021.
- Tibbetts, John C.; Welsh, James M. (2010). American Classic Screen Features. Plymouth: Scarecrow Press. ISBN 978-0-8108-7679-8. Archived from the original on June 3, 2016.
- Werner, Alex (2014). Sherlock Holmes: The Man Who Never Lived and Will Never Die. London: Ebury Press. ISBN 978-0-09-195872-5.
- Williams, Joe (2012). Hollywood Myths: The Shocking Truths Behind Film's Most Incredible Secrets and Scandals. London: Voyageur Press. ISBN 978-0-7603-4241-1. Archived from the original on June 10, 2016.
