= Beatrice Prentice =

American actress

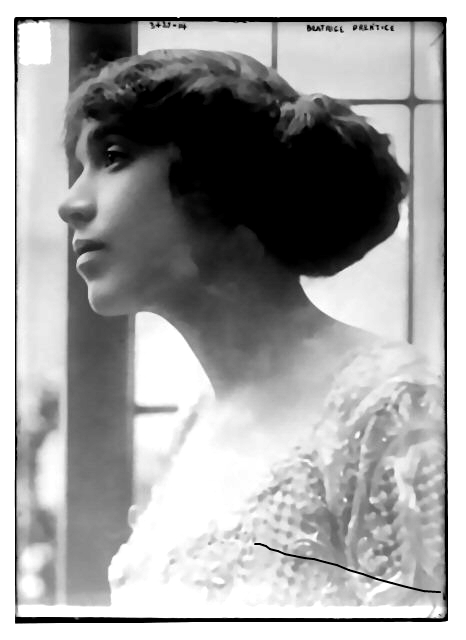
- Library of Congress c. 1910–1915
- Born: September 1, 1884; Mount Vernon, New York, U.S.
- Died: May 30, 1977 (aged 92); Los Angeles, California, U.S.
- Occupation: Actress
- Years active: 1907–1927
- Spouse: Harrison Ford (m. 1909; died 1957)

Beatrice Prentice (September 1, 1884 – May 30, 1977) was an American stage actress of the early 20th century.

== Family ==
Per the baptismal records of Mount Vernon Trinity Church (Episcopal), New York, Prentice was born in Mount Vernon, the daughter of Fannie (Mills) and Daniel Prentice, but had ties to a prominent New York City family whose members were listed in the "blue book" social register. The other Prentices objected when she entered the acting profession. She married the silent film actor Harrison Ford on March 29, 1909. Because of her family's objection to her marriage, the union was not discovered by newspapers until late August 1910. Prentice was independently wealthy; she owned a lily farm in Bermuda. She met Ford when both were in the Soldiers of Fortune company.

She had a brother, Edward H. Prentice, and a sister, Helen Prentice Frost. Edward Prentice was vice president and treasurer of the insurance firm of Fox & Pier, Inc. He died following a long illness in San Marino, California, on April 27, 1944, at the age of 67. His funeral was held at the Church of the Incarnation in New York City.

== Broadway actress ==
Prentice performed in support of Dustin Farnum in The Rangers, an American play produced by Charles Frohman and written by Augustus Thomas. Mary Boland was the leading lady. The production was presented at Wallack's Theatre on Fireman's Night at Luna Park, July 15, 1908, Prentice acted with Robert Edeson in The Call of the North. Proceeds from the entertainment benefited the Fireman's Memorial Fund. As Julie Bagneau, Prentice plays a young Indian girl whose father has been sent to his death. The Hudson Theatre audience on Broadway applauded enthusiastically to her skill in depicting her character. The show changed venues, moving to the Montauk Theatre in Brooklyn, New York, in December. The Call of the North was written by George Broadhurst. Charles Darnton, dramatic editor of the New York World, commented, Miss Prentice is all naturalness.

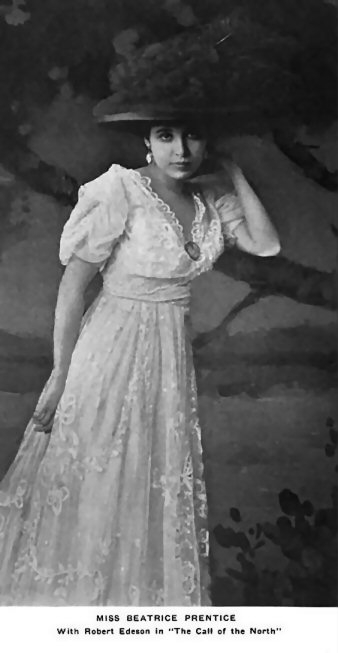
Actress Beatrice Prentice The Call of the North c. 1908

In October 1910 Prentice was in the debut of Ambition with Elsie Ferguson, in New Haven, Connecticut. The drama dealt with the theory that a woman's place was in the home, despite the temptations of a career. The play moved to the Bijou Theatre in early December.

Maggie Pepper, written by Charles Klein, began rehearsals in January 1911. Produced by Henry B. Harris, the play starred Rose Stahl, with Prentice, as Zaza, among the supporting actors. Performances began at the Harris Theatre, formerly the Hackett Theatre. The interior had been entirely done over, with a new facade accompanying the widening of 42nd Street (Manhattan). The foyer of the refurbished venue had a bronze bust of William Harris, father of Henry B. Harris(who perished in the Titanic sinking), to whom the theatre was dedicated. Maggie Pepper dealt with department store life.

The Hartfords, a three-act drama by Rachel Crothers, featured Viola Allen with Prentice in the part of her daughter. A January 1912 Lyceum Theatre (New York) audience was moved by a scene between the two women, in which Allen realizes her error in placing art before parental obligation. R.A. Roberts put on The Passing of the Idle Rich in 1913. Taken from a book by Frederick Townsend Martin, with a screenplay by Margaret Townsend, the theatrical presentation debuted at the Garden Theatre on April 28. Prentice was in the cast together with Beverley Sitgreaves, Marie Burke, Victoria Montgomery, and Escamillo Fernandez.

The Candler Theatre presented Making Dick Over, a comedy in three-acts, in December 1915. With Norman Tnarp as the leading man, the plot involves an individual whose family and friends attempt to make a business man out of him. Prentice was a player in this humorous show pertaining to a male Dora.

She acted the role of Chow Wan, the maid to Due Jung Fah, in a 1916 revival of The Yellow Jacket, staged in ten matinee shows at the Cort Theatre. The Chinese play was written by George C. Hazelton. The theme of the entertainment had a ubiquitous appeal, concentrating on mother love, rake's progress, young romance, and retribution.

== Later career ==
In May 1923 Prentice and Cornelia Otis Skinner acted in the first theatrical effort of Eleanor Robson Belmont. Co-written with Harriet Ford, In The Next Room was an adaptation of a short story by Burton E. Stevenson. Winthrop Ames and Guthrie McClintic produced the play in Atlantic City, New Jersey.

Prentice performed the lead in the annual entertainment for the Garden School Alumnae Association on February 13, 1925. The benefit assisted the Alice Chapin Adoption Nursery and was held at the Ritz-Carlton in New York City.

Following many years on the New York stage and tours of the Orient with the Frawley company, she opted for domestic life for several years in California. She returned to the theater in an Arthur Freed production of Loving Ladies written by Margaret Mayo and Aubrey Kennedy. Performances began at the Orange Grove Theater in Los Angeles, California. The show entertained with continuous action covering a story which lasted three hours. After the Orange Grove engagement Prentice was offered a chance to make a motion picture series of farces. One studio was confirmed to have made her an offer.

She played the title role, a petite Chinese princess, in Turandot, which opened at the Pasadena Playhouse in January 1927. The tale of old China was one of a succession of oriental parts she had depicted. Her cruel nature as the character turns warm-hearted only when she finds a lover who can solve her three riddles. Prentice's costumes are lovely. In Amber, she acted the role of the nautch dancer only a short time before.

In March 1927 Ruth Helen Davis produced Smilin Thru at the Belmont Theater at Vermont and First Street Playhouse, in Los Angeles. Prentice played the dual roles of Kathleen Dungannon and Moonyeen opposite English actor Wyndham Standing. Prentice was praised by a critic for her radiant presence and skill in performing two characters and a difficult and emotional third act.

== Death ==
Beatrice Prentice died in Los Angeles on May 30, 1977, aged 92, from pneumonia.

== Filmography ==
Year	Title	Role	Notes
1916	Nearly a King	Mayra	First film role and final role
