= Nearly a King =

1916 film by Frederick A. Thomson

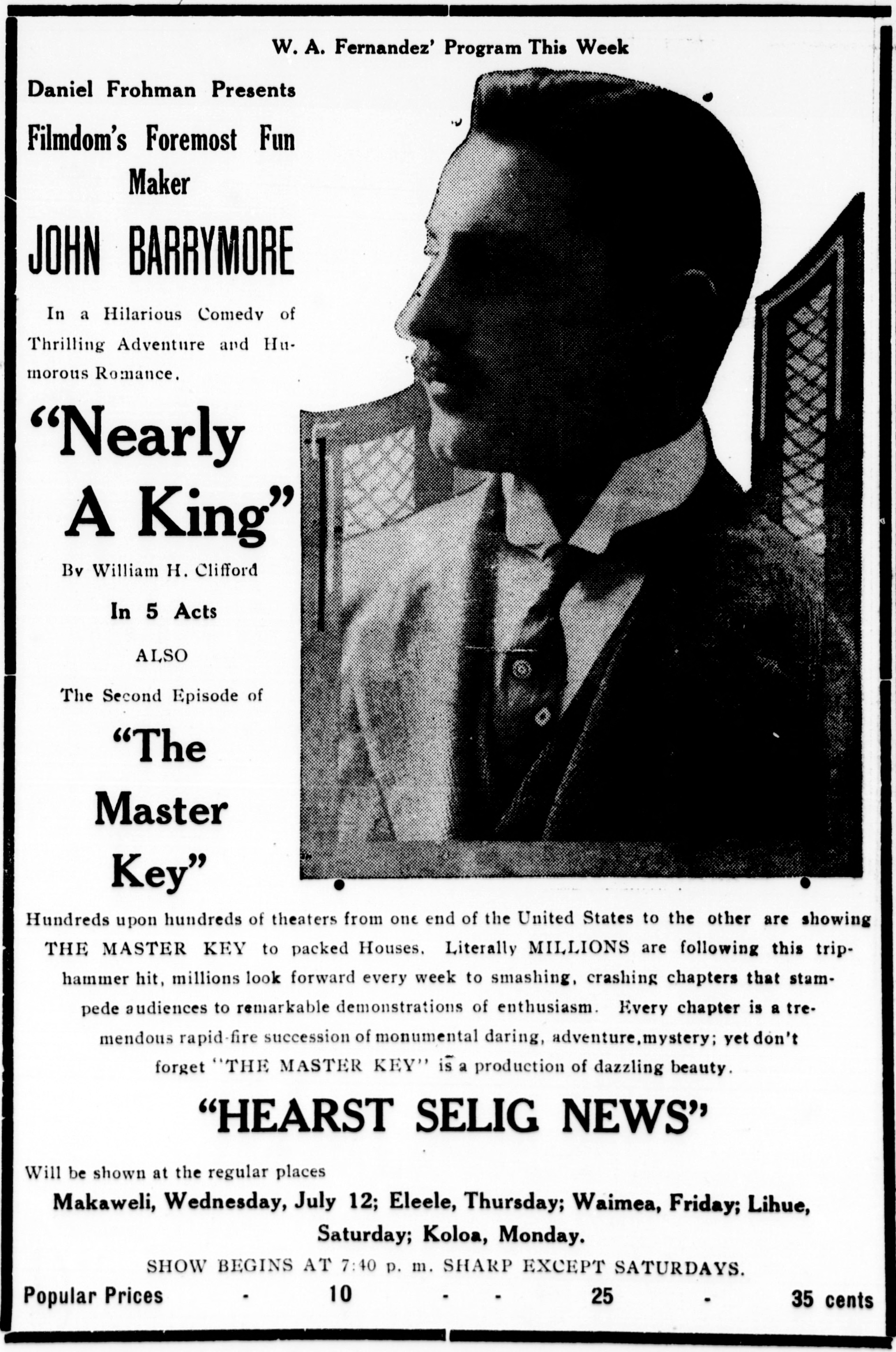
- Newspaper advertisement
- Directed by: Frederick A. Thomson
- Written by: William Clifford (orig. screen story)
- Produced by: Adolph Zukor
- Starring: John Barrymore
- Distributed by: Paramount Pictures
- Release date: February 10, 1916
- Running time: 5 reels
- Country: United States
- Language: Silent film(English intertitles)

Nearly a King is a 1916 silent film romantic comedy directed by Frederick A. Thomson, produced by Famous Players Film Company and distributed by Paramount Pictures. John Barrymore stars in a story written for the screen. Barrymore's first wife Katherine Corri Harris makes her screen debut with him in this picture. Frederick Thomson directed and this is now a lost film.

One of the earliest screen appearances of a young Adolphe Menjou, just 25 years old.

== Cast ==
- John Barrymore - 1.Jack Merriwell, 2. The Prince of Bulwana, 3.himself-an out of work actor)
- Katherine Corri Harris - The Princess
- Russell Bassett - Regent of Okam
- Beatrice Prentice - Marya
- Martin Alsop - Grant Mason
- Fred McGuirk - Olaf
- Adolphe Menjou - Baron

== See also ==
- John Barrymore filmography
