= Katherine Corri Harris =

American socialite, golfer and actress (1890–1927)

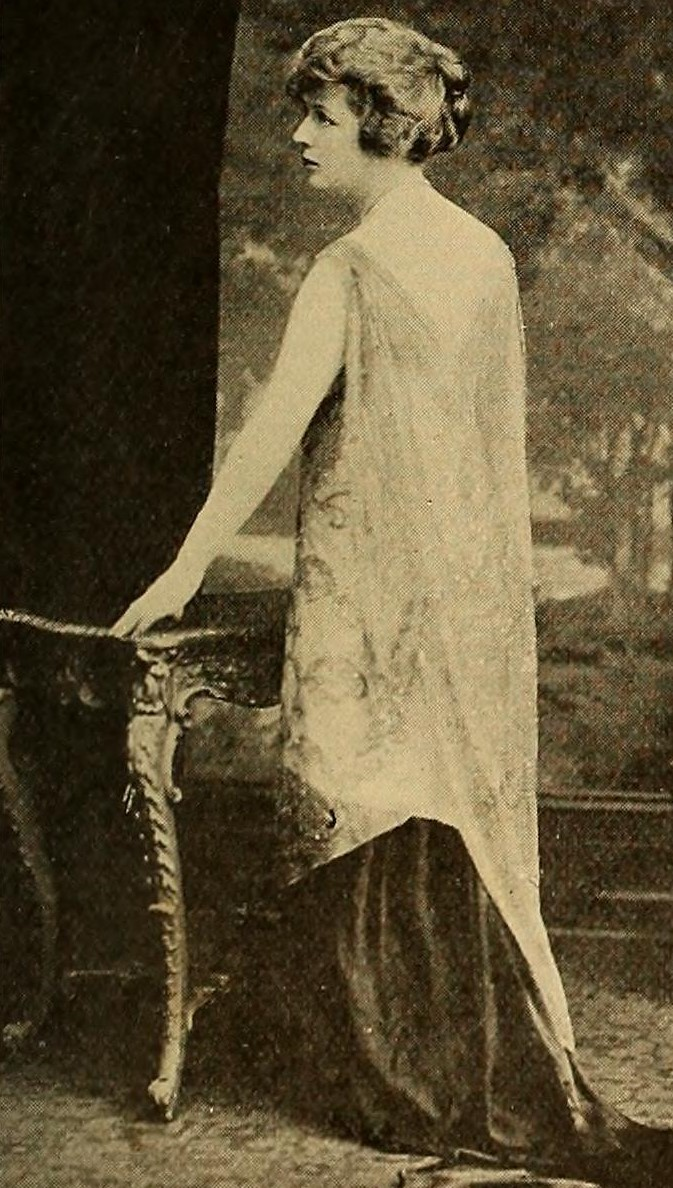
From The House of Mirth (1918)

Katherine Corri Harris (October 1, 1890 – May 2, 1927) was an American actress and socialite. She appeared in several stage plays and three silent films, and was the first wife of actor John Barrymore.

The daughter of Sidney and Katharine Maude (née Brady) Harris, she grew up in wealth and privilege and was a product of high society. She was married to John Barrymore from 1910 to 1917. After their divorce, she remarried, in 1923, to Alfred Dallas Bache Pratt, a broker; the date on which that union ended is unclear. She married, thirdly, in 1925, to Leon Orlowski (secretary of the Polish Legation); the year that union ended is unknown.

As Katherine Harris Barrymore, she appeared in two of Barrymore's now lost silent films: Nearly a King (1916) and The Lost Bridegroom (1916). In 1918, she starred as Lily Bart in the silent film version of Edith Wharton's 1905 novel, The House of Mirth, directed by Albert Capellani.

When she died from pneumonia in 1927 in New York City, aged 36, Barrymore was at her bedside. She was interred in Trinity Church Cemetery and Mausoleum, New York, New York.
