= The Lost Bridegroom =

1916 film by James Kirkwood

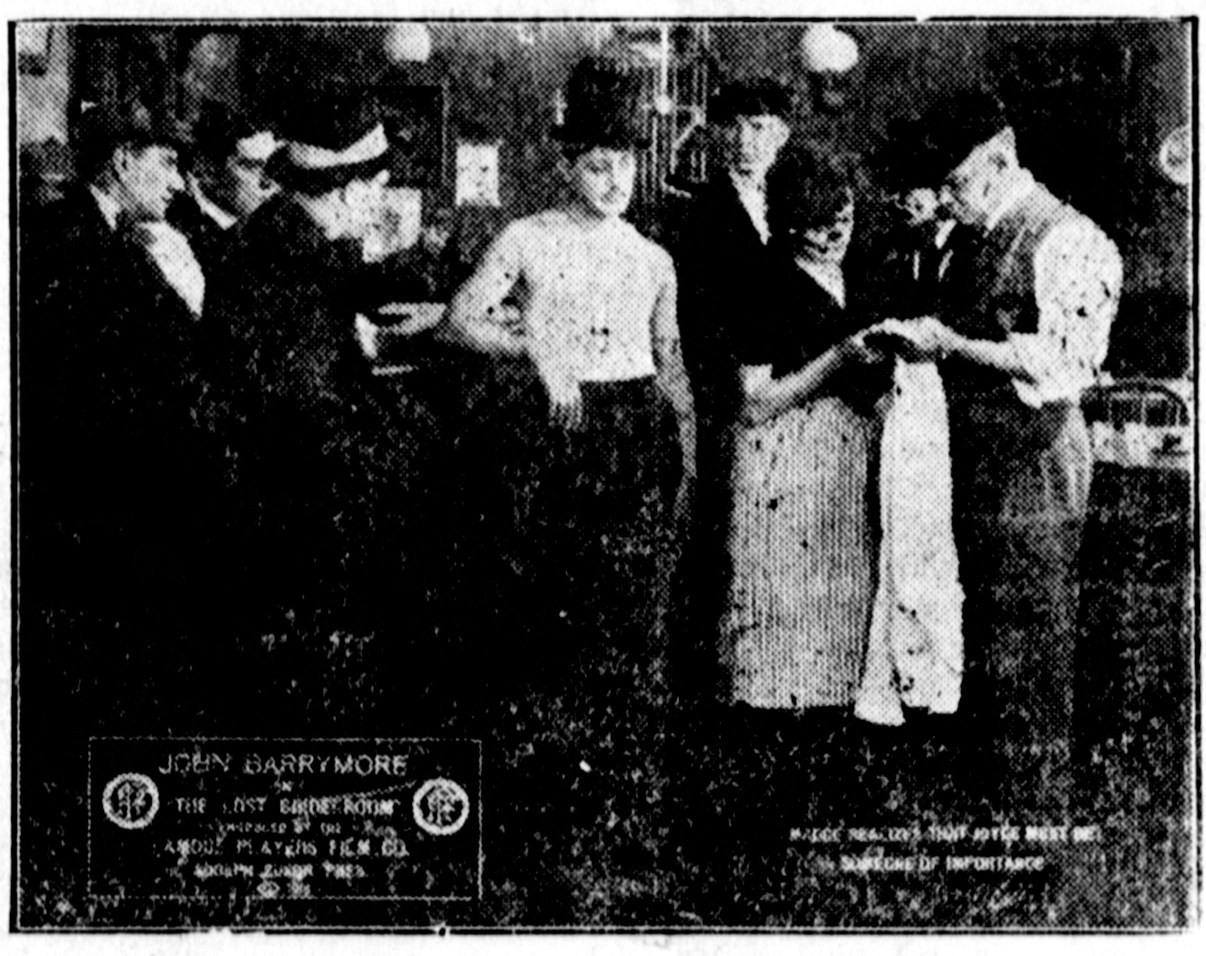
- Film still featured in contemporary newspaper
- Directed by: James Kirkwood
- Based on: "The Man Who Was Lost" by Willard Mack
- Produced by: Adolph Zukor (Famous Players)
- Starring: John Barrymore
- Cinematography: H. Lyman Broening
- Distributed by: Paramount Pictures
- Release date: March 20, 1916
- Running time: 5 reels; (50 minutes)
- Country: United States
- Language: Silent (English intertitles)

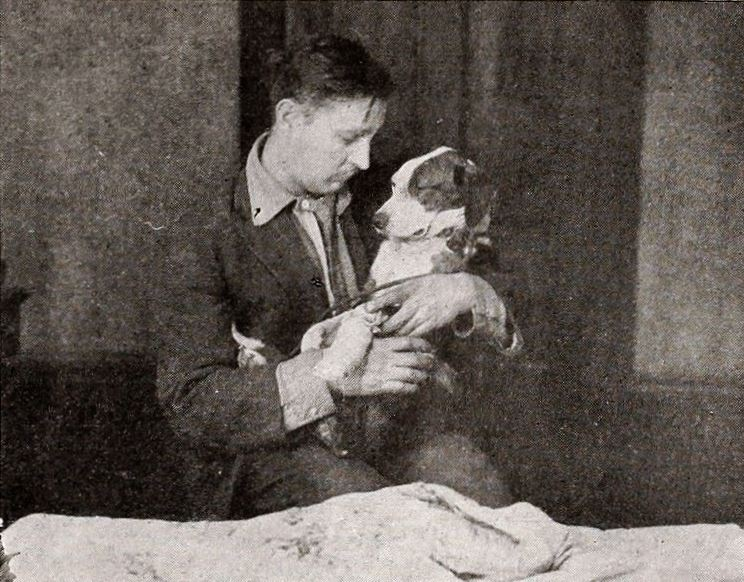
Barrymore and pooch in a tender scene.

The Lost Bridegroom a 1916 American silent comedy film produced by Adolph Zukor starring John Barrymore. Appearing alongside Barrymore in this film is his first wife Katherine Corri Harris. It was based on the short story titled "The Man Who Was Lost" by Willard Mack with James Kirkwood as its director. The film had the alternative title His Lost Self and was rereleased by Paramount on April 17, 1919 as part of their "Success Series", a celebration of some of the company's early screen triumphs.

== Plot ==
As described in a film magazine, young society chap Bertie Joyce is returning from his bachelor's dinner on the eve of his marriage to Dorothy Hardin when he is accosted by thieves and struck on the head. His memory completely obliterated by the blow, Joyce wanders down to the river front and, still well-dressed, enters a saloon, which happens to be the headquarters of a band of thieves. They are all for throwing him out, but the proprietor's daughter Madge comes to his aid and he is fed. The thieves then decide that he could add class to the gang as a gentleman burglar, so he is trained to open safes. Newspapers note the disappearance of the young Joyce, the vast assortment of wedding gifts, and the weeping near-bride. It looks like a rich haul for the gang and Joyce and two other crooks are sent to rob Joyce's fiancée's house. While they are inside, Dorothy interrupts the crooks, and Joyce instinctively shields her from a blow from one of the crooks. A desperate fight ensues, and the two fall down a flight of 18 steps, and at the bottom Joyce lands and is stunned. The police arrive and a doctor is summoned, who declares that a minor operation will restore Joyce's memory. Afterwards, Joyce has no recall of his time with the underworld, but believes he is recovering from the hilarity of his bachelor dinner. Dorothy, now married to him, has promised to never tell otherwise.

== Cast ==
- John Barrymore as Bertie Joyce
- Katherine Corri Harris as Dorothy Hardin (credited as Katherine Harris Barrymore)
- Ida Darling as Mrs. Amelia Hardin
- June Dale as Madge McQuirk
- Hardee Kirkland as Black McQuirk, the saloonkeeper
- Eddie Sturgis as Slim Denny (credited as Edward Sturgis)
- John T. Dillon as Crook
- Tammany Young as Crook
- Fred Williams

=== Uncredited ===
- James Kirkwood
- William Sherwood

== Production ==
Director James Kirkwood later stated that Barrymore was binge drinking during the making of this film, and spent a large amount of time downing drinks in a saloon. These delays caused the production to drag (thus costs go up), so Kirkwood went down to the saloon and 'motioned' to Barrymore to either return to work or that he would sling the actor over his shoulders and carry him back to the set to finish filming.

== Preservation ==
With no holdings located in archives, The Lost Bridegroom is considered a lost film.

== See also ==
- John Barrymore filmography
