= Hollis Alpert =

American film critic (1916–2007)

Hollis Alpert (September 24, 1916 – November 18, 2007) was an American film critic and author. Alpert was best known as the cofounder of the National Society of Film Critics, which he started in his New York City apartment.

== Early life ==
Hollis Alpert was born in Herkimer, New York, on September 24, 1916, to Abram and Myra Alpert. Alpert's father, Abram, left the family when he was still very young. His mother, Myra, ran a bra and girdle factory.

He joined the U.S. Army during World War II and served as a combat historian. He often wrote historical accounts of major World War II battles. He also wrote pieces on the war which appeared in American magazines.

== Career ==
Following his departure from the Army, Alpert found employment as an assistant fiction editor for the New York Times from 1950 to 1956. He simultaneously worked as a freelance film and book reviewer for a number of other publications. His freelance work led to his securing a position as a film critic for the Saturday Review, which he held until 1975. Alpert then worked for the American Film Magazine as an editor for the next six years. In 1966 he was a member of the jury at the 16th Berlin International Film Festival.

=== National Society of Film Critics ===
The National Society of Film Critics was founded in Hollis Alpert's New York City living room in 1966 by a group of film critics who had been denied membership in the New York Film Critics Circle, a group that favored critics employed by mainstream newspapers and publications. Alpert was working for the Saturday Review at the time. The New Yorker's film critic, Pauline Kael, was also instrumental in the founding of the National Society.

The National Society of Film Critics referred to itself as a "national" group, despite the fact that all of its founding members were from New York, because most of its members wrote for publications with a national readership. Many joined Alpert's new group in order to counteract the influence of the then New York Times film critic, Bosley Crowther. In 2007, there were over 60 members of the society writing for weekly and daily newspapers.

According to another founding member, Joe Morgenstern, Alpert "was widely seen as a serious, knowledgeable, dedicated film critic. The Saturday Review . . . was a considerable presence on the scene then when movie reviews mattered and were taken seriously as an intellectual matter."

== Death ==
Hollis Alpert died of pneumonia in Naples, Florida, on November 18, 2007. He was 91 years old.

== Bibliography of works authored ==
=== Novels ===
- The Summer Lovers (1958)
- Some Other Time (1960)
- For Immediate Release (1963)
- The People Eaters (1972)
- Smash (1973)
- How to Play Double Bogey Golf (1975)

=== Biographies ===
- The Barrymores (1964)
- Fellini: A Life (1986)

=== Histories ===
- The Life and Times of Porgy and Bess (1990)
- Broadway! 125 Years of Musical Theatre (1991)
