= Tiger Rose =

Tiger Rose may refer to:

- Tiger Rose (play), an American play written by Willard Mack
- Tiger Rose (1923 film), a 1923 silent film adventure romance
- Tiger Rose (1929 film), a 1929 early sound adventure film
- Tiger Rose, a 1975 album by Robert Hunter
