= Beatrice Banyard =

American screenwriter and actress

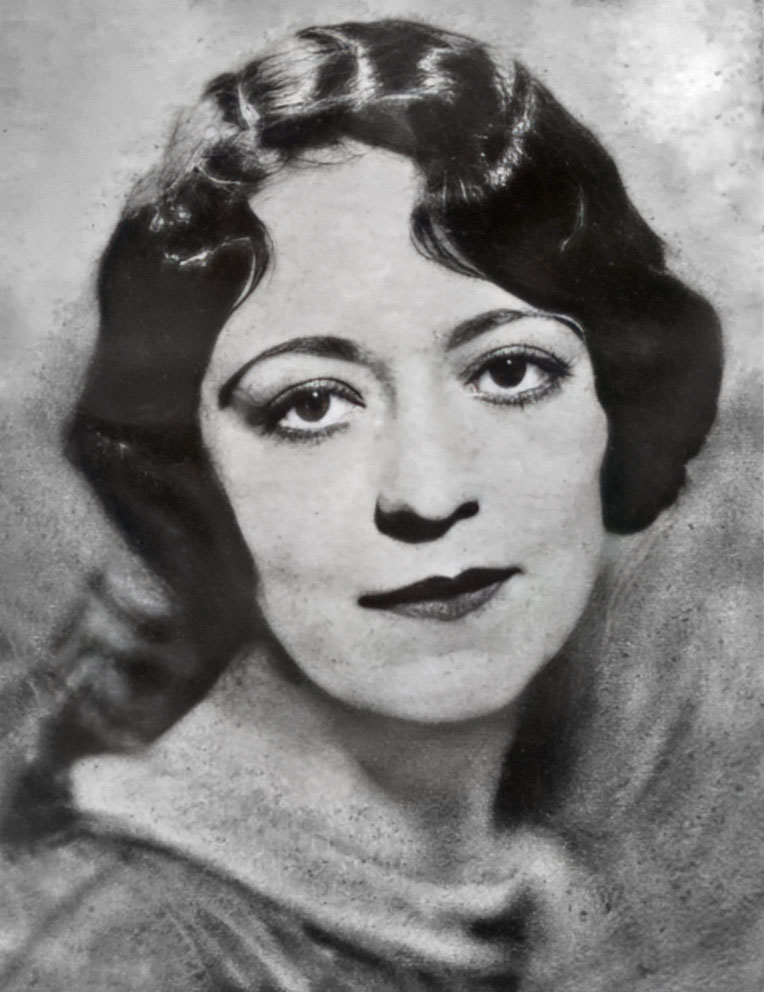
- Banyard in 1928 theatre production The Scarlet Fox
- Born: Beatrice Frances Banyard; February 11, 1897; Spring Valley, Iowa, USA
- Died: February 1, 1968 (aged 70); Los Angeles, California USA
- Other names: Beatrice Beebe
- Occupation(s): Screenwriter, actress
- Years active: 1929–1933
- Spouse: Willard Mack

Beatrice Banyard was an American screenwriter and actress active in the late 1930s and early 1940s.

== Biography ==
Beatrice was born in Spring Valley, Iowa, to A.T. Banyard and Ida Burnett, the second of two daughters. She grew up primarily in Salt Lake City, Utah, where she was a well-known society girl. She began acting in plays in the area as a young teenager.

She married John Stone in 1917; the pair had two children but were soon divorced. After the split, she began a career on the stage, at which point she was reacquainted with playwright, film director, and actor Willard Mack, whom she met when she was 12. He made her his fourth (and final) wife in 1927. She left him soon afterward, but the pair reconciled and remained married until his death in 1934.

She continued acting through the 1920s and early 1930s, and around 1931, she began writing film scenarios after she and Mack moved to Los Angeles, where he was contracted by MGM as a writer. She also appeared in a few films as an actress, including What Price Innocence? and The Voice of the City, both of which Mack directed.

She enjoyed car-racing, and was noted as one of the best women racers in the U.S. She also held a number of dirt-track records on the West Coast.

== Selected filmography ==
As a writer:

- Myrt and Marge (1933)
- Strictly Personal (1933)
- The Billion Dollar Scandal (1931)
- Reducing (1931) (dialogue)

As an actress:

- What Price Innocence? (1933)
- The Voice of the City (1929)
