= The Ragged Edge (film) =

1923 film by F. Harmon Weight

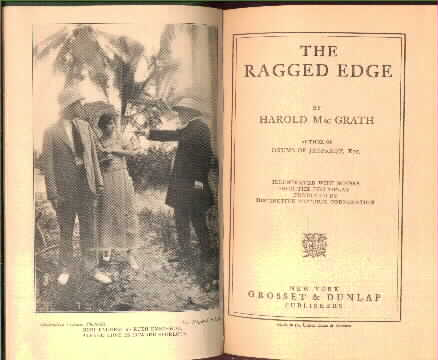
- Open leaf of the novel with illustration
- Directed by: F. Harmon Weight
- Written by: Forrest Halsey (adaptation)
- Based on: The Ragged Edge by Harold McGrath
- Produced by: Distinctive Pictures (founded by George Arliss)
- Starring: Alfred Lunt; Mona Palma
- Cinematography: probably Harry Fischbeck from Lunt's first film Backbone
- Distributed by: Goldwyn-Cosmopolitan Productions
- Release date: June 4, 1923
- Running time: 7 reels; 6,800 feet
- Country: United States
- Language: Silent (English intertitles)

The Ragged Edge is a 1923 American silent South Seas romantic drama film produced by George Arliss with his Distinctive Pictures and distributed by Goldwyn and Cosmopolitan productions. It was directed by F. Harmon Weight and starred Alfred Lunt.

== Cast ==
- Alfred Lunt as Howard Spurlock
- Mona Palma as Ruth Endicott (credited as Mimi Palmeri)
- Charles Fang as Ah Cum
- Wallace Erskine as The quack doctor
- George MacQuarrie as McClintock
- Charles Slattery as O'Higgins
- Christian Frank as The Drunk Wastrel
- Grace Griswold as Prudence Jedson
- Alice May as Angelina Jedson
- Percy Carr as Bartender
- Marie Day as The Drunk Aunt
- Charles Kent as Reverend Luther Enschede
- Hattie Delaro as Mrs. Dalby

== Preservation ==
With no prints of The Ragged Edge located in any film archives, it is a lost film.
