= Midnight Madness (1928 film) =

1928 film

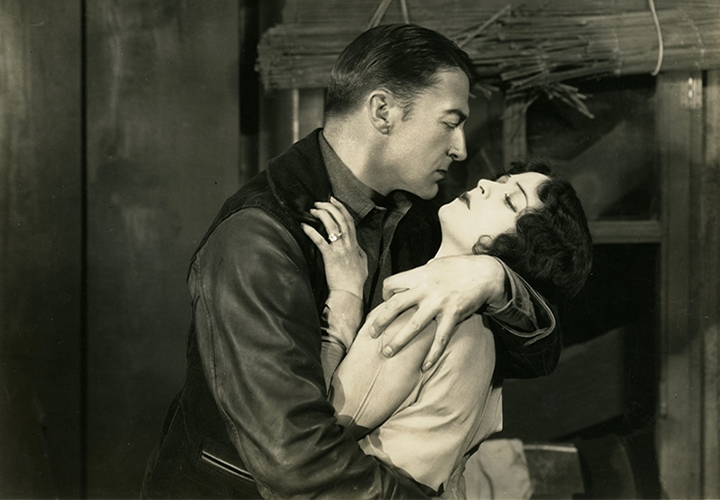
- Clive Brook and Jacqueline Logan
- Directed by: F. Harmon Weight
- Written by: Robert N. Lee(adaptation); Edwin Justus Mayer(titles)
- Based on: play The Lion Trap by Daniel Nathan Rubin
- Produced by: DeMille Pictures Corp. Hector Turnbull
- Starring: Jacqueline Logan
- Cinematography: David Abel
- Edited by: Harold McLernon
- Distributed by: Pathé Exchange
- Release date: March 25, 1928
- Running time: 6 reels
- Country: USA
- Language: Silent ..English titles

Midnight Madness is a 1928 silent film drama directed by F. Harmon Weight and starring Jacqueline Logan. It was produced by Cecil B. DeMille's DeMille Pictures Corporation and released through Pathé Exchange.

Prints are preserved at the Museum of Modern Art, Library of Congress and New Zealand Film Archive. A video of the preserved film is available for viewing at the website of the National Film Preservation Foundation.

== Cast ==
- Jacqueline Logan - Norma Forbes
- Clive Brook - Richard Bream
- Walter McGrail - Arthur Childers
- James Bradbury - John Forbes
- Oscar Smith - Manubo
- Vadim Uraneff - Joe
- Louis Natheaux - Masher
- Clarence Burton - A sailor
- Virginia Sale - The Gargoyle
- Frank Hagney - Harris
- Emmett King - Robert Strong
- Sidney Bracey - Bream's Valet (*uncredited)
- Broderick O'Farrell - Bream's friend at Café (*uncredited)
