= Dishonored (film) =

1931 American film

- Theatrical release poster
- Directed by: Josef von Sternberg
- Screenplay by: Daniel N. Rubin
- Story by: Josef von Sternberg
- Starring: Marlene Dietrich; Victor McLaglen; Gustav von Seyffertitz; Warner Oland
- Cinematography: Lee Garmes
- Edited by: Josef von Sternberg
- Music by: Karl Hajos; Herman Hand
- Production company: Paramount Pictures
- Distributed by: Paramount Pictures
- Release date: March 5, 1931 (New York)
- Running time: 91 minutes
- Country: United States
- Language: English

Dishonored is a 1931 American pre-Code Paramount Pictures romantic spy film directed and edited by Josef von Sternberg, who also cowrote the film with Daniel N. Rubin. The film stars Marlene Dietrich, Victor McLaglen, Gustav von Seyffertitz and Warner Oland. Costume design was provided by Travis Banton in one of his several collaborations with Dietrich.

== Plot ==
In 1915 Vienna, the chief of the Austrian secret service meets prostitute Marie Kolverer, a war widow and accomplished pianist who is very attached to her pet black cat. He poses as a foreign agent to test her loyalty and, to his satisfaction, she quietly alerts a constable. The gentleman establishes his credentials and invites Marie to see him at central intelligence headquarters.

The chief explains to Marie that the Austrian forces have been suffering terrible losses resulting from a security leak, and that he needs an attractive female to serve as a secret agent to expose Colonel von Hindau, whom he suspects is the traitor. Marie takes the assignment and enlists in the secret service as Agent X-27.

X-27 (Marie) attracts Hindau's attention is invited to his apartment. As she is pretending to seduce Hindau, the chief places a telephone call to him, leaving X-27 free to search his personal belongings. She removes a secret message hidden in a cigarette. When Hindau returns to discover that his cover has been compromised, he shoots himself. The secret message leads X-27 to a casino, where she finds the man who had given Hindau the cigarette, the Russian spy Colonel Kranau. However, he senses danger and escapes. When X-27 reports her failure, the chief orders her to disengage, saying that Kranau "is too clever to be trapped by a woman".

Later that night, Kranau surreptitiously enters X-27's home and discovers the orders for X-27's next assignment: to fly over the Polish border, infiltrate the Russian headquarters there and acquire the timetable for an imminent military offensive. He empties X-27's pistol and disables the telephone before confronting her. She attempts to delay him with a kiss, but he flees.

Behind enemy lines, X-27 disguises herself as a dimwitted peasant girl and gains employment as a chambermaid in the Russian officers' quarters. She seduces Colonel Kovrin and obtains the top-secret plans for the attack, which she copies in code that resembles sheet-music notation. Kranau observes X-27's cat stalking the hallway, alerting him to her presence. After a brief chase, he captures her and discovers her notes. When he tries to play the atonal piece on the piano, he realizes that it is actually code and burns the paper, confident he has thwarted X-27's mission.

Kranau informs X-27 that she will be executed the next morning, but he has fallen in love with her. After they spend the night together, X-27 drugs him and escapes back to Austria. As she had memorized the coded musical notation when Kranau played it, she is able to reconstruct the plans. Armed with this information, the Austrians crush the Russian offensive.

Thousands of Russian troops are captured, including Kranau. When Austrian secret service agents, with X-27 in attendance, examine the prisoners, Kranau is identified as Agent H-14 and taken into custody. X-27 pretends not to know him but requests to interrogate him privately, ostensibly to extract valuable information before he is executed. She pretends to accidentally drop her gun, permitting him to escape. She is arrested, convicted of treason and sentenced to death.

When a monk visits her while she is awaiting execution, X-27 requests a piano in her cell and to wear her old clothing, and both requests are granted. Standing before the firing squad, Marie declines a blindfold and coolly applies lipstick. After a short delay caused by a futile protest from a youthful officer, she is shot.

== Cast ==
- Marlene Dietrich as Marie Kolverer/Agent X-27
- Victor McLaglen as Colonel Kranau
- Gustav von Seyffertitz as Chief of Austrian Secret Service
- Warner Oland as Colonel von Hindau
- Lew Cody as Colonel Kovrin
- Barry Norton as Young Lieutenant
- Max Barwyn as Colonel Kranau's Aide (uncredited)
- B.F. Blinn as Gambler with Glasses (uncredited)
- Allan Cavan as Secret Service Agent in Casino (uncredited)
- Davison Clark as Court-Martial Officer (uncredited)
- Alexis Davidoff as Officer (uncredited)
- William B. Davidson as 2nd Firing Squad Officer (uncredited)
- Walter Downing as Old Officer (uncredited)
- Geraldine Dvorak as Casino Patron (uncredited)
- Adolph Faylauer as Gambler (uncredited)
- Joseph W. Girard as Russian Officer (uncredited)
- Al Hart as Monk (uncredited)
- Ramsay Hill as Grinning Officer (uncredited)
- George Irving as Contact at Cafe (uncredited)
- Ethan Laidlaw as Russian Corporal (uncredited)
- Tom London as Minor Role (uncredited)
- Wilfred Lucas as General Dymov (uncredited)
- Ruth Mayhew as Accident Victim (uncredited)
- Harold Nelson as Fritz, von Hindau's Valet (uncredited)
- Paul Panzer as Austrian Soldier at Interrogation (uncredited)
- Bill Powell as Hotel Manager (uncredited)
- Buddy Roosevelt as Russian Captain of the Guard (uncredited)
- Scott Seaton as Minor Role (uncredited)
- Harry Semels as Waiter (uncredited)

== Production ==
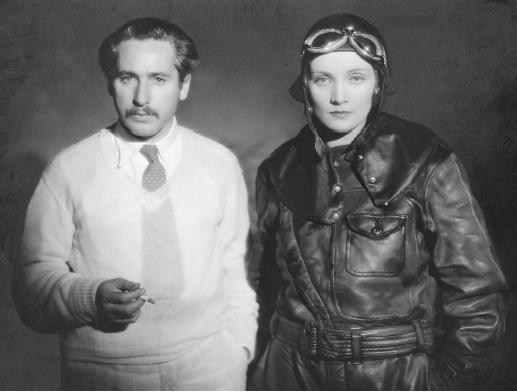
Josef von Sternberg and Marlene Dietrich on set

Sternberg based the story loosely on the exploits and demise of Dutch spy Mata Hari, with the screenplay written by Daniel Nathan Rubin. The title Dishonored was selected by studio executives over Sternberg's objections. Sternberg said that "the lady spy was not dishonored, but killed by firing squad" and felt that the title would distort the significance of her death.

The film was rushed into production by Paramount to capitalize on the critical and popular success of Sternberg's films The Blue Angel and Morocco from the previous year, both starring Marlene Dietrich. MGM responded with the similar film Mata Hari later in the year.

Gary Cooper, who had starred with Dietrich in Morocco, was considered for the role of Kranau, but he was hesitant to work again with Sternberg.

== Reception ==
In a contemporary review for The New York Times, critic Mordaunt Hall wrote: "Miss Dietrich's current picture is for the most part an excellent example of direction with as clever performance by the star. But the story is a clumsy affair and the dialogue is emphatically amateurish. ... 'Dishonored' is often interesting, but it is seldom credible. It has some extraordinarily good ideas, but though they are often directed with imagination they are set forth too hurriedly to be convincing or more than moderately effective."

== Sources ==
- Chicago Film Society. Dishonored at the Portage Theatre. May 14, 2011. Retrieved May 17, 2018. http://www.chicagofilmsociety.org/2011/05/
- Kehr, Dave. 2012. That Well-Lighted Agent of Desire. New York Times, May 3, 2012. Retrieved May 17, 2018. https://www.nytimes.com/2012/03/04/movies/homevideo/marlene-dietrichs-dishonored-and-shanghai-express.html
- Richey, Jeremy. 2008. Overlooked Classics: Dishonored. Moon in the Gutter, March 2, 2008. Retrieved May 17, 2018. http://mooninthegutter.blogspot.com/2008/03/overlooked-classic-of-week-dishonored.html
- Sarris, Andrew. 1966. The Films of Josef von Sternberg. Museum of Modern Art/Doubleday. New York, New York.
- White, Brynn. 2010. Dishonored. Not Coming to a Theatre Near You, August 19, 2010. Retrieved May 17, 2018. http://www.notcoming.com/reviews/dishonored/
