= Lottie Briscoe =

American actress

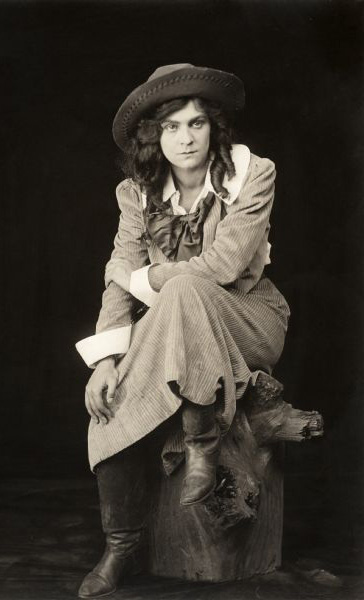
- Still photo of Briscoe from The Beloved Adventurer (1914)
- Born: April 19, 1883; St. Louis, Missouri, U.S.
- Died: March 21, 1950 (aged 66); New York City, U.S.
- Other name: Little Lottie Briscoe
- Spouses: Harry McRae Webster (m. 1903; div. 1911) Harry Mountford (m. 1921)

Lottie Briscoe (April 19, 1883 – March 21, 1950) was an American stage and silent screen actress. She began in theatre at the age of four and as an adult was among the first to find success after making the transition from the legitimate stage to cinema. Briscoe appeared in over 94 motion pictures; she is perhaps best remembered for her time at Lubin Studios with co-star Arthur V. Johnson.

== Family ==
Lottie Briscoe was born in St. Louis, Missouri, to Mr. and Mrs. T. D. Briscoe. Her father may have been involved in theatre work and her mother was known to the theatre community as a likable stage mother. A sister, Olive Helen Briscoe, had a long career in vaudeville as a singer and comedian. At the time of her death The New York Times reported that Briscoe was 79 years old, which is unlikely, for it is well documented that she was active as a child actor as late as 1895. A possible explanation may lie with confusion involving Briscoe's frail husband, Harry Mountford, who at the time was 79 and had not long to live.

== Stage ==
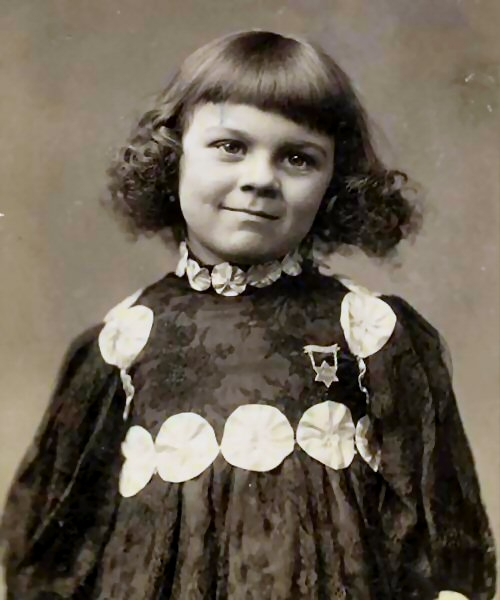
Little Lottie Briscoe The New York Public Library Digital Gallery

Briscoe first appeared on stage at the age of four, and by nine she was touring as Editha in Gus Thomas' adaptation of Frances Burnett's children's story Editha's Burglar. Three years later, in June 1895, she was engaged at the Fifth Avenue Theatre, New York, to play Julian Esmond in the Russ Whytal melodrama For Fair Virginia, but was replaced after just two nights when the mayor's office determined that the weather was too hot for a child under sixteen to be working in. Briscoe eventually did return to For Fair Virginia to play Julian Esmond over a subsequent road tour that lasted well into the spring of 1897. By October 1897 Briscoe was back at the Fifth Avenue Theatre with Richard Mansfield's company as Essie in the American debut of Shaw's The Devil's Disciple. In 1899 she toured with Walter E. Perkins playing Gertie in a farce-comedy entitled My Friend from India by Henry A. Du Souchet.

During the 1900–1901 season Briscoe assumed the role of the sickly boy Claude in a national tour of Two Little Vagrants, Charles Klein's adaptation of the Pierre Decourcelle melodrama Les Deux Gosses. The following season she began a long tour playing Asa opposite Paul Gilmore in Lost River; advertised as a pastoral melodrama by Joseph Arthur. In 1905 Briscoe toured in the Harry McRae Webster military drama Lieutenant Dick, U. S. A. playing Machita to Webster's Sergeant Jones. By this time, Briscoe and Webster had been married for two years.

== Film ==
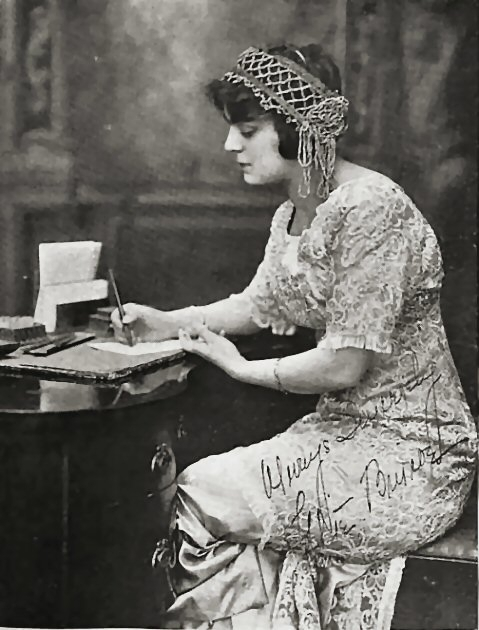
Lottie Briscoe The Belovéd Adventurer 1914

Around 1909 Briscoe, along with Harry McRae Webster, joined the fledgling Essanay Studios, Chicago. At least two films during this period, both one-reelers from January 1911, are known to exist today; The Sophomore’s Romance and A Sin Unpardonable. In June 1911 she played Zenia in Essanay's His Friend's Wife, remembered for Francis X. Bushman's film debut. Her peak years were with Lubin Studios in short films that often cast her with the actor-director Arthur V. Johnson. Their most ambitious project together during this period was probably The Belovéd Adventurer (1914), a 15-episode serial written by Emmett Campbell Hall. When Johnson died in January 1916, shortly after the release of their latest film, the Maie B. Hovey story The Lost Rose, Briscoe left film and did not return until 1918, and then only briefly to play Gertie Farish in The House of Mirth.

== Later years ==
In 1919, Briscoe began a long run in vaudeville playing the title role in a domestic comedy by George Kelly entitled Mrs. Wellington's Surprise. That October 19, she was among a group of celebrities who performed at the Manhattan Opera House in a benefit on behalf of the Chelsea Memorial Association in raising funds for the Chelsea Park Memorial in Manhattan, one of a number of such memorials erected in the city during this time honoring local residents who gave their lives during the First World War. In February 1922, Briscoe signed to appear in a leading role with William Faversham in The Squaw Man. At some point in the not too distant future, serious health issues would leave Briscoe homebound for the remainder of her life.

Her first husband, Harry McRae Webster, became a motion picture director of some note before he was sued in the early 1920s by a film studio over the unauthorized use of nude models in one of his movies. Her second husband, Harry Mountford, served as a longtime executive secretary for the White Rats actors union.

Briscoe died on March 21, 1950, in New York, and her husband died on June 5, 1950.

== Selected filmography ==
- His Wife's Friend (1911)
- The Shadow of Tragedy (1914)
- The House of Mirth (1918)
