= The Billion Dollar Scandal =

1933 film

- Theatrical release poster
- Directed by: Harry Joe Brown
- Screenplay by: Beatrice Banyard; Willard Mack; Gene Towne
- Starring: Robert Armstrong; Constance Cummings; Olga Baclanova; Frank Morgan; James Gleason; Irving Pichel; Warren Hymer
- Cinematography: Charles J. Stumar
- Edited by: Karl Hajos
- Production company: Paramount Pictures
- Distributed by: Paramount Pictures
- Release date: January 7, 1933
- Running time: 81 minutes
- Country: United States
- Language: English

The Billion Dollar Scandal is a 1933 American pre-Code drama film directed by Harry Joe Brown and written by Beatrice Banyard, Willard Mack and Gene Towne. The film stars Robert Armstrong, Constance Cummings, Olga Baclanova, Frank Morgan, James Gleason, Irving Pichel and Warren Hymer. The film was released on January 7, 1933, by Paramount Pictures.

== Cast ==
- Robert Armstrong as Fingers Partos
- Constance Cummings as Doris Masterson
- Olga Baclanova as Anna aka GoGo
- Frank Morgan as John Dudley Masterson
- James Gleason as Ratsy Harris
- Irving Pichel as Albert Griswold
- Warren Hymer as Kid McGurn
- Sidney Toler as Carter B. Moore
- Berton Churchill as The Warden
- Frank Albertson as Babe Partos
- Walter Walker as Parker
- Edmund Breese as Haddock
- Purnell Pratt as Committee Chairman
- William B. Davidson as Lawrence
- Edward Van Sloan as Attorney Carp
- Hale Hamilton as Jackson
