= Strictly Modern =

1930 film directed by William A. Seiter

- Theatrical poster
- Directed by: William A. Seiter
- Written by: Ray Harris; Gene Towne
- Based on: Cousin Kate (play) by Hubert Henry Davies
- Starring: Dorothy Mackaill; Sidney Blackmer; Julanne Johnston; Warner Richmond
- Cinematography: Sidney Hickox
- Distributed by: First National Pictures
- Release dates: March 2, 1930 (US; Limited release)
- Running time: 63 minutes
- Country: United States
- Language: English

Strictly Modern is a 1930 American pre-Code comedy film directed by William A. Seiter and starring Dorothy Mackaill and Sidney Blackmer. It was produced and released by First National Pictures and was based on a play, Cousin Kate, written by Hubert Henry Davies.

== Plot ==
Kate is a novelist who writes "modern" novels about sex, romance and relationships. She thinks that since she is a strictly modern women she knows everything about men. When she falls in love, she plans to act exactly like the heroines in her novels and expects her future boyfriend to do likewise. Kate attempts to apply the methods that uses in his books to her own life and the lives of those around her. As the film begins, we find out that Mackaill's cousin, Aimee is about to be married to Heath Desmond.

Two days before their marriage Aimee, apparently a prude, tells Heath that there will be no passion in their marriage and that they will strictly observe the sanctity of the Sabbath. Heath, quickly realizing what is in store for him, deserts Aimee and takes the next train out of town. Judge Bartlett, who was to marry the couple, consoles Aimee. Meanwhile, Kate, who is on her way to the expected wedding, meets Heath on the train. Not knowing who he is, Kate quickly falls in love with him.

When Kate learns that Heath is her cousin's fiancé, she pretends that she had only been flirting because she thinks that falling in love with a man who is about to marry someone else is not appropriate. She vows to act in the proper way, the way in which the characters in her "modern" novels would. She does her best to bring Heath and Aimee back together again, even though she still loves Heath.

Kate manages to get them to the altar, but just before the marriage is solemnized Kate, realizing that Aimee is in love with Judge Bartlett, gives the judge a drug. The judge faints and Aimee declares her love for the judge. When the judge recovers, he is married to Aimee, leaving Kate and Heath free to pursue their romance.

== Cast ==
- Dorothy Mackaill as Kate
- Sidney Blackmer as Heath Desmond
- Julanne Johnston as Aimee Spencer
- Warner Richmond as Judge Bartlett
- Mickey Bennett as Bobby Spencer

== Preservation status ==
No film elements are known to survive. The soundtrack was recorded on Vitaphone disks.

== See also ==
- List of lost films
