= Flaming Waters =

1925 film

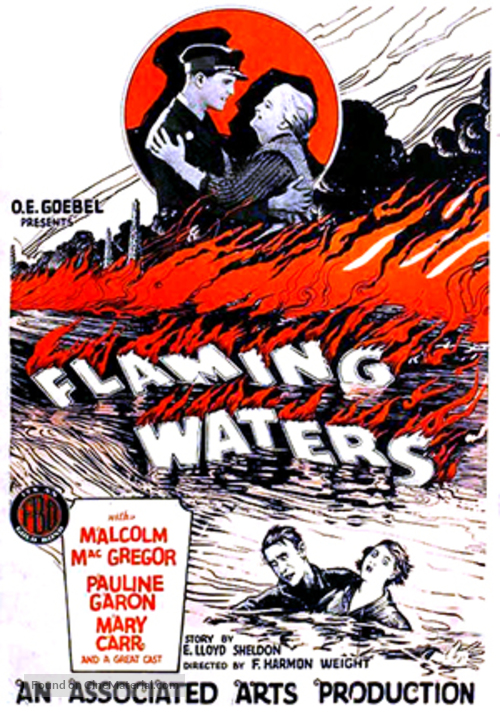
- Poster
- Directed by: F. Harmon Weight
- Written by: Fred Myton; E. Lloyd Sheldon
- Starring: Malcolm McGregor; Pauline Garon; Mary Carr
- Cinematography: William Marshall
- Production company: Associated Arts Corporation
- Distributed by: Film Booking Offices of America
- Release date: December 13, 1925
- Running time: 70 minutes
- Country: United States
- Language: Silent (English intertitles)

Flaming Waters is a 1925 American silent drama film directed by F. Harmon Weight and starring Malcolm McGregor, Pauline Garon, and Mary Carr.

== Plot ==
As described in a film magazine review, Danny O'Neil moves to Oil City with his mother, seeking to find Jasper Thorne, who swindled his mother. He gets the best of Thorne in an oil deal and buys a well that turns out to be a gusher, the spray from its overflow covering the area surrounding their ranch. A lamp thrown by Thorne ignites the oil. Danny's foolish friend Midge Botsford opens the gate on the reservoir, and a flaming flood results. Danny rescues his mother and Doris Laidlaw, and he wins the young woman's heart.

== Cast ==
- Malcolm McGregor as Danny O'Neil
- Pauline Garon as Doris Laidlaw
- Mary Carr as Mrs. Mary O'Neil
- John Miljan as Jasper Thorne
- John Gough as Midge Botsford
- Mayme Kelso as Mrs. Rutherford
- John Elliott as Justin Laidlaw
- Tom McGuire as Officer McGrath
- Michael D. Moore as Dan O'Neil as a boy

== Preservation ==
- A print is preserved in the Library of Congress archive.

== Bibliography ==
- Munden, Kenneth White. The American Film Institute Catalog of Motion Pictures Produced in the United States, Part 1. University of California Press, 1997.
