= The House of Mirth (1918 film) =

1918 film by Albert Capellani

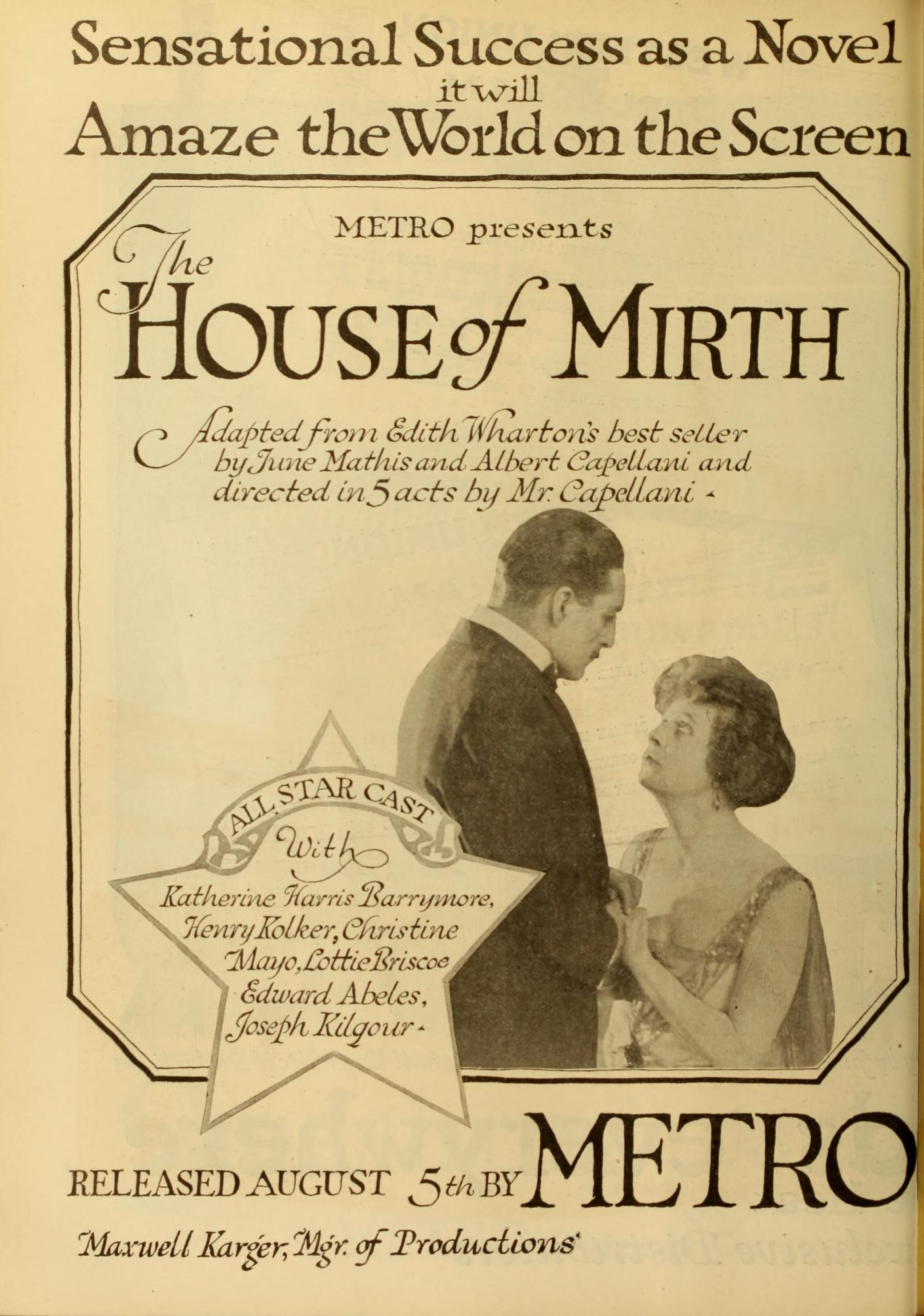
- Advertisement for the film
- Directed by: Albert Capellani
- Screenplay by: Albert Capellani; June Mathis
- Based on: The House of Mirth; 1905 novel by Edith Wharton
- Starring: Katherine Harris Barrymore; Henry Kolker; Christine Mayo
- Cinematography: Eugene Gaudio
- Production company: Metro Pictures Corporation
- Distributed by: Metro Pictures Corporation
- Release date: August 5, 1918
- Running time: 6 reels (1719.07 m)\ 60/70 minutes
- Country: United States
- Language: Silent (English intertitles)

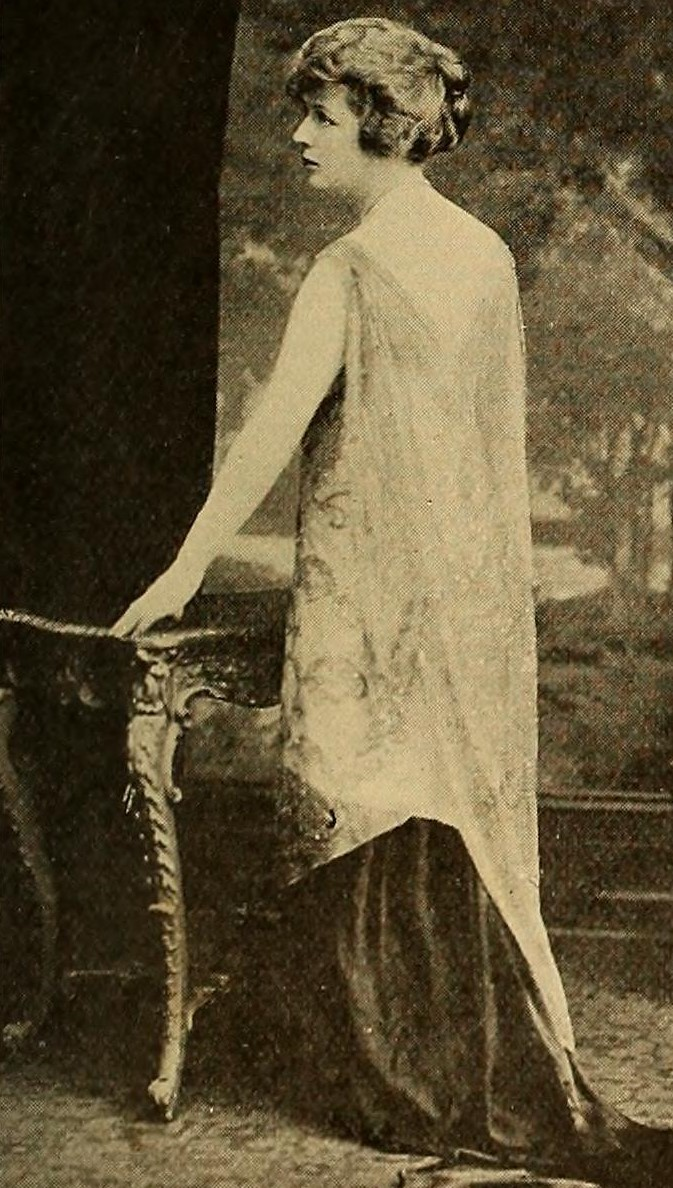
Katherine Harris Barrymore as Lily Bart in The House of Mirth (1918)

The House of Mirth is a 1918 American silent melodrama film directed by French film director Albert Capellani, starring Katherine Harris Barrymore as Lily Bart. It is a cinema adaptation of Edith Wharton's 1905 novel The House of Mirth and the first-ever cinema adaptation of any of her work. Metro Pictures put many efforts into the film in order to turn the original novel into an "all-star cast" film to earn popularity, as Metro Pictures itself announced that the film was "one of the most important productions" during 1918, and that the film contained "the strongest and the most distinguished cast ever selected for the screen". Initially, Emmy Wehlen starred in the role of Lily Bart in the film. Later, she was replaced by Katherine Harris Barrymore. The film contributed to the huge success of Metro Pictures that year. It is not known whether the film currently survives.

== Plot ==
Penniless socialite orphan Lily Bart is living with her wealthy aunt who insists that she take to herself a rich husband. Balking at this idea and remaining faithful to her impecunious sweetheart Lawrence Selden (Henry Kolker), Lily is desirous of maintaining her luxurious lifestyle: she accepts the financial "favors" of some married millionaires but refuses to surrender her virtue in return – until she discovers that her saintly Selden has been fooling around with another man's wife.

In the original novel, Lily Bart dies after taking poison to commit suicide; however, in the film, the ending remained open as Selden's cousin comes to rescue her after she poisoned herself, and the film ended here, without further explanation.

== Cast ==
- Katherine Harris Barrymore as Lily Bart
- Henry Kolker as Lawrence Selden
- Christine Mayo as Bertha Trenor-Dorset
- Joseph Kilgour as Augustus Trenor-Dorset
- Edward Abeles as Simon Rosedale
- W. D. Fisher as Ned Silverton
- Lottie Briscoe as Gertie Farish
- Pauline Welsh as Nettie Struthers
- Maggie Western as Mrs. Haffen
- Nellie Parker Spaulding as Mrs. Penniston
- Sidney Bracy as Percy Gryce
- Kempton Greene as Jeff Wade
- Morgan Jones as Butler

== Reception ==
The House of Mirth received much acclaim, especially for its characters and scene arrangement. Margaret I. MacDonald acclaimed in her review that the novel "makes an attractive basis for a screen production" and has been skillfully adapted by Director Albert Capellani and screenwriter June Mathis, with Katherine Harris Barrymore as the star, while the director "without unduly accentuating unpleasant situations ... has succeeded well in turning the finer points of the story to account, and Katherine Harris Barrymore has given a splendid portrayal of a character which, regardless of its human tendency to err. upholds the dignity of moral womanhood."

The Film Daily reviewed that the director Albert Capellani "is certainly deserving of much credit for the intelligent way he has handled this offering. Despite the unusual number of complications and the large cast involved, he has made the production understandable and interesting all the way, at the same time maintaining the suspense and giving us many good individual touches throughout. They had a great cast in this, and although the names may not be a real box office asset to theatres outside of New York, every role bore the unmistakable touch of an artist and Metro is justified in terming this an all-star cast."

Like many American films of the time, The House of Mirth was subject to restrictions and cuts by city and state film censorship boards. For example, the Chicago Board of Censors required cuts, in Reel 1, of the woman in silhouette behind veil, Reel 3, the intertitle "You know how you can repay me", Reel 4, the two intertitles "You're willing enough to take favors" etc. and "Now I want value received", and, Reel 6, the two intertitles "Now that society has accepted me, of course, I cannot marry you" and "If you only will be sensible".

Some criticisms, nevertheless, still existed. The Motion Picture News pointed that " The allegory at the beginning and the end of the picture showing an old man weighing virtue with gold, with a human skull on the table, is not very pleasant. It adds very little to the dramatic values and subtracts manyfold from the entertaining. Such scenes have no popular appeal." However, these criticisms were never able to devalue the film.
