= His Friend's Wife =

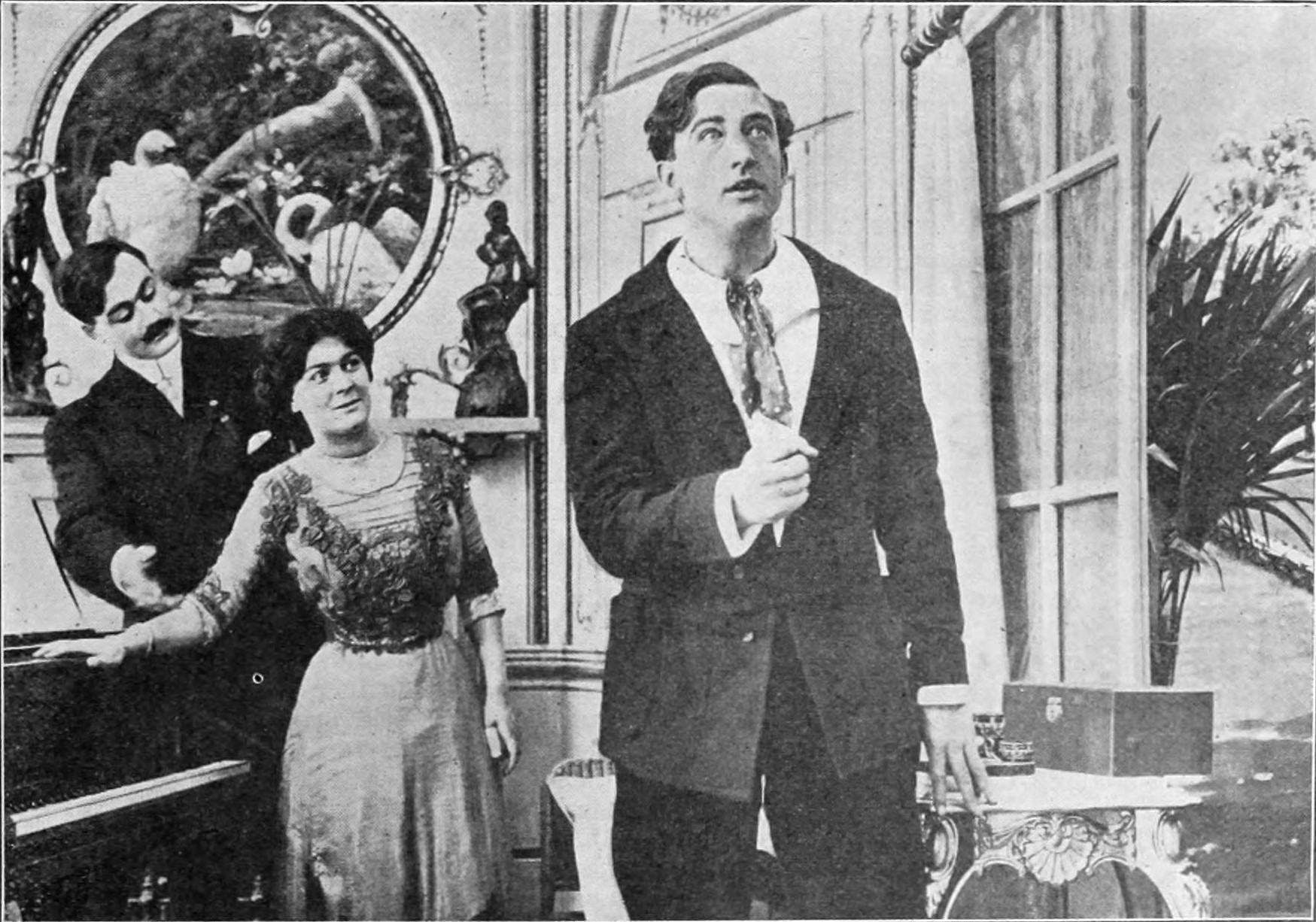
- Scene from the film
- Directed by: Harry McRae Webster
- Starring: Francis X. Bushman; Lottie Briscoe; Dorothy Phillips
- Production company: Essanay Film
- Distributed by: General Film Company
- Release date: June 6, 1911
- Country: United States
- Languages: Silent film English intertitles

His Friend's Wife is a 1911 American short silent romantic drama starring Lottie Briscoe and Dorothy Phillips, directed by Harry McRae Webster. It is the film debut of Francis X. Bushman.

== Plot ==
Jean, an artist of the Latin Quarter of Paris, tires of Mimi, his model, and although she implores him to let her remain with him, he orders her out of his studio. Shortly after Jean is visited by Bert Rainey, a young American art student in Paris, who has returned from America to continue his studies. Bert suggests that they visit the old landmark which suits Jean, who desires to look for another model. The two part at a café and Jean enters and seats himself at a table and ordering wine, studies the faces of the men and women about him. A moment later Zenia, a beautiful flower girl, carrying her wares, enters. Jean questions her and is struck by her beauty. He suggests that she come and pose for him. A few months elapse and Jean tires of his little flower girl and makes clear to her that he desires another model, Heartbroken, the girl vainly implores Jean to keep her and finally runs from the room while Jean looks after her smiling.

Six months later Jean receives a letter from his old friend Bert, requesting him to visit him. Jean enters Bert's home, and to his amazement finds that Zenia is now the wife of his old friend. Left alone with the artist, Zenia begs Jean not to tell of their former relations, and after a struggle Jean resolves to leave without telling the secret. Later Zenia and her husband, visiting the artist, find him dead in the studio, an empty wine bottle at his elbow. Seeing that her secret is buried forever, Zenia goes to her husband's arms and finds a welcome there.

== Cast ==
- Francis X. Bushman as Jean
- Lottie Briscoe as Zenia
- Dorothy Phillips

== See also ==
- Francis X. Bushman filmography
