= Your Friend and Mine =

1923 film by Clarence G. Badger

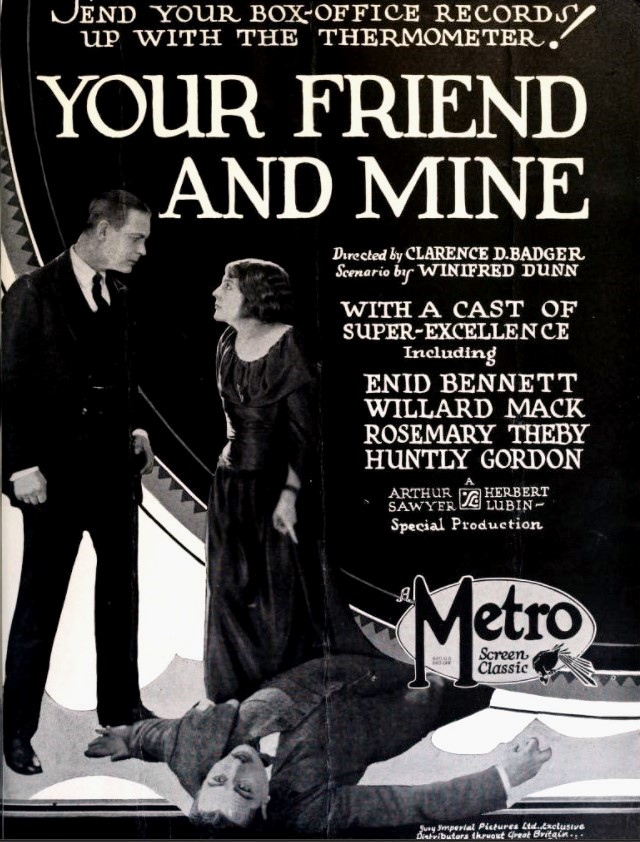
- Advertisement
- Directed by: Clarence G. Badger
- Written by: Winifred Dunn
- Based on: Your Friend and Mine by Willard Mack
- Produced by: Bert Lubin; Arthur H. Sawyer
- Starring: Enid Bennett; Huntley Gordon; Willard Mack
- Cinematography: Rudolph J. Bergquist
- Production company: Sawyer-Lubin Pictures Corporation
- Distributed by: Metro Pictures
- Release date: March 5, 1923
- Running time: 6 reels
- Country: United States
- Language: Silent (English intertitles)

Your Friend and Mine is a 1923 American silent drama film directed by Clarence G. Badger and starring Enid Bennett, Huntley Gordon, and Willard Mack. It is based upon the play of the same name by Mack and adapted for the screen by Winifred Dunn.

== Cast ==
- Enid Bennett as Patricia Stanton
- Huntley Gordon as Hugh Stanton
- Willard Mack as Ted Mason
- Rosemary Theby as Mrs. Beatrice Mason
- J. Herbert Frank as Victor Reymier
- Otto Lederer as Andrea Mertens
- Allene Ray as Marie Mertens

== Preservation ==
Your Friend and Mine is currently presumed lost. In February of 2021, the film was cited by the National Film Preservation Board on their Lost U.S. Silent Feature Films list.

== Bibliography ==
- Goble, Alan. The Complete Index to Literary Sources in Film. Walter de Gruyter, 1999.
