= Julanne Johnston =

American actress (1900–1988)

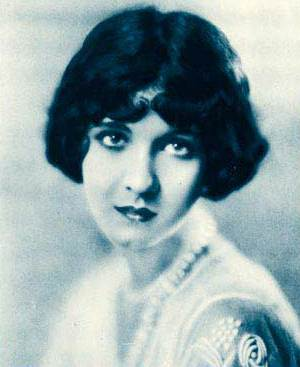
- Publicity photo from Stars of the Photoplay (1924)
- Born: May 1, 1900; Indianapolis, Indiana, U.S.
- Died: December 26, 1988 (aged 88); Grosse Pointe, Michigan, U.S.
- Resting place: Woodlawn Cemetery
- Occupation: Actress
- Years active: 1917–1934
- Spouse: David W. Rust
- Children: 1

Several scenes of Julanne Johnston in The Thief of Bagdad

Julanne Johnston (May 1, 1900 – December 26, 1988) was an American silent film actress.

== Biography ==
Johnston was born and educated in Indianapolis, Indiana; then her family moved to Hollywood, where she took dancing lessons at the Denishawn School and acted with Neely Dickson's Hollywood Community Theatre for two years. She also attended the Hollywood School for Girls.

Johnston began her career as a solo dancer and toured with Ruth St. Denis during summer vacations from school. In 1924, she was selected to be a WAMPAS Baby Star.

Douglas Fairbanks saw Johnston dance in a theater before the premiere of his film Robin Hood, and this exposure resulted in his signing her to be the leading lady in The Thief of Bagdad, with Anna May Wong in 1924. The same year, she was on William Randolph Hearst's yacht the Oneida during the weekend in November 1924 when film director and producer Thomas Ince later died of apparent heart failure (many conspiracy theories exist about Ince's death).

Johnston retired from acting in 1934.

== Personal life ==
Johnston married David W. Rust, and they lived in Detroit, Michigan. They had one child, David Wendell Rust. Johnston lost her 62-year-old husband and her 29-year-old son within the space of six years.

She died in Grosse Pointe, Michigan, at the age of 88. Her remains were buried at Woodlawn Cemetery in Detroit.

== Partial filmography ==
- Youth (1917, uncredited)
- Better Times (1919)
- Miss Hobbs (1920) - Millicent Farey
- Fickle Women (1920) - Janie Cullison
- Seeing It Through (1920) - Janice Wilson
- The Young Rajah (1922) - Dancing Girl (uncredited)
- Madness of Youth (1923) - The Dancer
- The Brass Bottle (1923)
- Tea: With a Kick! (1923) - Gwen Van Peebles
- The Thief of Bagdad (1924) - The Princess
- Garragan (1924)
- The City of Temptation (1925) - Wanda Menkoff
- Big Pal (1925) - Helen Truscott
- The Big Parade (1925) - Justine Devereux (uncredited)
- The Prude's Fall (1925) - Sonia Roubetsky
- Captain Fearless (1925)
- Pleasures of the Rich (1926) - Phyliss Worthing
- Aloma of the South Seas (1926) - Sylvia
- Dame Chance (1926) - Gail Vernon
- Twinkletoes (1926) - Lilac
- Venus of Venice (1927) - Jean
- Die selige Exzellenz (1927) - Vanda Mekoff
- Good Time Charley (1927) - Elaine Keene
- Her Wild Oat (1927) - Miss Whitley
- The Whip Woman (1928) - Mme. Haldane
- Name the Woman (1928) - Nina Palmer
- The Olympic Hero (1928) - Mary Brown
- Oh, Kay! (1928) - Constance Appleton
- Synthetic Sin (1929) - Member of Frank's Gang #5
- The Younger Generation (1929) - Irma Striker (uncredited)
- Prisoners (1929) - Lenke
- Smiling Irish Eyes (1929) - Goldie Devore
- The Show of Shows (1929) - Performer in 'Ladies of the Ensemble' Number
- General Crack (1929) - Court Lady
- Strictly Modern (1930) - Aimee Spencer
- Golden Dawn (1930) - Sister Hedwig
- Madam Satan (1930) - Miss Conning Tower
- Stepping Sisters (1932) - Minor Role (uncredited)
- Midnight Club (1933, uncredited)
- Morning Glory (1933, uncredited)
- Bolero (1934, uncredited)
- The Scarlet Empress (1934) - Catherine's Lady-in-Waiting (uncredited)
- Cleopatra (1934, uncredited)
