= Twenty Dollars a Week =

1924 film

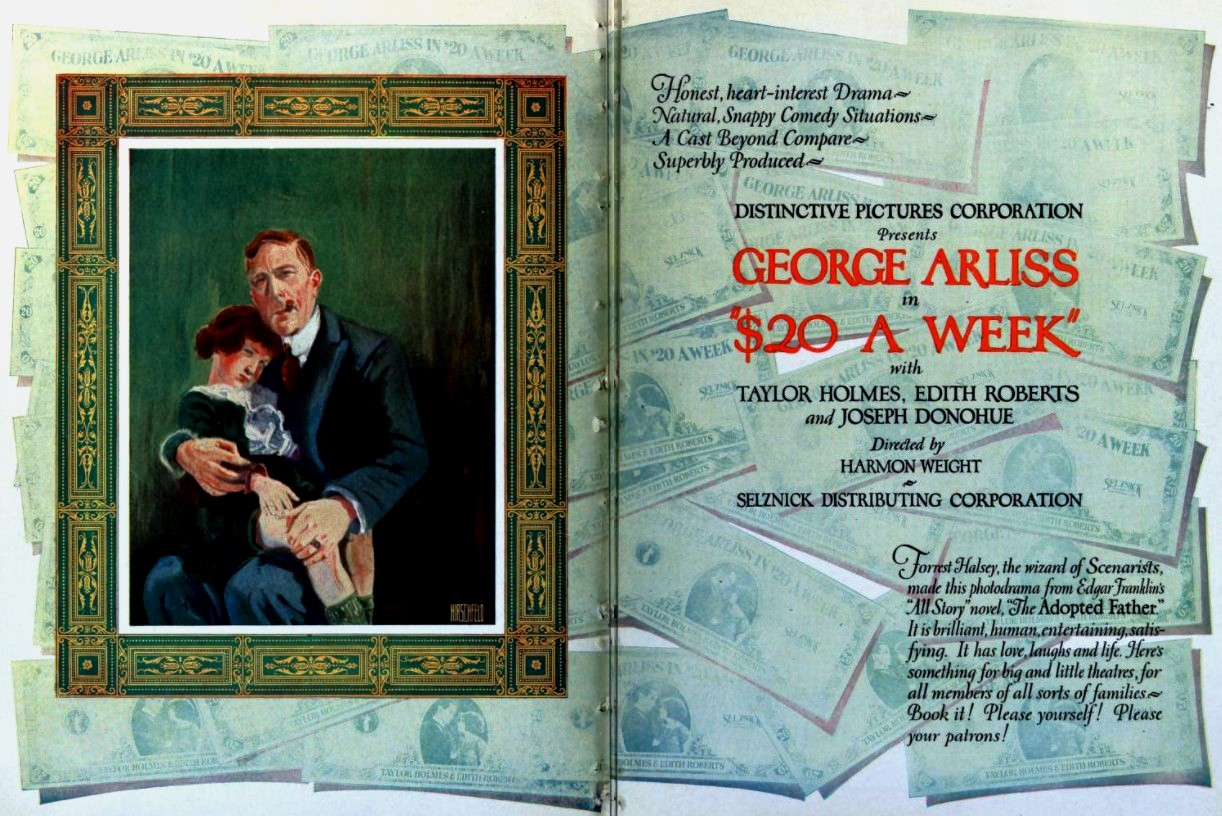
- Advertisement
- Directed by: F. Harmon Weight
- Written by: Forrest Halsey
- Starring: George Arliss; Taylor Holmes; Edith Roberts; Ronald Colman
- Cinematography: Harry Fischbeck(fr)
- Production company: Distinctive Pictures
- Distributed by: Selznick Distributing Corporation
- Release date: April 12, 1924
- Running time: 6 reels
- Country: United States
- Language: Silent (English intertitles)

Twenty Dollars a Week is a 1924 American silent comedy drama film directed by F. Harmon Weight and starring George Arliss, Taylor Holmes, and Edith Roberts. Ronald Colman, then a rising star, had a supporting role as Arliss's character's son. The film was long thought lost before a print was rediscovered in the Library of Congress collection.

The British title was The Man Maker. In 1933, Arliss starred in a talkie remake, The Working Man, co-starring a young Bette Davis.

== Plot ==
As described in a film magazine review, John Reeves, steel magnate, wagers with his son Chester that he can earn twenty dollars a week and live on it. He procures work in the office of William Hart's steel plant. Against her brother's wish, Hart's sister Muriel adopts a little boy. Hart evens up by adopting John Reeves as his father. Reeves foils James Pettison's plot to ruin Hart. Chester also makes good as a workman and wins the affection of Hart's sister. The father reveals his identity and takes Hart as a partner.

== Cast ==
- George Arliss as John Reeves
- Taylor Holmes as William Hart
- Edith Roberts as Muriel Hart
- Wallie Howe as Henry Sloane
- Redfield Clarke as George Blair
- Ronald Colman as Chester Reeves
- Ivan F. Simpson as James Pettison (credited as Ivan Sampson)
- Joseph Donohue as Little Arthur
- William Sellery as Clancy, Restaurateur
- George Henry as Butler

== Preservation ==
Prints of Twenty Dollars a Week are located in the Library of Congress and Ngā Taonga Sound & Vision (New Zealand Film Archive).

== Bibliography ==
- Goble, Alan. The Complete Index to Literary Sources in Film. Walter de Gruyter, 1999. ISBN 9783598114922
