= F. Harmon Weight =

American film director

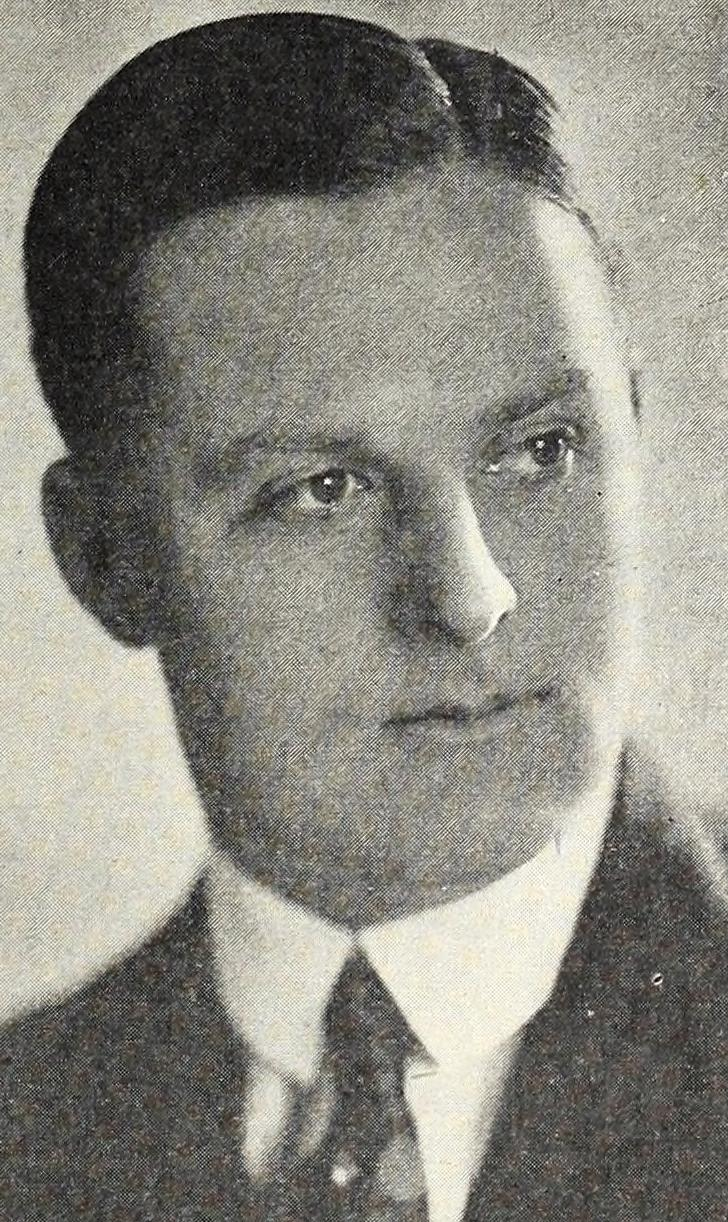
- Weight c. 1926
- Born: Frederick Harmon Weight; July 1, 1887; Salt Lake City, Utah
- Died: August 12, 1978 (aged 91); Los Angeles County, California
- Resting place: Forest Lawn Memorial Park (Hollywood Hills) Los Angeles, California
- Other name: Harmon Weight
- Occupation: movie director
- Children: 2

Frederick Harmon Weight (July 1, 1887 – August 12, 1978) was an American film director most prolific in the late silent film era of the 1920s. He directed many well-known performers such as George Arliss, Betty Compson, Myrna Loy and Rin-Tin-Tin.

He was born in Salt Lake City, Utah and began his career in the theater. He was the assistant director on 1916 film The Corner.

== Selected filmography ==
- The Corner (1916), assistant director
- The Ruling Passion (1922)
- The Man Who Played God (1922)
- The Ragged Edge (1923)
- Ramshackle House (1924)
- On the Stroke of Three (1924)
- Twenty Dollars a Week (1924)
- Drusilla with a Million (1925)
- Three of a Kind (1925), also released as Three Wise Crooks
- Flaming Waters (1925)
- A Poor Girl's Romance (1926)
- Forever After (1926)
- Hook and Ladder No. 9 (1927)
- Midnight Madness (1928), produced by Cecil B. DeMille
- Jazz Mad (1928)
- Hardboiled Rose (1929)
- Frozen River (1929)
