= Together We Live =

1935 film

- Directed by: Willard Mack
- Written by: Willard Mack
- Produced by: Bryan Foy
- Starring: Willard Mack; Ben Lyon; Sheila Bromley; William Bakewell
- Cinematography: Roy Overbaugh
- Edited by: Arthur Hilton
- Production company: Foy Productions
- Distributed by: Columbia Pictures
- Release date: August 16, 1935
- Running time: 70 minutes
- Country: United States
- Language: English

Together We Live is a 1935 drama film distributed by Columbia Pictures. The film was directed by Willard Mack. The film's events are related to the 1934 West Coast waterfront strike. Two starring actors were dead at the time of release which led to them receiving lower billing, including Mack who directed the film.

== Plot ==
Hank Kavanaugh is a civil war veteran with five children. His sons Max and George are often absent from family meetings held after dinner. When Kavanaugh reads about the San Francisco strike by communists, he voices his distaste for communism while Max and George state that communism has virtues. They then reveal that they were at communist meetings during the family meetings. Kavanaugh has to contend with changing the views of his sons while also dealing with the communist-led strike that Max is involved with.

== Cast ==
From the American Film Institute.

- Willard Mack as Hank Kavanaugh
- Ben Lyon as Max Kavanaugh
- Esther Ralston as Jenny Kavanaugh
- Sheila Bromley as Mary Kavanaugh
- Carlyle Moore Jr. as Arthur Kavanaugh
- Hobart Bosworth as Colonel Dickinson
- Wera Engels as Sonia
- Charles Sabin as George Kavanaugh
- William Bakewell as Billy Graham
- Claude Gillingwater as Dick
- William V. Mong as Johnny
- Richard Carle as Charlie
- Lou Tellegen as Bischofsky

== Production and release ==
The film's working titles were Call to Arms and The Soldier Story. In December 1935, the film was banned from releasing in Great Britain although the reason is unknown. It was produced during the 1934 West Coast waterfront strike in San Francisco, California. Joseph Breen, the director of the Production Code Administration, certified the film once changes were made including "the removal of any direct attacks on organized labor, capitalism, or constituted forces of law and order". The changes were meant "to specify that the strike was the work of outside agitators".

While the film was being produced at a Columbia Pictures studio, Wera Engels took a saw out of a package which caused the carpenters there to proclaim, "She can't do that to us – she's not in the union!" Actor Ben Lyon calmed the carpenters down by explaining that Engels "was an experienced musical saw operator", leading to the majority of the studio's carpenters trying to produce music using their saws.

Actors Willard Mack and Lou Tellegen were dead by the time of release which led to both actors not receiving top billing. Tellegen died by suicide. The film was held back from an earlier release due to trade reasons.

== Critical reception ==
Variety wrote that the film appeared to have produced "in a hurried effort to cash in on the high feeling on the west coast after the San Francisco general strike." It continued to write, "Picture has plenty of slaps at communism, some of it not too subtle, all in the cause of better Americanism." Of the performances, Variety commented that "the only outstanding thespian contribution is by Mack", Engels "does well enough" and the rest of the cast is "just so-so."

The South Bend Tribune praised Willard Mack's role of Kavanaugh, saying that "Mack's characterization is a part of the story" and that his role was of "a lovable old man very convincing in his talk against his son's new ideas".

The Wisconsin State Journal wrote that films such as Red Salute and this film are propaganda and that "they may be exceedingly dangerous, for there is no counteracting propaganda". The article continued to say that the film is "nationalistic" and "fascist".
