= The Corner (1916 film) =

1916 film

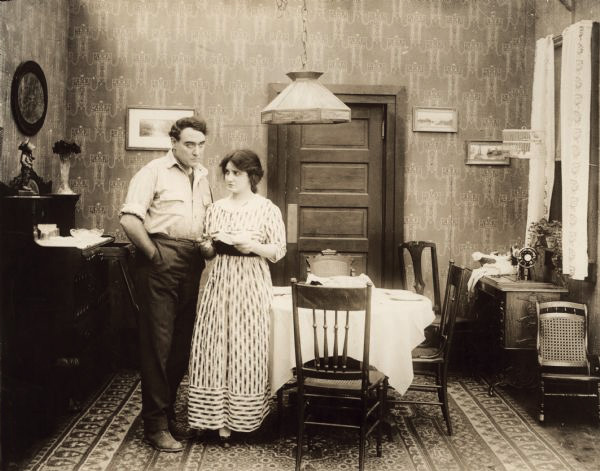
- Film still with Mack and Williams
- Directed by: Walter Edwards; F. Harmon Weight(assistant)
- Written by: C. Gardner Sullivan
- Produced by: Thomas H. Ince
- Starring: George Fawcett; Willard Mack; Clara Williams
- Cinematography: Otis M. Gove; Dev Jennings
- Production company: Kay-Bee Pictures
- Distributed by: Triangle Film
- Release date: January 1916
- Running time: 50 minutes
- Country: United States
- Languages: Silent; English intertitles

The Corner is a lost 1916 film western written by C. Gardner Sullivan and starring George Fawcett and Willard Mack. One of the extras is then unknown John Gilbert.

== Cast ==
- George Fawcett as David Waltham
- Willard Mack as John Adams
- Clara Williams as Mrs. Adams
- Louise Brownell as Mrs. Waltham
- Charles F. Miller as Rent Collector
- John Gilbert as Extra (uncredited)
- Thelma Salter as Little Girl (uncredited)
