= Pleasures of the Rich =

1926 lost film by Louis J. Gasnier

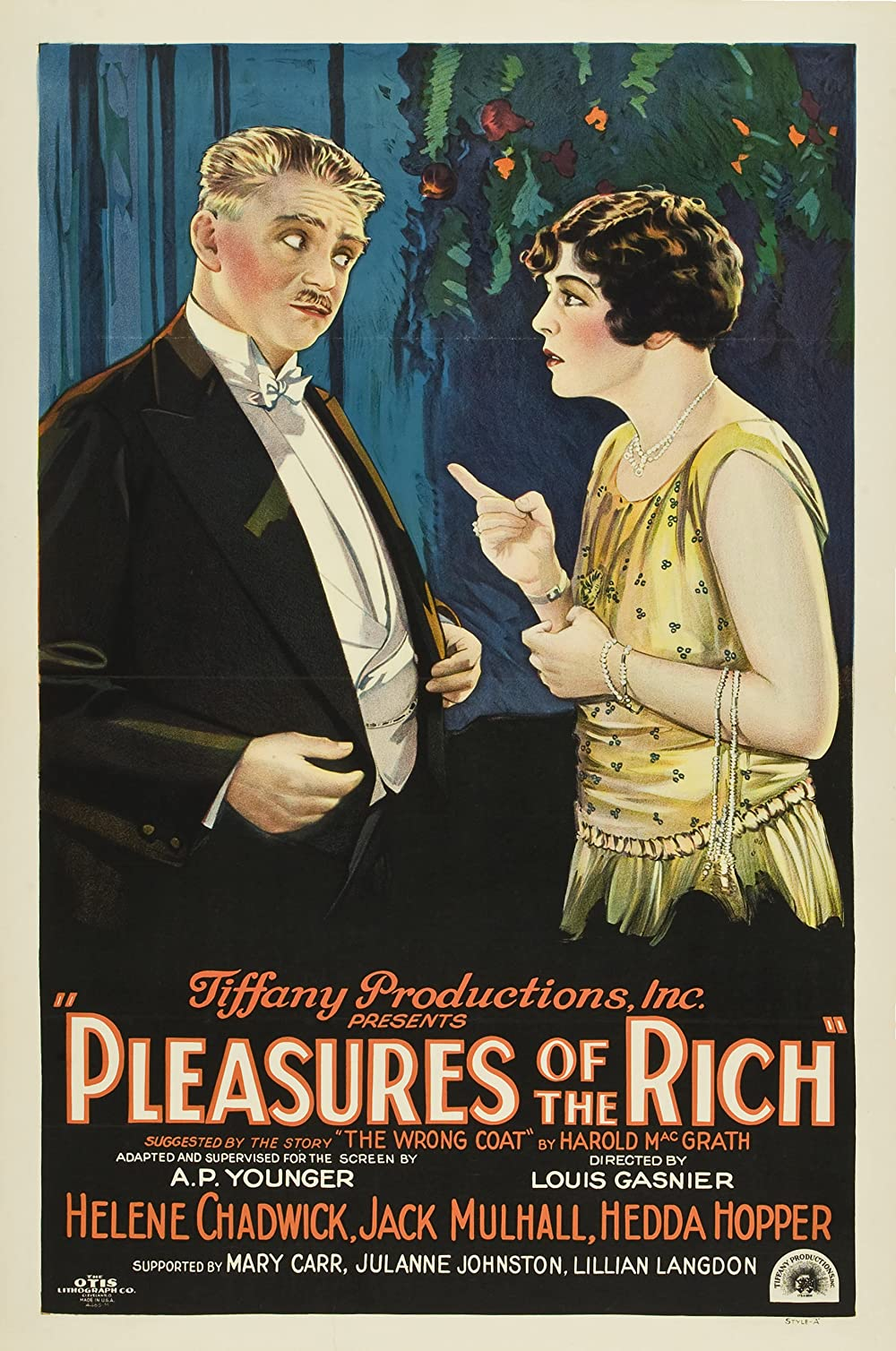
- Pleasures of the Rich theatrical poster
- Directed by: Louis J. Gasnier
- Written by: A. P. Younger (scenario)
- Story by: Harold McGrath ("The Wrong Coat")
- Produced by: A. P. Younger (supervising)
- Starring: Helene Chadwick; Jack Mulhall; Hedda Hopper
- Production company: Tiffany Productions
- Distributed by: Renown Pictures; Midwest Film Distributors
- Release date: February 1926
- Running time: 70 minutes
- Country: United States
- Language: Silent (English intertitles)

Pleasures of the Rich is a 1926 American silent romantic drama film directed by Louis J. Gasnier and produced by Tiffany Pictures with a general distribution through Renown Pictures. The film featured several well known performers of the time, such as Helene Chadwick, Jack Mulhall, Hedda Hopper, and Mary Carr.

== Plot ==
As described in a film magazine review, Henry Wilson, head of a grocery chain and a married man, suddenly becomes interested in Mona Vincent, a divorcee. Mona, wishing to have her own sugar daddy, also is trying to land Frank Clayton, a scion of wealth, with whom Wilson's daughter Mary is in love. Mona promises the daughter to give the father up if the daughter will give her Clayton. The daughter agrees and then tries to drown herself. After he tells his wife that he is leaving her for another woman, Henry Wilson learns that Mona is making a "boob" of him and hurries back to his wife. Mary is rescued and weds Clayton.

== Cast ==
- Helene Chadwick as Mary Wilson
- Jack Mulhall as Frank Clayton
- Hedda Hopper as Mona Vincent
- Mary Carr as Kate Wilson
- Marcin Asher as Henry 'Pushcart' Wilson
- Lillian Langdon as Mrs. Clayton
- Dorothea Wolbert as Maggie the Maid
- Julanne Johnston as Phylliss Worthing
- Katherine Scott as Mrs. Worthing

== Preservation ==
With no prints of Pleasures of the Rich locatedin any film archives, it is a lost film. Its trailer still exists and is housed at the Library of Congress.
