= Daniel Nathan Rubin =

American dramatist (1892–1965)

Daniel Nathan Rubin (August 4, 1892 – January 31, 1965) was an American playwright. Several of his plays were adapted into films, for which he wrote the screenplays.

Rubin was born into a Jewish family in Charleston, South Carolina, the son of Hyman Levin Rubin and Frances "Fanny" Sanders. His father was a merchant who emigrated from the Russian Empire. He worked as a newspaper writer.

His play "The Lion Trap" was adapted into the 1928 film Midnight Madness. He cowrote the screenplay for the 1931 film Dishonored and adapted O. Henry's short story "The Double-Dyed Deceiver" into the screenplay for The Texan (film) (1930). His play "Riddle Me This" was adapted to film as Guilty as Hell in 1932.

== Plays ==
Plays he wrote include:

- "The Boomerang" (1914)
- "The Upheaval" (1922)
- "Claire Adams" (1929)
- "Move On, Sister" (1933)
- "Devils" (1926)
- "Riddle Me This" (1932 and 1933)
- "The Night Duel" (1926)
- "The Lion Trap"
- "Women Go On Forever" (1927)
- "Night Club Scandal" adapted into the 1937 film
- "Year of Delight" (1957)
- "Desire on the Upas Tree Blooming" (1964)
