= Dame Chance =

1926 film

- Directed by: Bertram Bracken
- Written by: Frances Nordstrom (story-adaptation)
- Produced by: David Hartford
- Starring: Julanne Johnston; Robert Frazer; Gertrude Astor
- Cinematography: Walter L. Griffin
- Distributed by: American Cinema Associates
- Release date: September 23, 1926
- Running time: 70 minutes; 7 reels (6,769 feet)
- Country: United States
- Language: Silent (English intertitles)

Dame Chance is a surviving 1926 American silent romantic drama film produced and released by independent companies David Hartford Productions and American Cinema Associates respectively. The stars are Julanne Johnston, Robert Frazer, Gertrude Astor, and Mary Carr. Copies of the film are held at the Library of Congress and the BFI British Film Institute.

== Cast ==
- Julanne Johnston as Gail Vernon
- Gertrude Astor as Nina Carrington
- Robert Frazer as Lloyd Mason
- David Hartford as Craig Stafford
- Lincoln Stedman as Bunny Dean
- Mary Carr as Mrs. Vernon
- John T. Prince as Sims
