= Forever After (film) =

1926 film

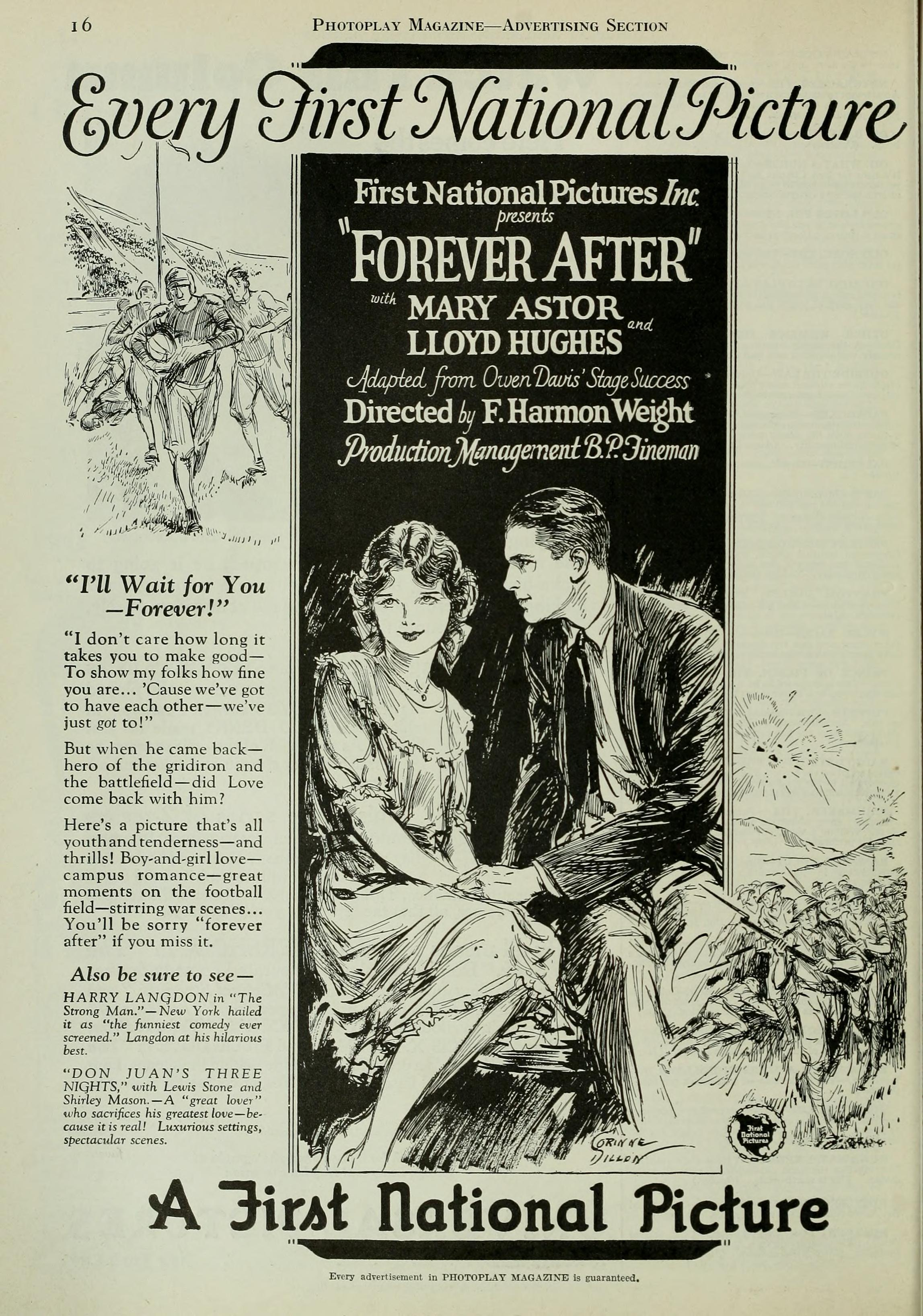
- An ad for the film in the November 1926 edition of Photoplay
- Directed by: F. Harmon Weight
- Written by: Julien Josephson; Paul Gangelin
- Starring: Lloyd Hughes; Mary Astor; Hallam Cooley
- Cinematography: Karl Struss
- Production company: First National Pictures
- Distributed by: First National Pictures
- Release date: October 17, 1926
- Running time: 69 minutes
- Country: United States
- Language: Silent (English intertitles)

Forever After is a 1926 American silent drama film directed by F. Harmon Weight and starring Lloyd Hughes, Mary Astor, and Hallam Cooley.

== Cast ==
- Lloyd Hughes as Theodore Wayne
- Mary Astor as Jennie Clayton
- Hallam Cooley as Jack Randall
- David Torrence as Mr. Clayton, Jennie's Father
- Eulalie Jensen as Mrs. Clayton
- Alec B. Francis as Mr. Wayne, Theodore's Father
- Lila Leslie as Mrs. Wayne

== Preservation ==
A print of Forever After is in the BFI National Archive.

== Bibliography ==
- Munden, Kenneth White. The American Film Institute Catalog of Motion Pictures Produced in the United States, Part 1. University of California Press, 1997.
