= Big Pal =

1925 film

- Directed by: John G. Adolfi
- Written by: Jules Furthman
- Produced by: William Russell
- Starring: William Russell; Julanne Johnston; Mary Carr
- Production company: William Russell Productions
- Distributed by: Henry Ginsberg Distributing Company; Wardour Films (UK)
- Release date: September 1925
- Running time: 50 minutes
- Country: United States
- Language: Silent (English intertitles)

Big Pal is a 1925 American silent sports drama film directed by John G. Adolfi and starring William Russell, Julanne Johnston and Mary Carr. It was released in Britain in 1926, distributed by Wardour Films.

== Plot ==
Big Pal (1925)

As described in a film magazine review, Judge Truscott's daughter Helen spurns his wealthy lifestyle and goes to do social work in poorer neighborhoods. She is saved from a runaway horse accident by Dan Williams, champion pugilist, and a warm friendship develops between them. On the eve of a championship battle, Dan's favorite nephew, little Johnny, is abducted by criminals, and Dan is notified that unless he quits during the fifth round of the boxing match, the lad's life will be sacrificed. He decides to lose, but, as the fifth round approaches, Helen appears ringside along with Johnny, who had escaped his abductors. Dan cuts loose, winning the match and the affections of Helen.

== Cast ==
- William Russell as Dan Williams
- Julanne Johnston as Helen Truscott
- Mary Carr as Mary Williams
- Mickey Bennett as Johnny Williams
- Hayden Stevenson as Tim Williams
- Henry A. Barrows as Judge Truscott
- Frank Hagney as Bill Hogan
- William Bailey as Undetermined Secondary Role (uncredited)
- Buck Black as One of the Kids (uncredited)
- Alison Skipworth as Agatha Briggs, truant officer (uncredited)

== Preservation ==
A restored copy of Big Pal exists at the Library of Congress.

== Bibliography ==
- Munden, Kenneth White. The American Film Institute Catalog of Motion Pictures Produced in the United States, Part 1. University of California Press, 1997.
