= On the Stroke of Three =

1924 silent film

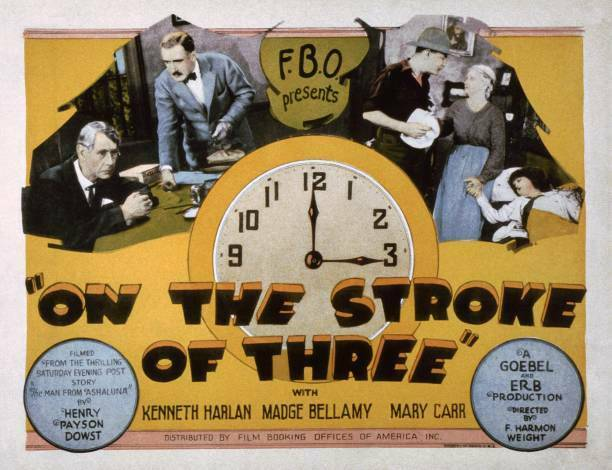
- Directed by: F. Harmon Weight
- Written by: O.E. Goebel; Philip Lonergan
- Based on: The Man from Ashaluna by Henry Payson Dowst
- Starring: Kenneth Harlan; Madge Bellamy; Mary Carr
- Cinematography: Victor Milner; Paul P. Perry
- Production company: Associated Arts Corporation
- Distributed by: Film Booking Offices of America
- Release date: October 30, 1924
- Running time: 70 minutes
- Country: United States
- Language: Silent (English intertitles)

On the Stroke of Three is a 1924 American silent drama film directed by F. Harmon Weight and starring Kenneth Harlan, Madge Bellamy, and Mary Carr.

== Plot ==
As described in a review in a film magazine, Lafayette Jordan (Davis), financier, plans to inundate Caribou Canyon and turn it into a reservoir, but the villagers will not sell him their land. Among the resentful villagers is Judson Forrest (Harlan), who wants to be an inventor. Mary Jordan (Bellamy), daughter of the financier, is hurt and spends a night at his home. Learning of his attitude toward her father, she poses as a domestic at the Jordan home. Later, in New York, Judson looks her up. He is trying to sell his invention and, to get funds, he mortgages his home. The village banker, in league with Jordan, sells the financier the mortgage, and a foreclosure threatens when Jordan's business agent Henry Mogridge (Miljan) double-crosses Judson. The youth thinks Mary working against him. Friends come to Judson's aid and he pays off the mortgage in the nick of time. He learns that Jordan knew nothing of the methods employed by his agent and that Mary loves him.

== Cast ==
- Kenneth Harlan as Judson Forrest
- Madge Bellamy as Mary Jordan
- Mary Carr as 'Ma' Forrest
- John Miljan as Henry Mogridge
- Robert Dudley as Jasper Saddler
- Leonore Matre as Lillian Haskins
- Edwards Davis as Lafayette Jordan
- Eddie Phillips as Austin Dudley
- Dorothy Dahmas Emily Jordan

== Preservation ==
With no prints of On the Stroke of Three located in any film archives, it is a lost film.

== Bibliography ==
- Munden, Kenneth White. The American Film Institute Catalog of Motion Pictures Produced in the United States, Part 1. University of California Press, 1997.
