= The Olympic Hero =

1928 film

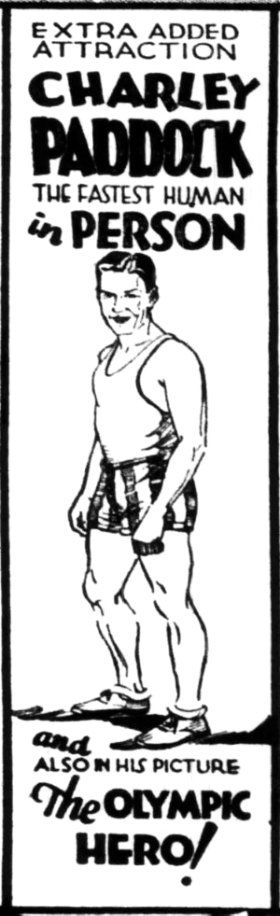
- Directed by: Roy William Neill
- Written by: Ronald De Gastro; Walter Weems
- Starring: Charley Paddock; Julanne Johnston; Crauford Kent
- Cinematography: Faxon M. Dean
- Edited by: Henry Weber
- Production company: James P. Lyons
- Distributed by: Zakoro Film Corporation
- Release dates: April 21, 1928 (/ personal appearance): June 15, 1928; (w/o)
- Running time: 30 minutes (w/ personal appearance); 60 minutes (w/o)
- Country: United States
- Languages: Silent; English intertitles

The Olympic Hero is a 1928 American silent comedy sports film directed by Roy William Neill and starring Olympic sprint champion Charles Paddock, Julanne Johnston and Crauford Kent.

== Cast ==
- Charley Paddock as Charlie Patterson
- Julanne Johnston as Mary Brown
- Donald Stuart as Assistant Coach
- Harvey Clark as Coach Regan
- Crauford Kent as Man-About-Town
- Jack Selwyn as Harold Fellows
- Emile Chautard as Grandpa Brown
- R.O. Pennell as Professor
- Aileen Manning as Physical Instructress
- Bob Maxwell as Balfor Champ
- Raoul Paoli as French Champ

== Plot ==
Charlie Patterson (Paddock) is a "gas station employee who rises to 'Olympian' heights. ... In the fadeout he gets the coveted world’s championship and the girl [Johnston], whose presence and inspiration is the background of the simple little story." Variety noted that the film had "little or no story, and the comedy sequences, used to pad, are of the old Sennett vintage."

== Notes ==
The original title, when the production was announced, was The All-American. The mission of the film was to “to glorify the American boy.”

The film's release was timed to exploit interest in the 1928 Summer Olympics (July 28–August 12). The film incorporated newsreel shots of the 1924 games.

On July 8, 1928, the same day that Paddock was named to the Olympic team, he was charged with professionalism for his role in making and marketing The Olympic Hero, based on the presumption that he had been paid for both acting in the film and making personal appearances which began in late April. General Douglas MacArthur, head of the Olympic team, referred the matter to the registration committee of the Amateur Athletic Union. Since the team was set to sail on the SS President Roosevelt on July 10, adjudicating the case was an emergency. Paddock presented affidavits from Franklin M. Baldwin, producer, and Nicholas Schenck, exhibitor, that he had not been remunerated, and his amateur status was affirmed.

At some big-city exhibitions, a 30-minute version of the film was shown, accompanied by a tribute from famed sportswriter Grantland Rice, after which Paddock spoke to the audience in person. A Billboard review noted "his excellently delivered talk, in which he relates several pointed anecdotes and tells about his career in restrained but convincing rhetoric." However, they criticized his acting in the film as "just about passable." Variety reviewed a 60-minute version, absent Paddock's presence. Their September comments followed "Paddock’s bad showing in the games" (he failed to make the 200 meter final, his only event), which they deemed should relegate the film "to [rounding] out a fair double bill."

== Bibliography ==
- Wiley Lee Umphlett. The Movies Go to College: Hollywood and the World of the College-life Film. Fairleigh Dickinson Univ Press, 1984.
