= Mary Carr =

American actress (1874–1973)

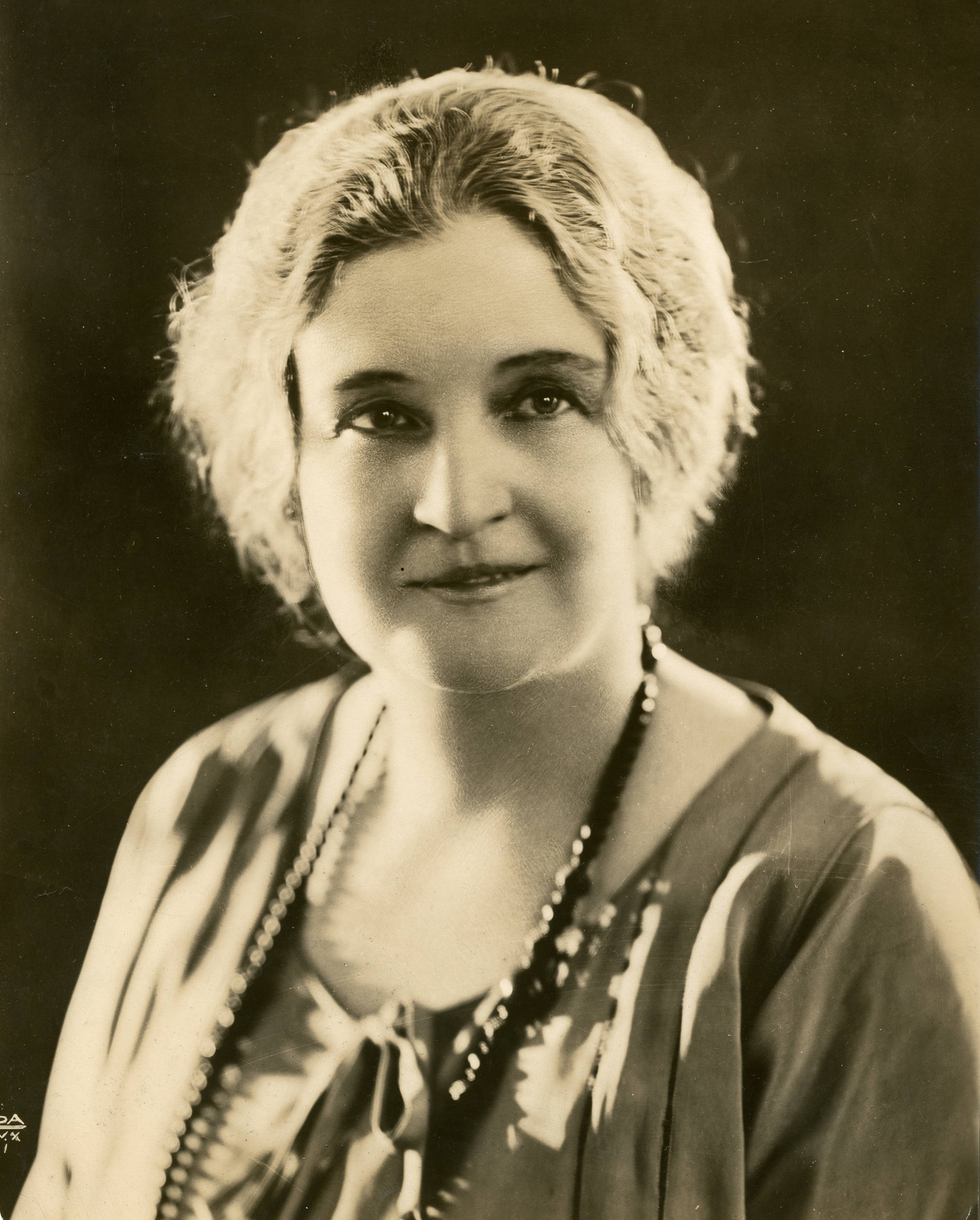
- Carr in 1923
- Born: Mary Kenevan; March 14, 1874; Germantown, Pennsylvania, U.S.
- Died: June 24, 1973 (aged 99); Woodland Hills, Los Angeles, U.S.
- Resting place: Calvary Cemetery
- Occupation: Actress
- Years active: 1915–1956
- Spouse: William Carr (1901-1926) (separated)
- Children: 7, including Thomas Carr
- Family: Pete Carpenter (son-in-law)

Mary Carr (née Kenevan; March 14, 1874 – June 24, 1973) was an American film actress, both in the silent and sound era of film. She appeared in more than 140 films from 1915 to 1956, and was given some of filmdoms plum mother roles in silent pictures, especially Fox's 1920 Over the Hill to the Poorhouse, which was a great success. Carr bore a strong resemblance to Lucy Beaumont, another famous character actress of the time who specialized in maternal roles. As older actresses such as Mary Maurice and Anna Townsend passed on, Carr, still in her forties, seemed to inherit all the matriarchal roles in silent films.

Mary Carr appeared on the June 9, 1954, episode of the radio quiz program "You Bet Your Life", hosted by comedian Groucho Marx.

She was interred in Calvary Cemetery. Carr's oldest son, William, died at age two. Almost all of her children were involved in the film business and appeared with her in Over the Hill.

== Filmography ==
=== Silent films ===
- The Shadow of Tragedy (1915, short)
- The Mirror (1915, short) as Mrs. Carr
- Blaming the Duck, or Ducking the Blame (1915, short) as Mrs. Carr
- The City of Failing Light (1916) as Mrs. William Carr, Lost
- Souls in Bondage (1916) as Mrs. Carr, Lost
- Her Bleeding Heart (1916) as Mrs. Carr, Lost
- The Flames of Johannis (1916) as Mrs. Carr, Lost
- Love's Toll (1916) as Mrs. Carr, Lost
- The Light at Dusk (1916) as Mary Kennevan Carr, Lost
- The Barrier (1917) as Mary Kennevan Carr, Lost
- The Beloved Rogue (1918), Lost (not to be confused with 1917 film Beloved Rogues)
- The Sign Invisible (1918) as Mary Kennevan Carr, Lost
- My Own United States (1918) as Mary Kennevan Carr, Lost
- To the Highest Bidder (1918), Lost
- The Birth of a Race (1918) as Mary K. Carr, Survives
- The Lion and the Mouse (1919), Lost
- Mrs. Wiggs of the Cabbage Patch (1919), Survives, in the Library of Congress
- Calibre 38 (1919) as Mary Kennevan Carr, Incomplete, Library of Congress
- The Spark Divine (1919), Lost
- Over the Hill to the Poorhouse (1920), Survives
- Thunderclap (1921), Lost
- Silver Wings (1922), Lost
- The Custard Cup (1923), Lost
- You Are Guilty (1923), Survives, may be the LOC Kodascope abridged version
- Loyal Lives (1923), Survives, incomplete or abridged
- The Daring Years (1923), Lost
- On the Banks of the Wabash (1923) (abridged version Survives; private collector)
- Broadway Broke (1923), Lost
- Three O'Clock in the Morning (1923), Lost
- Roulette (1924), Lost
- Painted People (1924), Lost
- Damaged Hearts (1924), Lost
- Why Men Leave Home (1924), Survives, MGM and/or George Eastman House
- The Woman on the Jury (1924), Lost
- The Spirit of the USA (1924), Survives, abridged version
- For Sale (1924), Lost
- A Self-Made Failure (1924), Lost, trailer only in the Library of Congress
- The Mine with the Iron Door (1924), Survives, Gosfilmofond and Bois d'Arcy, France
- Three Women (1924), Survives
- East of Broadway (1924), Survives, Cineteca Italiana
- On the Stroke of Three (1924), Lost
- Easy Money (1925), Survives, Library of Congress
- Capital Punishment (1925), Survives, Filmmuseum Amsterdam and UCLA Film and Television Archive
- The Parasite (1925), Survives, Library of Congress
- The Night Ship (1925), Lost
- The Re-Creation of Brian Kent (1925), Survives, Library of Congress
- School for Wives (1925), Lost
- The Wizard of Oz (1925) as Aunt Em, Survives
- Go Straight (1925), Survives, Library of Congress
- Drusilla with a Million (1925), Survives, Lobster Films, France
- A Slave of Fashion (1925), Lost
- The Fighting Cub (1925), Survives, UCLA (one reel missing)
- His Master's Voice (1925), Survives, Grapevine Video
- Big Pal (1925), Survives
- The Red Kimona (1925), Survives, Library of Congress
- Hogan's Alley (1925), Survives
- Flaming Waters (1925), Survives, Library of Congress
- The Gold Hunters (1925), Lost
- Stop, Look and Listen (1926), Lost
- Her Own Story (1926), Lost
- The King of the Turf (1926), Survives, Cinematheque Belgique, Brussels
- Pleasures of the Rich (1926), Lost, trailer in the Library of Congress
- The Night Watch (1926), Lost
- The Night Patrol (1926), Survives
- Somebody's Mother (1926), Lost
- Fourth Commandment (1926), Survives, BFI National Film & TV
- The Wise Guy (1926), Survives, National Archives of Canada
- The Hidden Way (1926), Survives, New Zealand Film Archive, Museum of Modern Art
- Frenzied Flames (1926), Survives, Cinematheque de Belgique, Cineteca Italiana
- The Midnight Message (1926), Survives, Library of Congress
- The False Alarm (1926), Lost according to IMDb
- Dame Chance (1926), Survives, Library of Congress
- Atta Boy(1926), Survives, UCLA Film and Television Archive
- Whom Shall I Marry (1926) Incomplete, BFI (missing a reel)
- The Show Girl (1927), Survives, UCLA Film and Television Archive
- Blonde or Brunette (1927), Survives, Library of Congress
- God's Great Wilderness (1927), Lost
- Paying the Price (1927) Incomplete, Library of Congress
- False Morals (1927), Survives, Library of Congress
- Special Delivery (1927), Survives, Library of Congress
- The Swell-Head (1927), Lost
- Better Days (1927), Survives, Library of Congress
- Jesse James (1927), Lost
- On Your Toes (1927), Lost
- Frenzy (1928 short)
- Dame Care (1928), Lost
- A Million for Love (1928), Lost
- Ehre deine Mutter (Honour Thy Mother) (1928)
- Love Over Night (1928), Survives, Museum of Modern Art
- Some Mother's Boy (1929) Survives, BFI National Film and Television London

=== Sound films ===
- Lights of New York (1928)
- Sailor's Holiday (1929)
- Second Wife (1930)
- Trailing Trouble (1930)
- Ladies in Love (1930)
- Hot Curves (1930)
- The Utah Kid (1930)
- Just Imagine (1930)
- Midnight Special (1930)
- Primrose Path (1931)
- Kept Husbands (1931)
- Beyond Victory (1931)
- Stout Hearts and Willing Hands (1931)
- Honeymoon Lane (1931)
- One Good Turn (1931)
- The Fighting Marshall (1931)
- The Law of the Tong (1931)
- The Fighting Fool (1932)
- Pack Up Your Troubles (1932)
- Young Blood (1932)
- Forbidden Trail (1932)
- Gun Law (1933)
- The Moonshiner's Daughter (1933 short)
- Flying Devils (1933)
- Police Call (1933)
- The Power and the Glory (1933)
- Bombshell (1933)
- Headline Shooter (1933, uncredited)
- Bedside (1934, uncredited)
- Love Past Thirty (1934)
- Change of Heart (1934)
- The Loudspeaker (1934)
- Whom the Gods Destroy (1934)
- The World Accuses (1934)
- The Silver Streak (1934)
- Fighting Lady (1935)
- Go Into Your Dance (1935, uncredited)
- Silk Hat Kid (1935, uncredited)
- I Don't Remember (1935 short)
- The Sea Fiend (1936)
- The Country Doctor (1936, uncredited)
- Gentle Julia (1936, uncredited)
- Postal Inspector (1936, uncredited)
- Rich Relations (1937)
- Music for Madame (1937, uncredited)
- West of Rainbow's End (1938)
- East Side of Heaven (1939, uncredited)
- The Shop Around the Corner (1940, uncredited)
- Manhattan Heartbeat (1940)
- Haunted House (1940)
- Model Wife (1941, uncredited)
- Eagle Squadron (1942)
- Oregon Trail (1945)
- Partners in Time (1946, uncredited)
- Friendly Persuasion (1956, uncredited)
