= The City of Temptation =

1925 film

- Directed by: Walter Niebuhr
- Written by: Philip Gibbs (novel)
- Starring: Olga Chekhova; Julanne Johnston; Adolf Klein
- Cinematography: Gaetano di Ventimiglia
- Production company: Stern-Film
- Distributed by: Landlicht-Filmverleih
- Release date: 9 April 1925
- Country: Germany
- Languages: Silent; German intertitles

The City of Temptation (German: Die Stadt der Versuchung) is a 1925 German silent drama film directed by Walter Niebuhr and starring Olga Chekhova, Julanne Johnston and Adolf Klein.

== Cast ==
- Olga Chekhova
- Julanne Johnston as Wanda Menkoff
- Adolf Klein
- Hugh Miller
- Adolf E. Licho
- Hermann Picha
- Malcolm Tod as Harry Stephenson
- Andja Zimowa

== Bibliography ==
- Grange, William. Cultural Chronicle of the Weimar Republic. Scarecrow Press, 2008.
