= Strictly Personal (film) =

1933 film by Ralph Murphy

- Directed by: Ralph Murphy
- Screenplay by: Beatrice Banyard; Willard Mack; Wilson Mizner; Casey Robinson; Robert T. Shannon
- Starring: Marjorie Rambeau; Dorothy Jordan; Eddie Quillan; Edward Ellis; Louis Calhern; Dorothy Burgess; Rollo Lloyd
- Cinematography: Milton R. Krasner
- Edited by: Joseph Kane
- Production company: Paramount Pictures
- Distributed by: Paramount Pictures
- Release date: March 17, 1933
- Running time: 71 minutes
- Country: United States
- Language: English

Strictly Personal is a 1933 American pre-Code drama film directed by Ralph Murphy, written by Beatrice Banyard, Willard Mack, Wilson Mizner, Casey Robinson and Robert T. Shannon, and starring Marjorie Rambeau, Dorothy Jordan, Eddie Quillan, Edward Ellis, Louis Calhern, Dorothy Burgess and Rollo Lloyd. It was released on March 17, 1933, by Paramount Pictures.

== Cast ==
- Marjorie Rambeau as Annie Gibson
- Dorothy Jordan as Mary
- Eddie Quillan as Andy
- Edward Ellis as Soapy Gibson
- Louis Calhern as Magruder
- Dorothy Burgess as Bessie
- Rollo Lloyd as Jerry O'Connor
- Olive Tell as Mrs. Castleman
- Hugh Herbert as Wetzel
- Thomas E. Jackson as Flynn
- DeWitt Jennings as Captain Reardon
- Jean Laverty as Hope Jennings
- Charles Sellon as Hewes
- Ben Hall as Holbrook
- Gay Seabrook as Giggles
- Harvey Clark as Biddleberry
- Helen Jerome Eddy as Mrs. Lovett
