= The Voice of the City =

1929 film

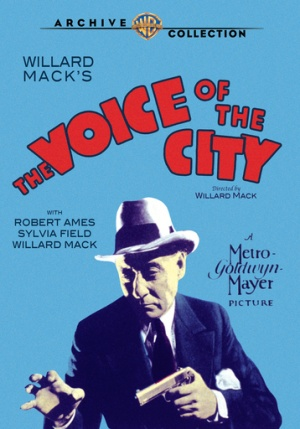
- Warner Archive DVD cover
- Directed by: Willard Mack
- Written by: Willard Mack (story, screenplay); Joseph W. Farnham (intertitles)
- Produced by: Irving Thalberg (uncredited)
- Starring: Robert Ames
- Cinematography: Max Fabian
- Edited by: William S. Gray; Basil Wrangell
- Production companies: Cosmopolitan Productions; Metro-Goldwyn-Mayer
- Distributed by: Metro-Goldwyn-Mayer
- Release date: April 13, 1929
- Running time: 81 minutes 9 reels (sound version)
- Country: United States
- Language: English

The Voice of the City is a 1929 American pre-Code crime mystery film by Willard Mack and starring Robert Ames. The work uses an original screenplay by Willard Mack, and is not related to the story of the same name by O. Henry.

The film became available on DVD on January 31, 2012 from the Warner Archive Collection.

== Premise ==
The Voice of the City (1929)

A young man is accused of murder and a master detective is set to track him down and uncover conclusive evidence of his guilt, but the more he works on the case, the more he becomes convinced that the accused is not the real killer. He discovers that the murder was committed by a notorious gangster who's attempting to frame the boy.

== Cast ==
- Robert Ames as Bobby Doyle
- Jim Farley as Inspector Wilmot
- Sylvia Field as Beebe
- Willard Mack as Detective Biff Myers
- Clark Marshall as Johnny the Hop aka Snow Bird
- Duane Thompson as Mary Doyle
- Tom McGuire as Detective Kelly
- John Miljan as Don Wilkes
- Alice Moe as Martha
- Beatrice Banyard as Betsy

== See also ==
- List of early sound feature films (1926–1929)
