= The Shadow of Tragedy =

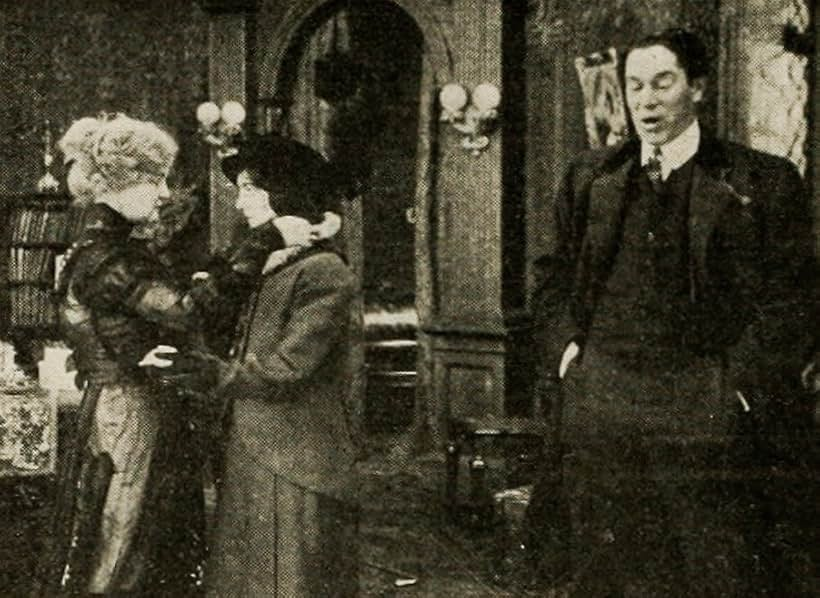
- Film still
- Directed by: Arthur V. Johnson
- Produced by: Siegmund Lubin
- Starring: Arthur V. Johnson; Lottie Briscoe; Mary Carr
- Distributed by: General Film Company
- Release date: July 2, 1914
- Running time: 2 reels
- Country: USA
- Language: Silent..English titles

The Shadow of Tragedy is a lost 1914 silent drama short film directed by and starring Arthur V. Johnson. It was produced by the Lubin Manufacturing Company of Philadelphia.

== Cast ==
- Arthur V. Johnson - Robert Sterling, the Son
- Lottie Briscoe - Mary Sterling
- Charles Brandt - Robert Sterling, the Father
- Mary Carr - Martha Sterling, the Mother (*as Mrs. Carr)
- Raymond Hackett - Robert Sterling (*as a boy)
- Howard M. Mitchell - Tom, Mary's Brother
- Gilbert Ely - The Librarian
