= Jazz Mad =

1928 film

Jazz Mad (also: The Symphony)
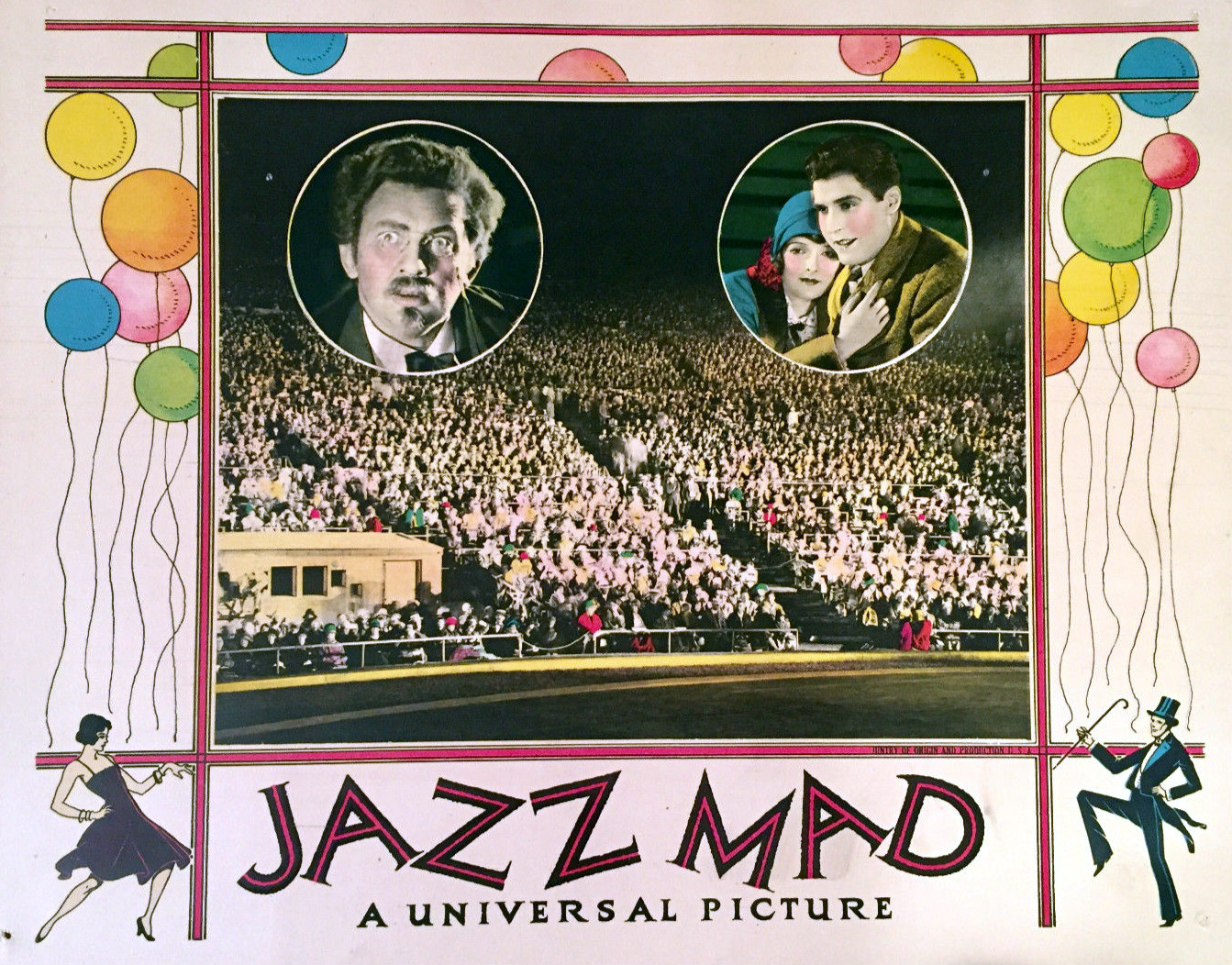
- Lobby card
- Directed by: F. Harmon Weight
- Written by: Charles Kenyon; Walter Anthony
- Story by: Svend Gade (story)
- Produced by: Carl Laemmle
- Starring: Jean Hersholt; Marian Nixon; George J. Lewis
- Cinematography: Gilbert Warrenton
- Edited by: Edward Kahn (as Edward L. Cahn)
- Distributed by: Universal Pictures
- Release date: November 18, 1928
- Running time: 70 minutes
- Country: United States
- Language: Silent (English intertitles)

Jazz Mad is a 1928 American silent drama film directed by F. Harmon Weight and starring Jean Hersholt, Marian Nixon, and George J. Lewis. It was produced and released by Universal Pictures.

== Cast ==
- Jean Hersholt as Franz Hausmann
- Marian Nixon as Elsa Hausmann
- George J. Lewis as Leopold Ostberg
- Roscoe Karns as Sol Levy
- Torben Meyer as Kline
- Andrew Arbuckle as Schmidt
- Charles Clary as Mr. Ostberg
- Clarissa Selwynne as Mrs. Ostberg
- Patricia Caron as Miss Ostberg
- Alfred Hertz as Symphony Conductor
- Virginia Grey (uncredited)

== Preservation status ==
A copy of Jazz Mad is preserved by the Library of Congress Packard Campus and the UCLA Film & Television Archive.
