= Three of a Kind (1925 film) =

1925 film

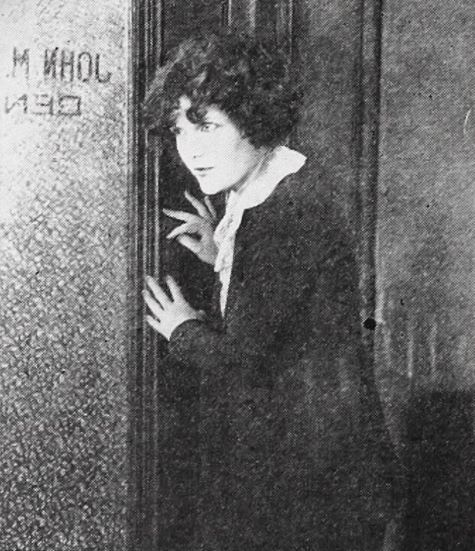
- Still with Brent
- Directed by: F. Harmon Weight; Charles Kerr
- Written by: John C. Brownell; Fred Myton
- Starring: Evelyn Brent
- Cinematography: Roy H. Klaffki
- Production company: Gothic Productions
- Distributed by: Film Booking Offices of America (FBO)
- Release date: 20 September 1925
- Running time: Six reels
- Country: United States
- Language: Silent (English intertitles)

Three of a Kind (also released as Three Wise Crooks) is a lost 1925 American silent crime film directed by F. Harmon Weight and starring Evelyn Brent.

== Plot ==
As described in a film magazine review, Molly Duvans, who works with Dan Pelton and Spug Casey, robs a diamond merchant and makes her getaway through a cleverly contrived fake involving a dental office. In a park she meets Ma Dickenson, nervous and distrait, and at first suspects her of some kind of crookedness. But Ma is genuine. She has lost her purse and her ticket to her home in Greenville. Molly gets her a ticket and sends her home. When the detectives get too warm on the trail of the trio of crooks, Molly goes to Greenville on the invitation of Ma Dickenson, extended to her on the occasion of their first meeting. The old lady and Betsy Ann Morgan do everything possible to make the visitor happy. Molly learns of a plot formed by the town banker and an oil promoter to swindle the townspeople. She sends for her pals to rob the bank. Then she learns that her hostess has sunk all her money in the deal and she has a change of heart. When the men arrive, Spug falls in love with Betsy Ann. Dan is for going ahead with the robbery. He hides in the bank. The banker and his partner in crime enter to get the money. But Molly and Spug have taken it, intending to return the funds to its rightful owners. Spug picks up enough evidence to clear Molly when she is suspected of the robbery. The three crooks go straight thereafter.

== Cast ==
- Evelyn Brent as Molly
- Fanny Midgley as Ma Dickenson (as Fannie Midgley)
- John Gough as Spug Casey
- Bruce Gordon as Don Pelton
- William Humphrey as Grogan
- Carroll Nye as Don Gray
- Dodo Newton as Betsy

== Preservation ==
With no holdings located in archives, Three of a Kind is considered a lost film.
