= Tiger Rose (1923 film) =

Silent film

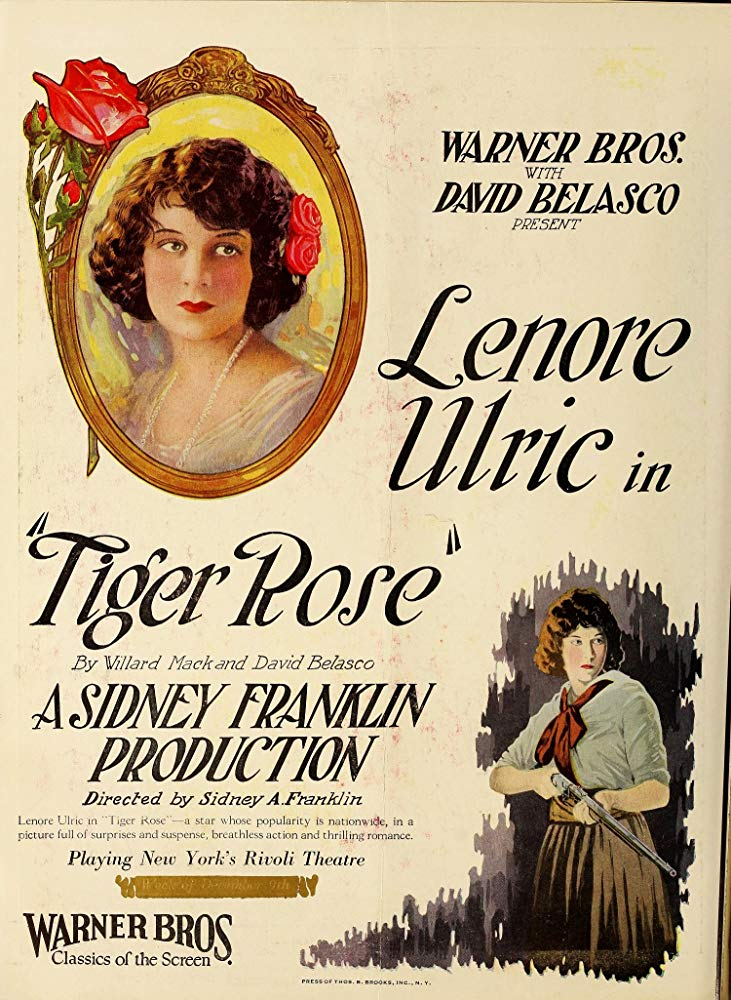
- Directed by: Sidney Franklin
- Written by: Edmund Goulding (scenario); Millard Webb (scenario)
- Based on: Tiger Rose by Willard Mack and David Belasco
- Produced by: David Belasco
- Starring: Lenore Ulric
- Cinematography: Charles Rosher
- Production company: Warner Bros.
- Distributed by: Warner Bros.
- Release date: December 9, 1923
- Running time: 90 minutes; 8 reels
- Country: United States
- Language: Silent (English intertitles)
- Budget: $436,000
- Box office: $505,000 (worldwide rentals)

Tiger Rose is a 1923 American silent romantic adventure film produced and distributed by Warner Bros. Pictures, Inc. It is based on Willard Mack's 1917 Broadway play starring Lenore Ulric. Ulric reprises her role in this silent film version. The story was filmed again in 1929, as Tiger Rose by George Fitzmaurice. The SilentEra database lists this film as surviving.

== Plot ==
As described in a film magazine review, Trooper Michael Devlin of the Royal Northwest Mounted Police saves the life of Rose Bocion. She is an orphan, the ward of factor Hector McCollins. She falls in love with Bruce Norton. Norton slays a man who betrayed his sister and was the cause of his father's death. Aided by Dr. Cusick, who later turns out to be the husband of Norton's sister, Rose helps Norton to escape. Trooper Devlin finally arrests Norton, but he is later freed and later marries Rose.

== Cast ==
- Lenore Ulric as Rose Bocion "Tiger Rose"
- Forrest Stanley as Michael Devlin
- Joseph J. Dowling as Father Thibault
- George Beranger as Pierre
- Sam De Grasse as Dr. Cusick
- Theodore von Eltz as Bruce Norton
- Claude Gillingwater as Hector McCollins
- Frances Starr as Undetermined Role

== Box Office ==
According to Warner Bros records, the film earned $466,000 domestically and $39,000 in foreign markets.
