= Tiger Rose (1929 film) =

1929 film

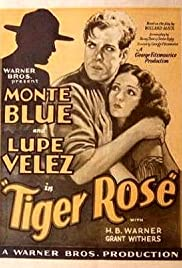
- Theatrical release poster
- Directed by: George Fitzmaurice
- Written by: Gordon Rigby; Harvey F. Thew; De Leon Anthony (titles)
- Based on: Tiger Rose (play) by Willard Mack
- Starring: Monte Blue; Lupe Vélez; Rin Tin Tin; H. B. Warner; Tully Marshall
- Cinematography: Tony Gaudio
- Edited by: Thomas Pratt
- Production company: Warner Bros. Pictures
- Distributed by: Warner Bros. Pictures
- Release date: December 21, 1929
- Running time: 63 minutes; 6 reels
- Country: United States
- Language: English

Tiger Rose is a 1929 American sound (All-Talking) Pre-Code adventure film produced and distributed by Warner Bros. Pictures. It was directed by George Fitzmaurice and is based on a 1917 play, Tiger Rose, by Willard Mack. This film is a remake of the 1923 film Tiger Rose, a Warner Bros. silent that starred Lenore Ulric, who also starred on Broadway in Mack's play. Among the cast members in this film are Monte Blue, Lupe Vélez and Rin Tin Tin.

Both adaptations 1923 and 1929 exist. The Library of Congress has an incomplete copy. A 16mm copy is housed at the Wisconsin Center for Film & Theater Research.

== Plot ==
Rose, a French Canadian girl known as the “Tiger Rose,” is the ward and adopted daughter of Hector McCollins, the Hudson's Bay Company factor in a remote northern settlement. She attracts the attention of several suitors in the settlement.

Among those in love with her are Sergeant Devlin of the Northwest Mounted Police, a blarneying Irishman; Joe, an Italian; Frenchie; and Pierre. But Rose's heart belongs to Bruce, a young engineer and surveyor who has been traveling through the district laying out plans for a railroad. They have shared secret trysts and pledged their love to each other.

Dr. Cusick, the erratic but caring physician who looks after the loggers and trappers, has a fanatical hatred of civilization and keeps a jealous watch over Rose.

A group of railroad workers arrives, attempting to camp near the trading post, but are ordered away by local inhabitants, especially Dr. Cusick, who does not want the railroad to disrupt their wilderness way of life. Bruce travels upriver by canoe to survey the railroad route. Meanwhile, tensions escalate when the railroad men drive off their teams through McCollins’ garden patch, sparking a fight that is only quelled by Rose and her fierce dog, Scotty. Sergeant Devlin and his men restore order, but bitterness remains and the railroad workers leave.

That evening, an Indian runner brings word to Rose that Bruce is making a daring 150-mile canoe trip to meet her that night at their usual secret rendezvous. After skillfully avoiding her other admirers, Rose keeps the appointment. However, Dr. Cusick suspects her and follows, catching her in Bruce's arms. He overhears their plan to run away together. Rose, aware of the danger posed by the railroad men and especially McCollins’ disapproval of her marrying Bruce, wants to keep him hidden.

Later, Cusick confronts Rose, who admits her love for Bruce and her intent to marry him. Cusick makes Rose promise that Bruce will come to see him at 8 P.M. the next day. When Bruce arrives, Cusick intercepts him, offers him a drink, then, in a violent rage, attempts to shoot him for trying to take Rose away to the city. Bruce struggles with the maddened doctor, who has taken Bruce's revolver, and in the fight kills Cusick. A lamp is knocked over during the scuffle, starting a fire. Fearing the locals’ wrath, Bruce flees.

Devlin and his men arrive to put out the fire and find Bruce's revolver. They begin a manhunt for him. Pierre discovers Bruce but Rose threatens Pierre's life if he betrays Bruce, declaring that if anything happens to him she will kill herself.

Attempts are made by Devlin and McCollins to use Rose's dog Scotty to track Bruce, but Rose hides the dog to protect Bruce. Later, Bruce is shot off his horse by a Mountie, and Scotty finds him and leads Rose to hide him in a cellar.

Pierre witnesses Rose hiding Bruce and is persuaded by her to help keep his secret. When Devlin arrives out of a rainstorm, Pierre convinces him to rest instead of continuing the search.

Eventually, Rose escapes with Bruce down the river by canoe, evading Devlin's men who are pursuing them on land. During the escape, Devlin discovers Rose hiding under a blanket in the canoe. Upon learning of her love for Bruce and the circumstances of Cusick's death, he chooses to aid them.

Together, they ride the rapids and land on a small island. Devlin tells them to go on to freedom and love. Later, drenched and exhausted, Devlin is rescued by an associate. To protect Rose and Bruce, Devlin reports that they perished in the rapids — his story that he sticks to. In truth, he helped the woman he loved escape with the man she truly cared for.

== Cast ==
- Monte Blue as Devlin
- Lupe Vélez as Rose
- H. B. Warner as Dr. Cusick
- Tully Marshall as Hector McCollins
- Grant Withers as Bruce
- Gaston Glass as Pierre
- Bull Montana as Joe
- Rin Tin Tin as Scotty
- Slim Summerville as Heine
- Louis Mercier as Frenchie
- Gordon Magee as Hainey
- Heinie Conklin as Gus
- Fred MacMurray as a Rancher (non credited)

== Music ==
The film features a theme song entitled "The Day You Fall in Love" which was composed by Ned Washington, Herb Magidson and Michael Cleary. Lupe Velez sings the song in the film. The song is also played frequently as background music by the Vitaphone orchestra throughout the film.

== See also ==
- List of early sound feature films (1926–1929)
