= Willard Mack =

American actor (1873–1934)

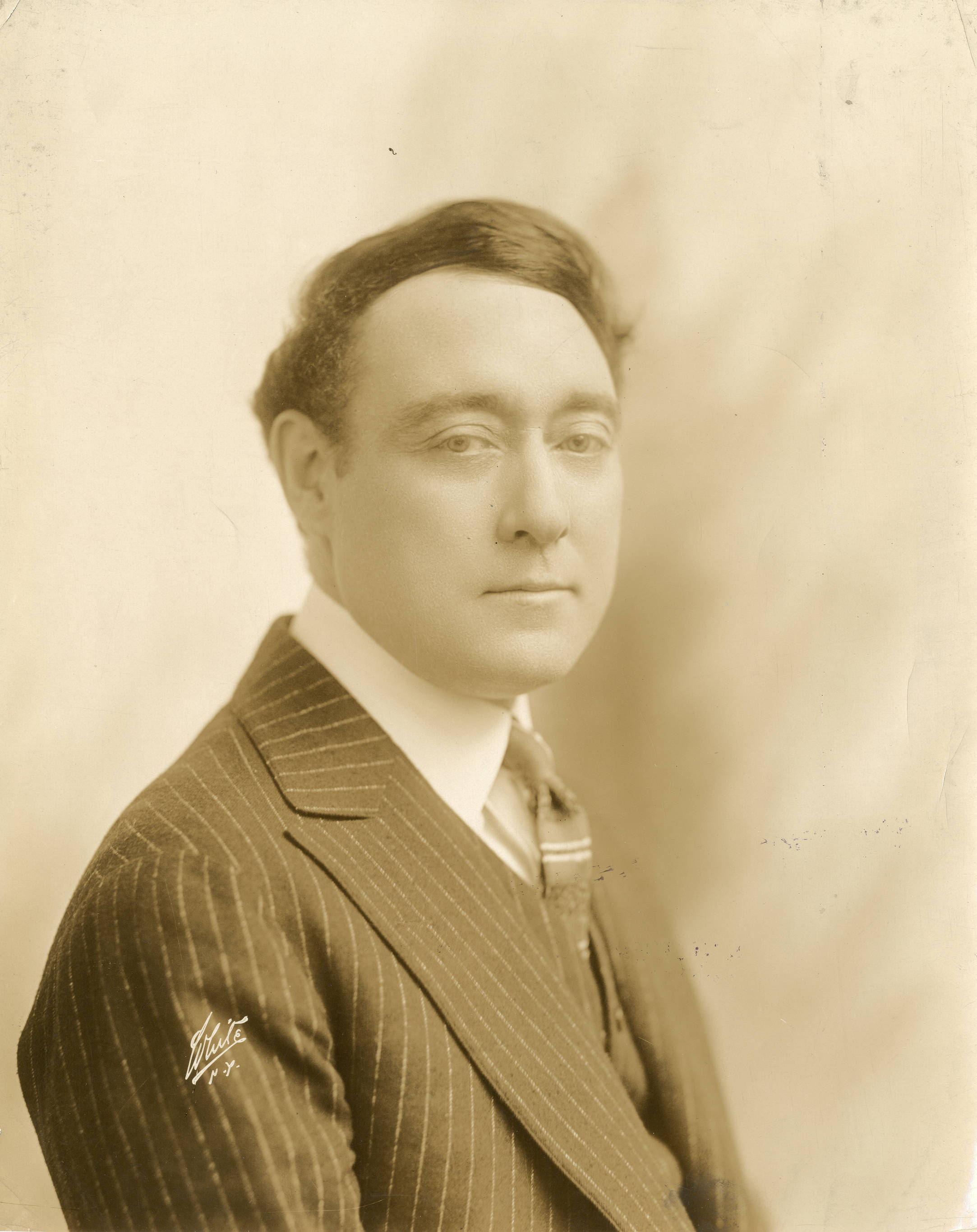
- Mack in 1924
- Born: Charles Willard McLaughlin; September 18, 1873; Morrisburg, Ontario, Canada
- Died: November 18, 1934 (aged 61); Brentwood, Los Angeles, California, U.S.
- Occupations: Actor; director; playwright
- Years active: 1913–1934
- Spouses: Maude Leone (m. 1903; div. 1910) Marjorie Rambeau (m. 1912; div. 1917) Pauline Frederick (m. 1917; div. 1920) Beatrice Banyard (m. 1927)

Willard Mack (September 18, 1873 – November 18, 1934) was a Canadian-American actor, director, and playwright.

== Life and career ==
He was born Charles Willard McLaughlin in Morrisburg, Ontario. At an early age his family moved to Brooklyn, New York. After two years, they moved to Cedar Rapids, Iowa, where McLaughlin finished high school. His parents returned to Canada, but he went on to study at Georgetown University in Washington, D. C., where he became involved in student plays. Adopting the stage name Willard Mack, after graduation he took minor acting jobs for a few years and did Shakespearian repertoire. However, writing scripts was what he was most interested in, and his second effort, about the North-West Mounted Police, In Wyoming, was a commercial success and was later the basis for his film Nanette of the Wilds. Throughout his life, Mack frequently returned to Canada. Some of his other plays, including Tiger Rose and The Scarlet Fox, were set in northern Alberta.

In 1914, he made his acting debut on Broadway in a play he had written. Over the next fourteen years, he would write a further twenty-two Broadway productions, acting in ten of them and producing four. For a time, Willard Mack operated a stock company with actress Maude Leone. In the mid-1920s, he met an aspiring stage actress named Ruby Stevens hired as a chorus girl for his new play. Mack coached Stevens's acting and rewrote parts of the play to expand her role and then persuaded her to change her name to Barbara Stanwyck.

During his time on Broadway, Mack began writing for motion pictures, and although he performed in fifteen films and directed four, he was primarily a writer. At first he remained on the east coast but later moved to Los Angeles. A number of his plays were made into motion pictures, and between 1916 and 1933 he was involved with the writing of more than seventy film scripts. Starting out in silent film, he made his talkie debut as actor, director, and co-writer of the 1929 film Voice of the City. In 1933 he directed What Price Innocence?. He then wrote and directed Broadway to Hollywood, a backstage musical that spanned nearly five decades recounting the struggles of a vaudeville family.

He was married four times, to actresses Maude Leone, Marjorie Rambeau, Pauline Frederick, and Beatrice Banyard.

His writing success made him a wealthy man. He died from heart disease at his home in Brentwood, Los Angeles, California, in 1934.

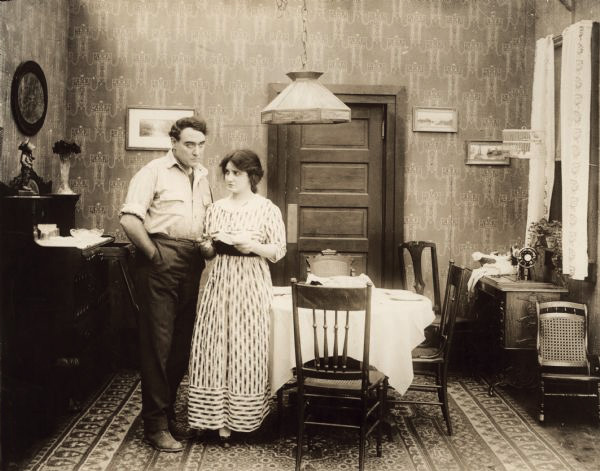
Unemployed worker John Adams (Willard Mack) and his wife (Clara Williams) are faced with bills they cannot pay in a still from The Corner (1916).

== Plays ==
- Kick In (1914)
- Tiger Rose (1917)
- Blind Youth (1917)
- The Logic of Larry (1919)
- Fu Manchu : A Chinese Melodrama (1919) - written with Sax Rohmer
- The Dove (1925, based on a story by Gerald Beaumont)
- The Noose (1926)
- A Free Soul (1928, based on a novel by Adela Rogers St. Johns)
- Spring 3100 (1928)

== Filmography ==
- Kick In, directed by George Fitzmaurice (1917, based on the play Kick In)
- Aladdin's Other Lamp, directed by John H. Collins (1917, based on the play The Dream Girl)
- Blind Youth, directed by Edward Sloman (1920, based on the play Blind Youth)
- The Common Sin, directed by Burton L. King (1920, based on the play The Common Sin)
- Kick In, directed by George Fitzmaurice (1922, based on the play Kick In)
- Your Friend and Mine, directed by Clarence G. Badger (1923, based on the play Your Friend and Mine)
- Tiger Rose, directed by Sidney Franklin (1923, based on the play Tiger Rose)
- The Dove, directed by Roland West (1927, based on the play The Dove)
- The Noose, directed by John Francis Dillon (1928, based on the play The Noose)
- Tiger Rose, directed by George Fitzmaurice (1929, based on the play Tiger Rose)
- Kick In, directed by Richard Wallace (1931, based on the play Kick In)
- A Free Soul, directed by Clarence Brown (1931, based on the play A Free Soul)
- Girl of the Rio, directed by Herbert Brenon (1932, based on the play The Dove)
- Jealousy, directed by Roy William Neill (1934, based on the play Spring 3100)
- The Drag-Net, directed by Vin Moore (1936, based on the play The Drag-Net)
- I'd Give My Life, directed by Edwin L. Marin (1936, based on the play The Noose)
- The Girl and the Gambler, directed by Lew Landers (1939, based on the play The Dove)
- The Girl Who Had Everything, directed by Richard Thorpe (1953, based on the play A Free Soul)

=== Screenwriter ===
- The Lost Bridegroom (dir. James Kirkwood, 1916)
- The Saleslady (dir. Frederick A. Thomson, 1916)
- Mixed Blood (1916)
- Her Maternal Right (dir. John Ince and Robert Thornby, 1916)
- A Gutter Magdalene (dir. George Melford, 1916)
- Nanette of the Wilds (dir. Joseph Kaufman, 1916)
- The Highway of Hope (dir. Howard Estabrook, 1917)
- Who's Your Neighbor? (dir. S. Rankin Drew, 1917)
- Yankee Pluck (1917)
- The Woman Beneath (1917)
- Go West, Young Man (1918)
- The Wasp (1918)
- The Hell Cat (dir. Reginald Barker, 1918)
- Shadows (dir. Reginald Barker, 1919)
- One Week of Life (dir. Hobart Henley, 1919)
- The Valley of Doubt (1920)
- Heritage (dir. William L. Roubert, 1920)
- Welcome Stranger (dir. James Young, 1924)
- Little Robinson Crusoe (dir. Edward F. Cline, 1924)
- The Rag Man (dir. Edward F. Cline, 1925)
- The Monster (dir. Roland West, 1925)
- Old Clothes (dir. Edward F. Cline, 1925)
- Madame X, (dir. Lionel Barrymore, 1929)
- His Glorious Night, (dir. Lionel Barrymore, 1929)
- Untamed (dir. Jack Conway, 1929)
- It's a Great Life (dir. Sam Wood, 1929)
- Caught Short (dir. Charles Reisner, 1930)
- Men of the North (dir. Hal Roach, 1930)
- Reducing (dir. Charles Reisner, 1931)
- Sidewalks of New York (dir. Zion Myers and Jules White, 1931)
- The Billion Dollar Scandal (dir. Harry Joe Brown, 1933)
- Strictly Personal (dir. Ralph Murphy, 1933)
- Night of Terror (dir. Benjamin Stoloff, 1933)
- Song of the Eagle (dir. Ralph Murphy, 1933)
- Nana (dir. Dorothy Arzner and George Fitzmaurice, 1934)

=== Director ===
- Voice of the City (1929)
- What Price Innocence? (1933)
- Broadway to Hollywood (1933)
- Together We Live (1935)

=== Actor ===
- Aloha Oe (1915), as David Harmon
- The Edge of the Abyss (1915), as Jim Sims
- The Corner (1916), as John Adams
- Nanette of the Wilds (1916), as Constable Thomas O'Brien
- The Woman on the Index (1923), as Hugo Declasse
- Your Friend and Mine (1923), as Ted Mason
- Voice of the City (1929), as Detective Biff Myers
- What Price Innocence? (1933), as Dr. Dan Davidge
- Together We Live (1935), as Hank

== Bibliography ==
- Skinner, Ches (January 1, 2000). ""It was our north land that we saw": Willard Mack and the Great Northwest". Theatre Research in Canada / Recherches théâtrales au Canada. 21: 27–37. doi:10.3138/tric.21.1.27. ISSN 1913-9101.
- Skinner, Ches (January 26, 1993). "Detective work reveals man behind Willard Mack". Lethbridge Herald. p. 8.
