= What Price Innocence? =

1933 film by Willard Mack

- Directed by: Willard Mack
- Written by: Willard Mack
- Produced by: Bryan Foy
- Starring: Jean Parker; Minna Gombell; Willard Mack; Betty Grable; Bryant Washburn; Ben Alexander; Louise Beavers
- Cinematography: Joseph A. Valentine
- Edited by: Arthur Hilton
- Production company: Bryan Foy Productions
- Distributed by: Columbia Pictures
- Release date: June 24, 1933
- Running time: 64 minutes
- Country: United States
- Language: English

What Price Innocence? is a 1933 American pre-Code drama film written and directed by, and co-starring, Willard Mack. Produced on a low budget for Columbia Pictures, it has been classed as an exploitation film and "sex hygiene film" because it touches on teenage pregnancy and morality in a didactic manner. The film features a teenaged Betty Grable in an early film role.

== Plot ==
Dr. Dan Davidge, a kindly, old family doctor, travels from house to house, observing the children he has brought into the world as they grow into adults. His favorite is seventeen-year-old Ruth Harper, a pretty, lively youngster who is far more innocent than her "flapper" friends. Davidge asks Ruth's father John if the girl has been informed about the facts of life, and the disconcerted father fatefully defers to his repressed and judgmental wife, Amy.

Believing her own example of quiet and respectable life is sufficient, Amy refuses to discuss sex with her daughter. Ruth is deeply in love with Tommy Harrow, a carefree boy several years older than she, and she becomes confused by the pressure he puts on her and her feelings toward him.

Despite the doctor's urging, Amy still refuses to address Ruth's questions and concerns. One evening after a wild party, Tommy persuades Ruth to accompany him home. Time passes as Ruth, who is now even more in love with Tommy, grows upset by his coolness toward her after their intimate night. She goes to Davidge, who quickly realizes that her "little attack of anemia" is what it seems—pregnancy.

Davidge confronts Tommy, who callously refuses to accept his responsibilities, then informs John and Amy about Ruth's pregnancy. The bewildered John attempts to offer sympathy, but Amy, furious over the potential scandal, castigates Ruth. The distraught girl is sent to a country resort, where, overwhelmed by the rejection she has experienced from Tommy and her mother, she drowns herself.

== Cast ==
- Jean Parker as Ruth Harper
- Minna Gombell as Amy Harper
- Willard Mack as Dr. Dan Davidge
- Betty Grable as Beverly Bennett
- Bryant Washburn as John Harper
- Ben Alexander as Tommy Harrow
- Louise Beaver as Hannah

== Production ==
Mack's taking on multiple roles in the film (as lead actor, director and writer) was unusual in American filmmaking at the time, though it was not uncommon in low-budget, exploitation film production.

== Release and reception ==
In addition to producing and releasing this film, Columbia Pictures reissued the previously banned sex-hygiene film Damaged Lives. The film was also known by the title Shall We Tell Our Daughter?. In at least one theater, the Strand in Lewiston, Maine, it played on a double bill with the comedy Diplomaniacs. It was paired with Samarang when it played at the Edwards Theatre in Sarasota. It appeared on a double bill with The Masquerader in San Jose's Liberty Theatre, along with a shorts program that featured Disney's The Pied Piper.

What Price Innocence? received mixed reviews. A critic for The New York Times wrote: "Judged on general entertainment standards, it is an embarrassing film. ... The film is presented with a certain blunt skill and it is produced with a certain sincerity. But it has none of the subtlety, indirection or dramatic power needed to make the theme palatable for the public screens." Other reviewers commended the film for its frank treatment of its subject, and for Willard Mack's performance. The Baltimore Afro-American: "Whether you accept (Dr. Davidge's) views of not, you will find the story an interesting and skillfully treated one." The Sarasota Herald-Tribune lauded the performances of Parker, Mack and Gombell in this "moving, human photodrama."

In Canada, What Price Innocence? was given a good review when it played in Montreal on a double bill with Saturday's Millions. The film was well reviewed in Australia, when it played at the Capitol Theatre in Sydney. "Willard Mack's impersonation as Dr. Dan Davidge," wrote the author of the Sydney Morning Herald review, "is the best thing in the play."
