= Forrest Halsey =

American screenwriter

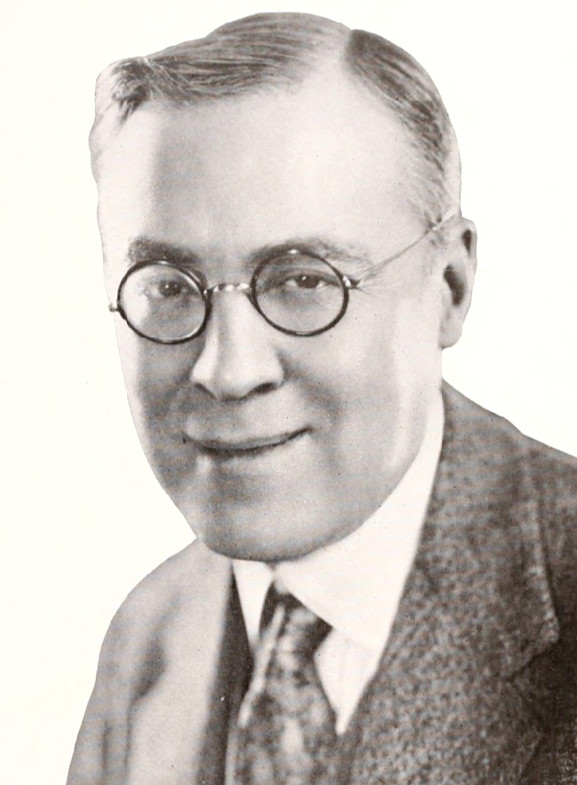
- Halsey in 1926
- Born: November 9, 1877; Roseville, New Jersey, USA
- Died: September 30, 1949 (aged 71); Los Angeles County, California, USA
- Occupation: Screenwriter
- Years active: 1913–1942

William Forrest Halsey (November 9, 1877 – September 30, 1949) was an American writer and screenwriter.

Halsey's novels included Fate and the Butterfly (1909), The Bawlerout (1912), and The Shadow on the Hearth (1914). From 1907 to 1918, he published more than one hundred short stories in popular magazines including Young's Magazine, The Argosy, The Cavalier, and Munsey's Magazine.

As a screenwriter, he wrote for more than 60 films between 1913 and 1942. He was born in Roseville, Newark, New Jersey, and died in Los Angeles County, California.

== Selected filmography ==
- Ashes of Embers (1916)
- A Broadway Saint (1919)
- The Green Goddess (1923)
- Monsieur Beaucaire (1924)
- A Sainted Devil (1924)
- Twenty Dollars a Week (1924)
- Camille of the Barbary Coast (1925)
- Stage Struck (1925)
- Sally of the Sawdust (1925)
- The Palm Beach Girl (1926)
- The Sorrows of Satan (1926)
- Broadway Nights (1927)
- The Whip Woman (1928)
- Her Private Life (1929)
- The Divine Lady (1929)
- Kept Husbands (1931)
- The Lady Who Dared (1931)
- Silver Queen (1942)
