= Witch Island =

Wildlife sanctuary off the coast of South Bristol, Maine

- Location within Maine

Geography
- Location: South Bristol, Maine
- Coordinates: 43.870097°N 69.550793°W
- Adjacent to: Johns Bay
- Area: 18 acres (7.3 ha)

Administration
- United States
- State: Maine

Demographics
- Population: 0

Witch Island is an approximately 18-acre (7.3 ha) wildlife sanctuary off the coast of South Bristol, Maine, United States.

Witch Island received its name from Anna Chittenden. She was an actress, lecturer, clairvoyant and palmist. Her stage name was Grace Courtland. She claimed unusual powers to predict the future. So many of her predictions of Wall Street stocks came true that James R. Keene nicknamed her the "Witch of Wall Street." She was well-known in the United States and England in the late 19th century. When the Anna and her husband, Dan, purchased the island in 1886 from the Davis family, they began calling it Witch Island.

It had been known as Davis Island from prior owner Captain Samuel H. Davis, but "Witch Island" is now the name of record on maps, in books and journals, and documented in government records.

== History ==
=== The Gamage family (pre-1830) ===
One of the earliest documented names for the island was Stewart's Island.

The Gamage family of South Bristol were the earliest identified proprietors. How it attained the name Stewart's remains unknown.

==== Gamage History ====
Gamage began as Gamache of Norwegian origins. Rolla the Dane, a pirate, travelled from the north in search of lands and spoils. He arrived in France in 912 with another man named Inczar. They terrorized the people such that Charles the Simple relinquished part of Neustria to Rolla the Dane. Rolla granted landed estates to his accomplices, which included Inczar. These men dubbed the area, Normandy. Inczar received lands known as the Gamache Marshes. Over time, family members began bearing de Gamache as part of their names.

Several generations later, two de Gamache brothers, came with William the Conqueror to England. By the 1300s, Sir William de Gamage of Royiade attained Coity Castle upon the death of Sir Laurence of Berkerolles of New Orchard. Sir Thomas Gamage, several generations later in, was the first to drop the "de" from his surname. From Sir Thomas, the Gamage family became known as "of Coity".

Sir Robert Gamage and his wife, Joan, had two sons and 4 daughters. His eldest son, Sir John, married Wenlien, an heiress. They bore a single daughter, Barbara. Barbara was of considerable fortune with many suitors and a popular lady-in-waiting to Elizabeth I, so much so, that the queen married her to Robert Sidney, 1st Earl of Leicester. When older his brother, Philip Sidney, died from injuries at the Battle of Zutphen, Robert became the heir to Robert Dudley, 1st Earl of Leicester. Barbara Sidney, Countess of Leicester and her husband had eleven children, all of whom survived. She lived and died in Penshurst Place; however, her death marked the end of the titled lineage of Gamage.

Sir Robert Gamage's second son, Thomas, produced two children. Of their many great-grandchildren, three pairs of brothers, each named John and Thomas, existed. Which of these pairs landed in Massachusetts, no one knows. For certain, one Thomas was a rebel, potentially of the Monmouth Rebellion. He was convicted and sold to Ann Salop of Barbados. After serving his sentence, he joined his brother, John, in Massachusetts.

Along with the one Thomas Gamage, there was one brother John Gamage. The end of the 17th century in England was a tumultuous one with religious differences at the centerpiece. John's participation is unknown, but he escaped for America before he could be exiled and became an early settler of Ipswich, Massachusetts, in the late 1600s. The family settled and grew in Massachusetts. John had five children: John, Nathaniel, Mary, Joshua and Sarah.

John's fourth child, Joshua was a weaver in Cambridge, Massachusetts. He was born prior to 1700 and died after 1744. He married Deborah Wyeth and she gave him 10 children: Mary, Nathaniel, William, Ruth, Sarah, John, Martha, Rebecca, Elizabeth and Daniel. Mary perished an infant, making Nathaniel the eldest child.

Dr. Nathaniel Gamage (b 1712), married Mary Norwood. He travelled to England for settle an estate left to the family by their ancestors. Rumored to get press-ganged into the English Navy, Dr. Gamage vanished and was never heard from again. After his disappearance, Mary Norwood Gamage returned with her children to Rockport, Massachusetts. In 1795, she removed to Bristol, Maine to live on the family farm. They were noted early settlers of South Bristol and the first of the Gamage family in Maine. She lived until the ripe age of 104, sharp of mind to the end.

William Gamage (1714-1783), Joshua's next oldest behind Nathaniel, married Abigail Cook in 1746. The settled in Watertown, Massachusetts, and had eight children: William, Abigail (died young), Samuel, Joshua, Daniel (died young), Abigail, Daniel and John.

Now, William's fourth child, Joshua (1753-1843), was a drummer in Thomas Gardner's regiment at the Battle of Bunker Hill. Born in Cambridge, Joshua became the second known of the Gamage family to settle in Maine. He married Mary Beaton of Cambridge, and together they raised their family in Fryeburg, Maine. Their children were: Joshua, Mary, Anna (died at 4 years old), Abigail (died at 2 years old), Anna (born a week after Anna died), Amelia, Abigail, Martha, Rebecca, John, Sarah, William, Susan and Caleb. William remarried after Mary died in 1825; however, he had no children with Hannah Gordon.

Joshua (1778-1855) of his father's namesake and eldest child was born in Cambridge, Massachusetts prior to his parents moving the family to Fryeburg, Maine. He married Priscilla Farrington in 1802 in Fryeburg before moving to Sweden, Maine. They raised their family and lived out their lives there.

==== Hamilton's Island ====
George F. Sproule (1741-1817) was an Irish surveyor. He served as the Surveyor general for the Colony of New Hampshire pre-Revolutionary War and mostly remembered as the first Surveyor general of New Brunswick. He was hired by Samuel Holland in 1770 to survey and map out the mid-coast of Maine. Sproule's 1772 map of the area had the island documented as Hamilton's Island. Sproule's map retain the reputation for great accuracy. If a name was placed on a location, someone lived there. This means a Hamilton occupied the island and a dwelling did occupy the southwest corner. Who Hamilton was remains unknown. How it became or transferred to Stewart (Stuart) or the identity of Stewart (Stuart) remains unknown; however, the island's name was Stewart's (Stuart's) Island when the Gamages owned it.

==== Stewart's (Stuart's) Island ====
Between John Gamage's arrival in Ipswich and Joshua's settling in Sweden, Maine, the Gamage family came into ownership of Stewarts's Island. The island comprised approximately 16 acres per old reports. Today, records indicate 18 acres.

Near nothing is known of Stewart except he was the prior owner. All that remained of his ownership was two cellars and a stone wall.

===== French and Indian War =====
A French and Indian War story from 1744 involved a British sloop and French corvette. The corvette pursued the sloop, but the British captain knew the waters and that his boat would move quicker than the corvette. Astutely, he lured the French into the ledges just east of Stewart's Island. While the sloop sailed through with little difficulty and escaped, the corvette got stuck in the mud. In order to reduce weight and wake, the French tossed brass cannon overboard. Divers, more than once, have attempted to recover the cannon without success. Since the incident, that area of Johns Bay has been known as the Corvette Ledges.

===== American Revolution =====
The sale of the island in 1916 evoked an American Revolutionary War story, more on the order of folklore. A British frigate attempted to get passed the cannon of an old fort at Pemaquid. Pemaquid had three known forts over time. Which fort remains a mystery. They failed. The ship sank just off the coast of the island. Over time, a number of bronze cannon and other treasures were recovered from the shipwreck.

==== Dixey Bull, the Dread Pirate ====
Some other traditional folklore involved pirate, Dixie Bull or Dixey Bull, "The Dread Pirate". Dixie Bull arrived in Boston in 1631 and is considered the first pirate in New England. He originally worked as a fur trader, but some Frenchmen in a pinnace raided his boat and inventory. He put together about fifteen men of questionable origin and set out to recover his goods. The Frenchmen evaded him, so desperate for goods, he began raiding small vessels. From this, he headed to the trading stations at Pemaquid. His attacks and raids over the next couple years there earned him the title of Dread Pirate. One story had him killed in the bay. Others had him escaping with his winnings back to England. No one knows the truth. It was rumored he made his headquarters on Stewart's Island.

=== Griffin family (1803-at least 1815) ===
==== Stewart's Island sold ====
Records document that Dr. Nathaniel and Mary's grandson, Nathaniel Gamage, sold the island as well as 30 acres on Rutherford Island to Nathaniel Griffin, of Bristol himself, on May 1, 1803, for $1,150. The large amount certainly represented the land and buildings on Rutherford as Stewart's (Stuart's) Island was small with no recorded buildings. An 1815 Bristol town plan depicts the Griffin family in possession of the island.

The sale of the island may not have been final or ownership by the Griffins came into question. Between 1815 and 1830, the Gamage family came back into ownership of Stewart's (Stuart's) Island.

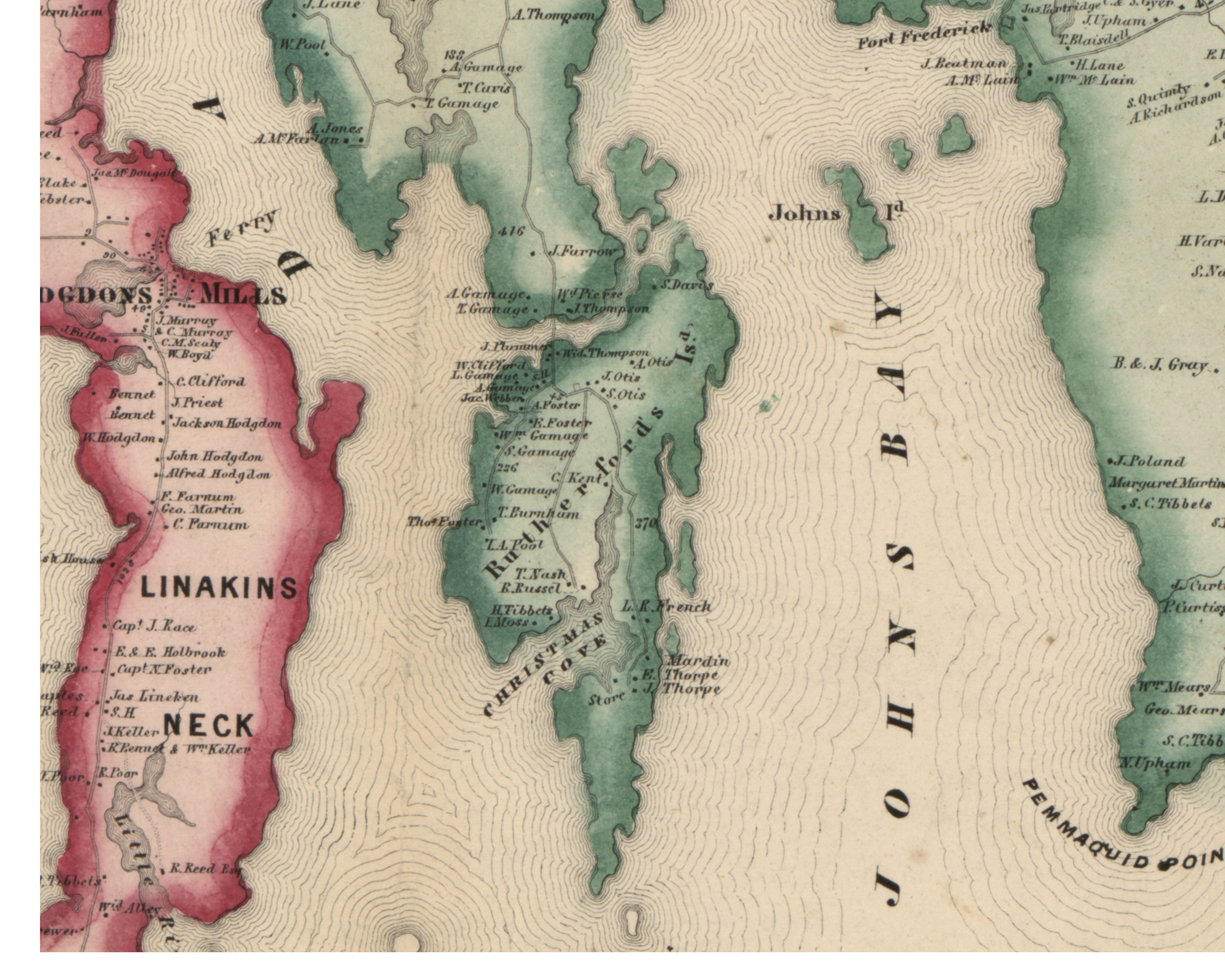
Cutout of an 1857 topographical land survey/map of Lincoln County maintained by the Library of Congress which emphasizes South Bristol on Rutherford Island. Perusing reveals Samuel Davis property at the north of the island along with numerous properties owned by members of the Gamage family. Witch Island lies north of the Davis land with tiny Gem Island in between. Both islands are unlabeled.

=== Davis Island and the Davis family (1830–1887) ===
==== Davis buys Stewart's Island ====
It was documented Griffin's heirs supposedly sold the island 27 years later to Captain Samuel H Davis (1807-1884), a fisherman and farmer, on July 27, 1830. Davis' 1880 last will and testament debunked this account.

Quoting directly from the will, "...the Island lying north of Rutherford's Island in said Bristol known as Stewart's Island, being the same island conveyed to me by Joshua Gamage and Priscilla Gamage by their deed bearing date November 10th, 1830 and recorded in Lincoln County, Maine Registry of Deeds Book 156, Page 286 to have and to hold to him and his heirs and assigns forever."

This evidence resolves that Davis attained the island from Joshua and Priscilla Gamage and not Nathaniel Griffin. No distinction exists whether he purchased the island or the Gamage family imparted it to him. He still took ownership 1830.

Up through at least 1837, the island was still referenced it as Stewart's (Stuart's) Island. By 1860, charts began representing it as Davis Island. Henceforth, the island became known as Davis Island.

During 1860, Atlantic menhaden or more commonly pogies, porgies and bunkers became a cheap alternative for whale oil. Porgy oil found its way into dressing leather and paint oil formulas. Originally, fisherman caught porgies for bait. They came in great shoals, and fishermen used seines to gather them in great abundance. In addition to oil, porgy scrap became a popular fertilizer for farms. Within ten years, porgy fishing grew into a major industry. The waters surrounding Davis Island reigned among the better known locations to haul in large numbers of porgies. In fact, an opinion emerged regarding overfishing. Laws limiting porgy harvesting passed, but the industry was already large. By the early twentieth century, most of the Maine menhaden fisheries went defunct. Under the guise of icebergs and cold water driving the stock southward as opposed to overfishing depleting the waters, some fisherman followed the menhaden down the Atlantic coast.

Captain Davis died on November 9, 1884, and his family interred him at Island Cemetery in South Bristol next to his first wife, Mary.

==== Davis family feud ====
A lawsuit arose in 1886 between his heirs with his first wife and Davis' second wife, also Mary. Freeman, his second son, and his attorneys laid claim to his father's real estate, but Mary still lived in their house. As her defense, she claimed the real estate under the will. Of note, Davis' will was signed July 13, 1880.

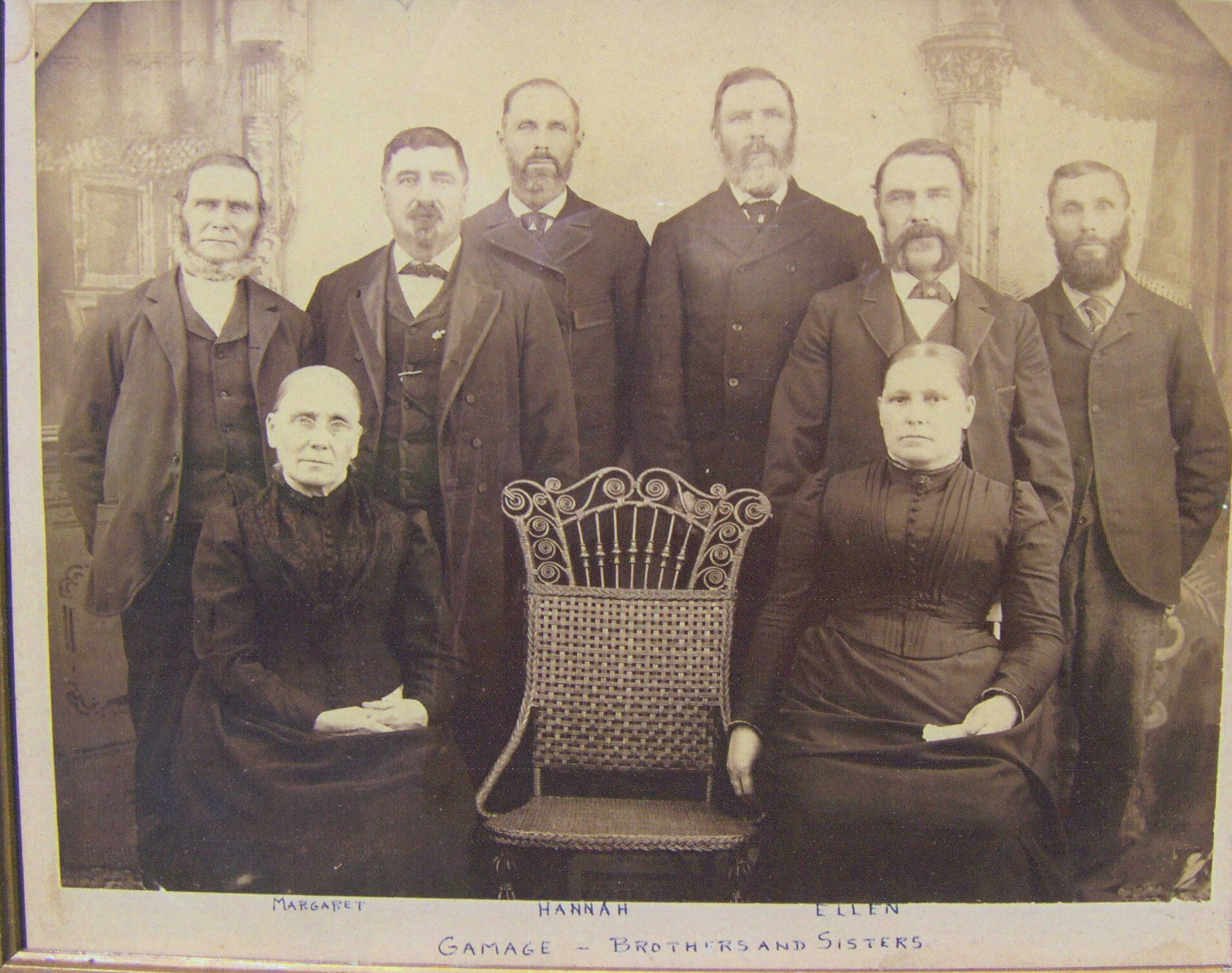
Gamage brothers and sisters, approximately 1876 after Hannah Gamage's death. Albion O. Gamage is back row, third from left. Nelson W. Gamage is back row, far right.

Unequivocally, the Davis and Gamage families maintained a good relationship over the years. On December 2, 1884, some weeks after Samuel's death, Mary Davis waived her rights of administration to the will, recommending Albion O. Gamage to the role, which he undertook. Albion O. Gamage was a ship builder right in Bristol. He was the grandson of Joshua and Priscilla Gamage, the couple who conveyed the island to Davis in the first place. When they inventoried Davis property and holdings, one of the appraisers was another grandson of Joshua and Priscilla as well Albion's brother, Nelson W. Gamage. Nelson was a grocer, also, in Bristol.

Between December 1884 and February 6, 1886, Thomas Boyd, a local Justice of the Peace/Sheriff, was assigned guardian of Mary's children, Josaphine Oram and William. During this same period, Mary remarried to Henry R. Odlum, a ship's carpenter and fisherman whose wife, Sarah, had died in 1885. Some level of family scandal must have ensued with their father's second wife now living in their childhood home already remarried to another man. Whether the situation played a role in the litigation of Davis' children against Mary Odlum is unknown.

Of intangible interest, William Odlum and Josaphine Oram Davis married in 1900. They were step brother and sister.

In a document signed February 6, 1886, Mary Odlum and Thomas Boyd released Albion Odlum of any liability with the estate. This was less than three months prior to the trial date. Since legal proceedings tend to protract, the Davis' children likely long filed the suit. Thomas and Mary used this note to liberate the Gamage family from attachment to the case.

The trouble stemmed from his last will and testament of July 30, 1880. Undoubtedly not his first will and testament, he created this will with his second wife and young children, Josaphine Oram and William, in mind. All his children from his first marriage were adults. On the other hand, Josie and William were seven and three in 1880, respectively. Quoting from the fifth clause of the will, "I wish to state that I have designedly omitted to make any provision herein for my other children as I consider them competent to take care of themselves." The callous rhetoric alluded to potential challenges within the family for Samuel Davis to completely cut all his adult children from any inheritance.

Per Davis' will, he owned a field, pasture and island. Appraisers valued his real estate at $591. Specifically, they assessed Davis Island at $233. Specifically, he left the island to his son, William, who was nine years old in 1886.

The trial lasted two days in late April 1886. The jury had the case in their hands for over 2 hours. They struggled with multifarious legal complexities involved. In the end, they ruled in favor of Freeman Davis and his siblings. Gilbert Fisher, Mary's attorney, did file a motion to set aside this verdict and associated exceptions. To what end is unknown.

==== Davis Island sold ====
Some ownership clearly remained with Mary and her children because they were able to sell the island. On behalf of young William, Thomas Boyd sold Davis Island to Daniel Gano and Anna Chittenden on October 29, 1887, only a year and a half after the trial. Boyd sold it to the Chittendens in undivided equal sections for $200. With this sale, any association of the Gamage and Davis families to the property ended.

=== Witch Island (1887–1925) ===
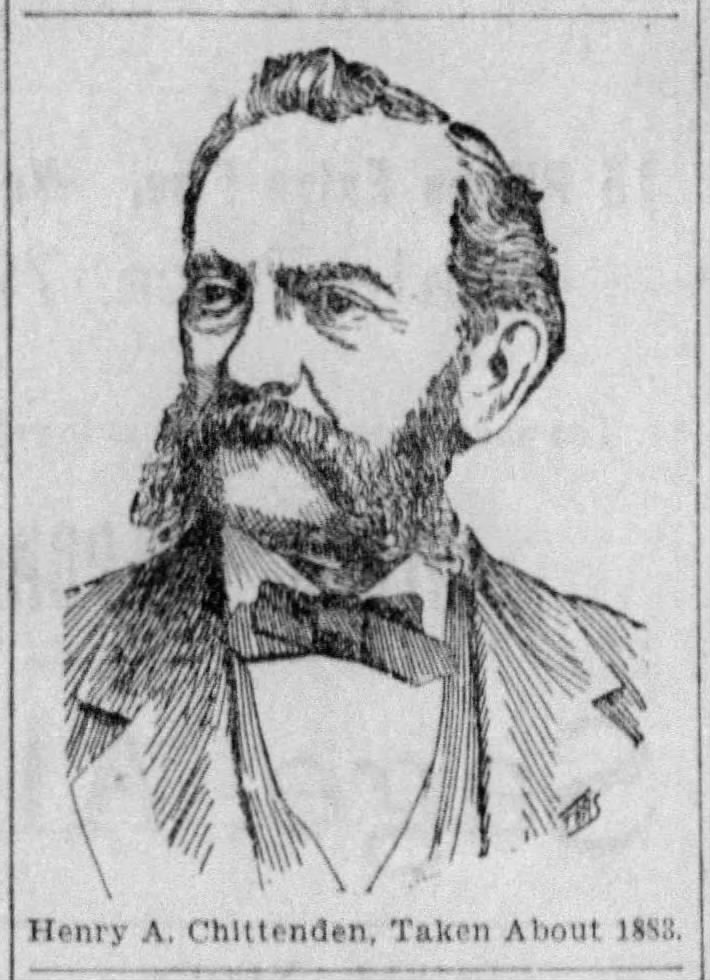
Henry Abel Chittenden (1883)

==== Daniel Gano Chittenden ====
Daniel Gano Chittenden (1852-1925) was a journalist, poet and theatrical performer. He was born in England to Henry Abel Chittenden (1816-1895) and Henrietta Gano, descendant of the Huguenots who founded New Rochelle, New York.

His father, Henry, was an abolitionist pioneer and a companion of Joshua Leavitt, Lewis Tappan, William Lloyd Garrison, Wendell Phillips, Frederick Douglass and Harriet Beecher Stowe. Henry played a major role in the Underground Railroad, nearly getting lynched in Baltimore for helping slaves escape to Canada. He co-founded the Plymouth Church in Brooklyn and encouraged, along with Horace Brigham Claflin and others, Henry Ward Beecher (brother of Harriet Beecher Stowe) to migrate from Indianapolis to the Brooklyn church. Henry was noted for his uncanny resemblance to Beecher. Daniel's uncle was Simeon B. Chittenden, a former New York Congressman.

In the early 1870s, Daniel's brother, Henry Abel Chittenden, Jr. (1846-1900), traveled to Milwaukee for his health to visit his college chum, James Greeley Flanders. Henry and James attended Columbia Law School together, studying under Theodore Dwight. While there, Henry purchased an interest in the weekly Milwaukee Journal of Commerce. Henry had already been a newspaperman in New York. After graduating Yale in 1867, Henry joined his Uncle Simeon's paper, the Brooklyn Daily Union. When Simeon created a morning edition, Henry became its editor, working in that role while attending law school. He spent a short time as an attorney at the Supreme Court of the State of New York. He then went to work at John Russell Young's paper, the New York Standard. It was after the Standard that Henry headed to Milwaukee. After getting a piece of the Journal of Commerce in 1871, his Yale classmate, William Henry Bishop, joined him, and they consolidated Henry's weekly paper with the Milwaukee Times in 1874 into a political daily called the Milwaukee Commercial Times.

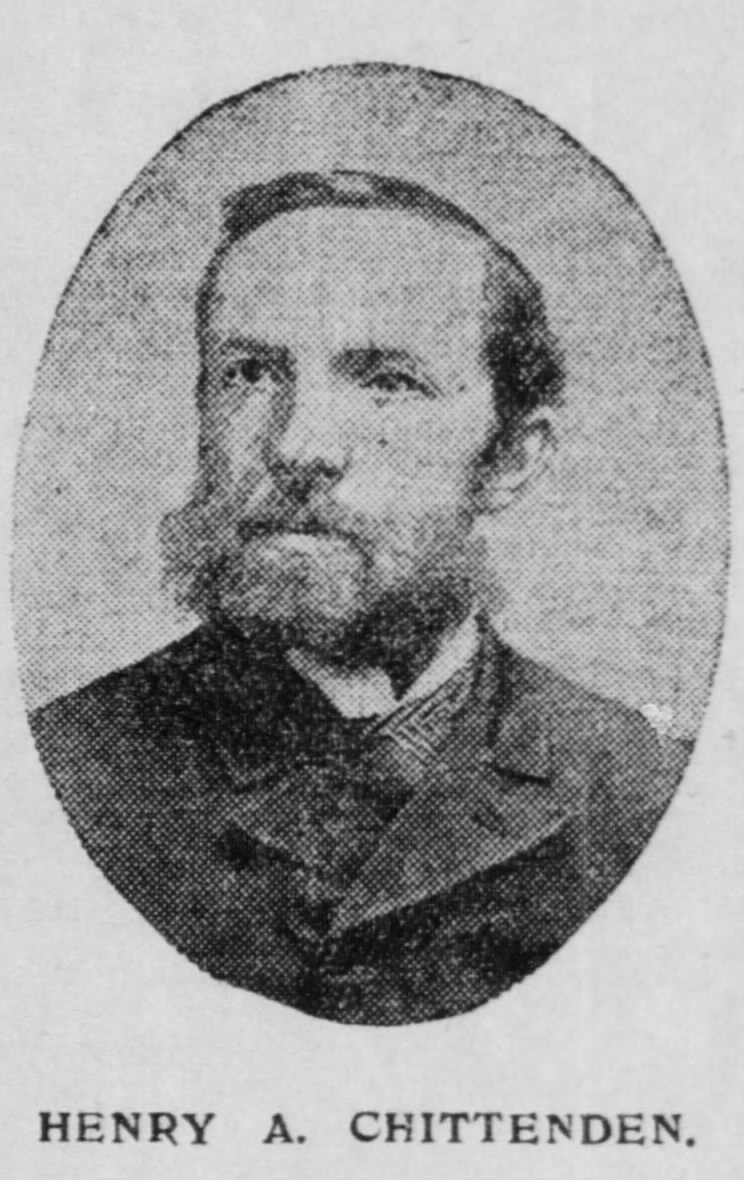
Henry Abel Chittenden Jr. (1900)

Sometime between Henry's arrival in 1871 and 1876, Daniel joined his brother in Milwaukee as a reporter and editor for his brother's paper. Whatever the Chittendens printed in their journals during early 1876 drove the competition violent. First, N. S. Murphy of the Milwaukee Sentinel assaulted Henry. The Times had printed a scathing attack on the Sentinel business manager's, W. G. Roberts, character. On Saturday, February 26, 1876, Roberts mistook Daniel for his brother Henry. He began beating Daniel with his cane. Upon learning it was not Henry, he backed off. Suddenly, George Moody, the Sentinel's night foreman, attacked Daniel for an article he penned about a member of Moody's family from which George took offense. Moody broke his cane over Daniel's head. A diminutive man, Daniel appeared incapable of handling the smallest of opponents, let alone the brawniness of Roberts and Moody. Witnesses regarded Roberts and Moody as dastards. The police finally stepped in, but not before Daniel landed a couple left-handers. Everyone was placed under arrest.

==== Anna H. Chittenden (a.k.a. Grace Courtland, the Witch of Wall Street) ====
During his time in Milwaukee, Daniel met local actress, vocalist and instrumentalist, Anna H. Loomis (1839-1919). She played piano, guitar and banjo and performed under the stage name, Grace Courtland. Anna also owned and operated her own theatrical company, the Grace Courtland Comedy Company.

===== Anna's early life =====
Her parents descended from the Nomadic gypsies of Great Britain. Her mother's family came to America and lived in the Mohawk Valley region amongst the Mohawk people and the Cherokee. Her paternal grandparents were of the earliest settlers of Vermont where her father was born. She was the daughter of Levi Goodrich Loomis (1806-1892) and Mary Hallet (1821-1854).

Levi resided in a young Chicago when there were only three houses in the entire city. In 1828, he migrated to Wisconsin. He arrived July 25 on the land which would eventually become Milwaukee. He is regarded as the first Anglo-Saxon to set foot in Milwaukee. Only a handful of scattered Potawatomi, Menominee, Ojibwe (Chippewa), Miami people and Wyandot people Wigwams occupied the land. Solomon Juneau lived in one of those wigwams. Levi briefly shared the wigwam with Solomon and even worked for him for a few months. Levi traded furs with the locals and learned to speak most of their languages. He even translated the Lord's Prayer and various hymns into Potawatomi to help the local missionaries.

By the late 1830s, Levi was living in Manhattan, Ohio (a defunct town at the mouth of the Maumee River whose land was swallowed up by the northward growth of Toledo, Ohio) with his wife Mary and two small children, one being Anna in her infancy. He operated a trading post which did business with the local Native Americans. which was how he met Anna's mother, Mary Hallet, who lived among them as a gypsy. The story is Mary fell into the Maumee while crossing a raft of logs, Levi rescued her, they fell in love and married two years later. When hostilities broke out between the Cherokee and Mohawk nations, he moved his family back to Milwaukee. He worked as a mason for some years before opening a pawnbroker's shop in Market Square in 1858. Per the 1860 census, he had amassed $26,000 in real estate and personal assets.

Her mother died October 3, 1854, having supposedly foretold her own death.

===== Anna Davis =====
Following the death of her mother, fellow actor Morris Davis persuaded Anna to marry him without her father's consent. Because she was 15 at the time, Morris had to claim to the minister that she was of age. Morris left the stage to start a store; however, he was addicted to gambling. His debts cost him his store as well as their home and furniture. With the little money she had, he moved her to New York City. By now, Anna wholly believed herself a clairvoyant, and provided Morris the winning numbers for a game of Policy. On the win, he swore off gambling to become a diamond broker on Broadway, introducing Alaska black diamonds (Carbonado) to the marketplace. He succeeded in this business, but did not give up gambling. He took to racetracks instead. William M. Tweed, James Fisk and others. He lost everything once more and began to beat Anna if she did not give him winning numbers. They had to sell everything and move to a cheap home. He left her to go fight in the American Civil War. Not long after, she returned to her father's home in Milwaukee. Morris rejoined her there after the war. Over time, they had four children: Leonard, Joseph, Caroline and Mary.

She grew concerned that Morris was at the gambling tables again so she applied to a theatrical company in Chicago. She did not want to return to poverty. The manager of the Globe Theatre was so impressed with her powers of clairvoyance and acting talents that he cast her as Camille in La Dame aux camélias (more commonly, "Camille"). They moved to the south side of Chicago in 1871 and escaped the Great Chicago Fire. From this, Morris took his Chicago inventory and moved them to Ohio where started another successful jewelry business with locations in New Orleans, Louisville and Memphis. Anna reentered high society in Ohio, often riding horses and sailing in a boat named for her. The demand for her clairvoyance grew more in demand. She successfully prescribed medications where physicians had given up on the patients. She used her powers to successfully aid the Chief of Police in apprehending criminals. Her predictions were no longer ridiculed.

A pair of men robbed the Columbus, Ohio Depot of the Adams Express Company on May 17, 1871. They stole between $45,000 in cash and goods out of the safe. Allan Pinkerton worked the case. He tracked down the perpetrators and recovered most of the goods in under two weeks. Theodore and George Washington Bradley (brothers) both confessed. One of the men told authorities he had sold solitaire diamond ear-drops worth $1,000 plus other items to Morris. Morris was charged. After quite the exciting trial, the juror found Morris not guilty of all charges.

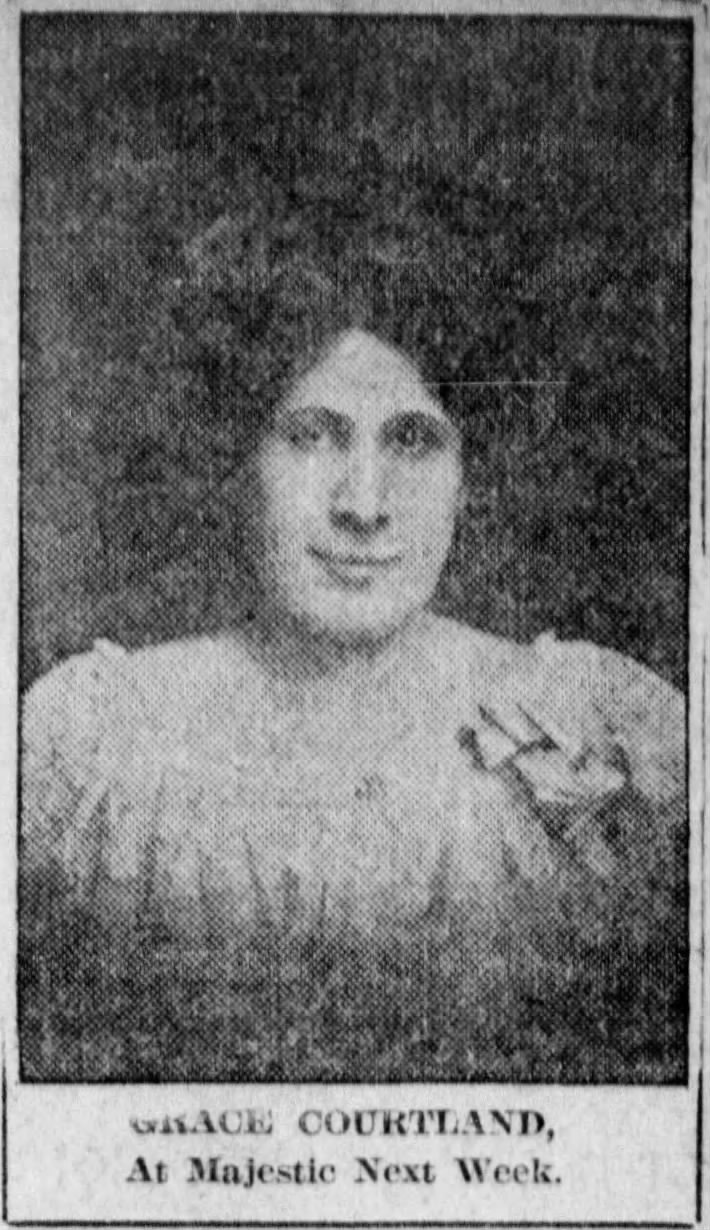
Grace Courtland (Anna H. Loomis Chittenden), also known as the "Witch of Wall Street"

Morris Davis never stopped gambling. He even bet on the election. Morris was an avid Democrat whereas, Anna was a Republican. Her marriage to him climaxed the night of the 1876 United States presidential election. Davis bet heavily on Samuel J. Tilden to defeat eventual winner, Rutherford B. Hayes. Election night arrived. At his behest, she cooked some of the food for the dinner at the Tilden League. Later on, she assisted a friend at the Hayes club, receiving local Republicans. She sang and played the piano and guitar for them. When she got home that night, he greeted her with bloodshot eyes impaired. He grabbed her hair and yanked her head back. He proceeded to beat her unconscious. His diamond ring left her with a gash dangerously close to her temple. She proceeded at once to her husband's attorney to pursue divorce. During the divorce proceedings, he did not show up to court. In the meantime, he settle his business affairs in Louisville, Memphis and New Orleans. He transferred all his property out his reach. He left her with nothing but debt and her four children.

After her divorce, Anna was offered lucrative opportunities to leverage her clairvoyance with physicians, police and scientists which she turned down. Anna returned to the stage and started her own company, the Grace Courtland Comedy Company. In particular, she played Margery in John Baldwin Buckstone's one act, The Rough Diamond. She met with success and credited it to her perseverance. Papers noted her fluid banjo playing talent. Even her son, Leonard performed with her as part of her company. Her company's members considered the touchstone of her success her clairvoyance.

===== Anna Chittenden and the Idaho =====
Anna married Daniel Chittenden during her stage recrudescence. She decided to go to Europe with her husband and take her talents with her. She disbanded her comedy company. She put her children in a school under the care of an old nurse friend. Anna and Daniel, along with her theatrical agent (likely Daniel Chittenden himself) and some stage friends, set off from Milwaukee to New York to catch a boat to England.

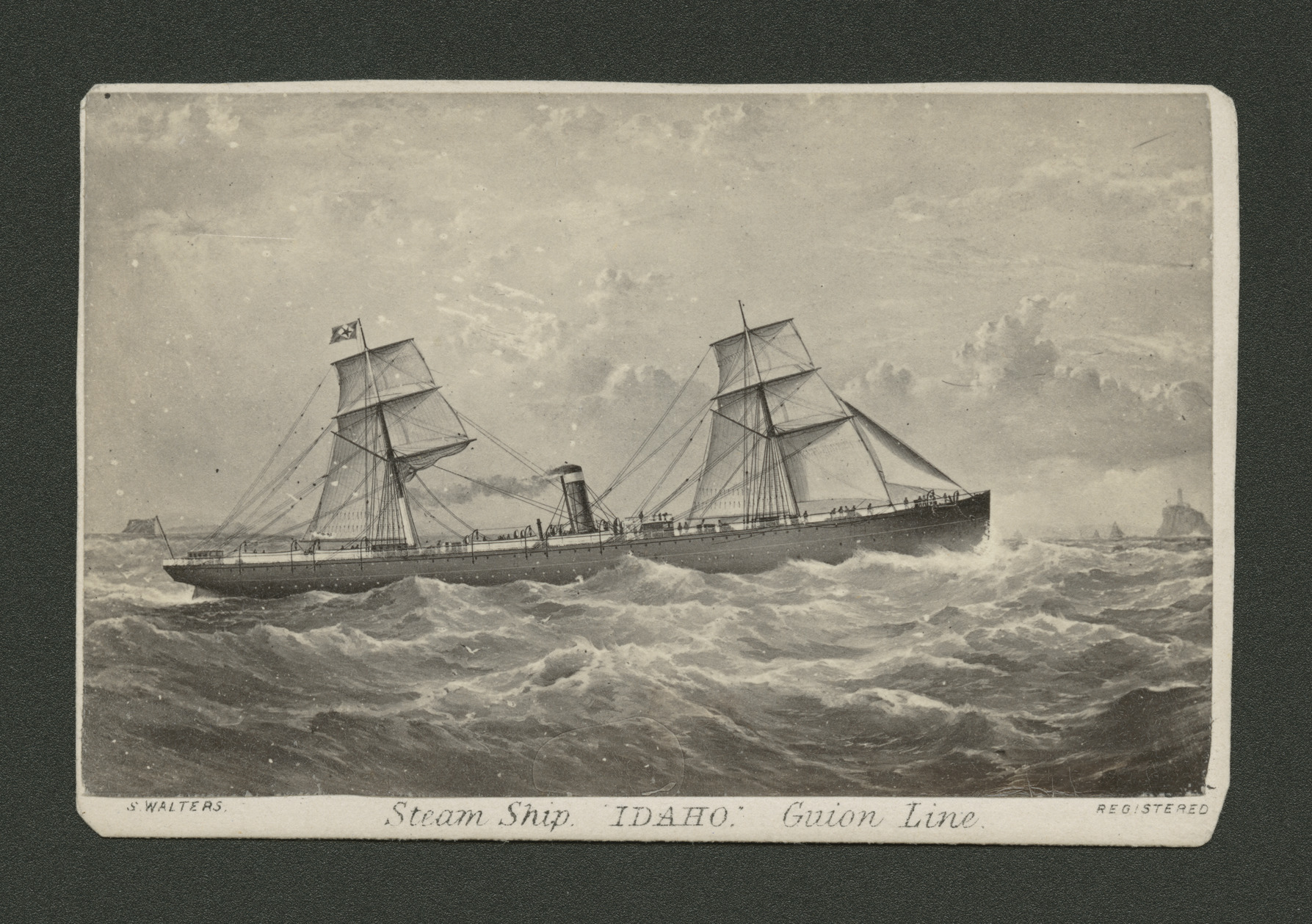
Screw steamer Idaho of the Guion Line.

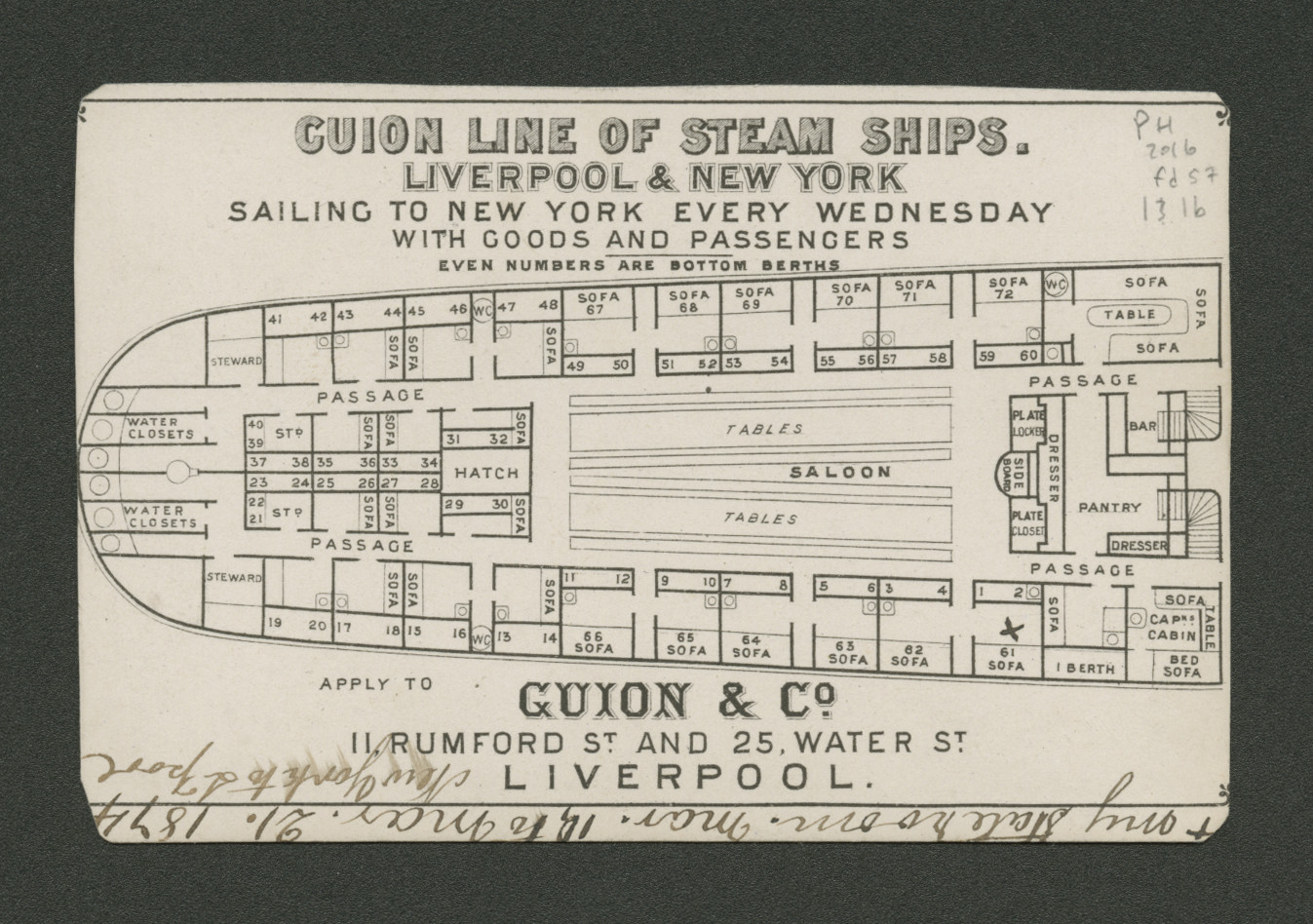
Living quarters of the Guion Line steamer Idaho.

The Chittendens boarded the steamship Idaho of the Williams & Guion Line at Pier 46 of the North River (Hudson River) in Manhattan on Tuesday morning, May 21, 1878. The Idaho departed at 9 a.m. for Queenstown, Ireland and Liverpool. She was in the charge of Captain William Holmes and his first mate, Mr. Attridge. 82 hands comprised her crew. Williams and Guion promoted Holmes to captain a year prior and the Idaho had been his first ship.

Owned by the Liverpool and Great Western Steamship Company, they built the Screw steamer, brig-rigged at the Yarrow Shipbuilders in Jarrow-on-Tyne in 1869. Made of iron, it weighed 3,132 tons and measured 345 feet long, 43 feet wide and 27 feet deep. It had five bulkheads and two connected engines. Her 600 horsepower drove her 13-14 knots. Considered of the fastest of the Guion Line, the American shipping survey rated her #1. She could handle 1,000 steerage, 30 intermediate and 45 saloon passengers.

Her ship's manifest delineated the following cargo:

- 1,901 Bales of Cotton
- 17,311 Bushels of Corn
- 12 Manufacturer's packages of Wood
- 94 Bales of Hops
- 12 Kegs of Printing Ink
- 75 Tierces (Casks) of Beef
- 141 Packages of Agricultural Implements
- 15,685 Bushels of Wheat
- 77,000 Pounds of Bacon
- 98 Packages of Clocks
- 2 Cases of Machinery
- 200 Tons of Fresh Meat
- 5 Pianos
- 58 Horses
- 47 Bags of Letters
- 35 Bags of Newspapers.

Her passengers (31 cabin, 20 steerage) included:

- Mr. & Mrs. Thomas Anderson
- Mr. & Mrs. James Bogan
- Mr. & Mrs. Daniel G. Chittenden
- Miss L. Cowley
- Mr. Marion F. Derby
- Mr. Peter C. Doremus
- Mr. William Duncan
- Miss Ellenson
- Mr. N. Freeman
- Mr. George Hanes
- Mr. J. A. Holden
- Mr. & Mrs. William Hargreaves
- Mr. John Jolly
- Mrs. Ellen Kearney
- Captain Midder
- Mr. D. Millan Keown
- Mr. S. D. Levi
- Mr. C. McDermott
- Mrs. McLane
- Mrs. Norman and Master Hulbert Norman
- Mr. James O'Rourke
- Mr. C. H. Pix
- Mr. William Roberston
- Mr. & Mrs. H. H. Shermeyer
- Mr. G. Sorrentino
- Mr. James Savage
- Mrs. Mary Sweeney
- Miss Minnie von Mahren
- Mr. & Mrs. John Watson (actor of Wallack's Theatre) and child
- Mr. L. A. Winship
- Mrs. M. P. Williams

Tuesday, May 21, 1878 - Saturday, May 31, 1878 - The Idaho departed for Ireland in dark gray skies and heavy rainfall. The Chittendens and their friends stood on deck under umbrellas waving goodbye to New York. As Anna reentered and made her way down the companion-way, she received a feeling of uncertainty. She had not fallen asleep that first evening when she claimed to have a vision of a steamship on a rocky ledge. Grace mentioned this vision to other passengers but laughed about it. Peter Doremus took her very seriously and claimed he had faith in dreams. She did not mention this vision again.

The vessel and her crew tackled fog and rain constantly. The waves rolled high throughout the voyage. The captain, for all intent, lived on the bridge for six of the days. The ship suffered in gale winds for two days prior to reaching Queenstown.

Sunday, June 1, 1878, 12:40 p.m. - The Idaho made port safely in Queenstown, Ireland. 14 passengers got off and the mail was unloaded. Anna considered asking Daniel to get off the ship her but, the sunshine changed her mind.

Sunday, June 1, 1878, 1:30 p.m. - The weather was clear and calm when they left for Liverpool. They passed Ballycotton and headed toward Coningbeg Lightship.

Sunday, June 1, 1878, 6:50 p.m. - Some passengers readied for the night in their cabins. Ladies partook in tea in the saloon. Anna headed down the stairwell toward the saloon herself when she claimed to get her vision again and announced, "The ship is fated."

A dense fog abruptly set in, thickening by the minute. Capt. Holmes compass malfunctioned, having been affected by the fog. The crew at the bow could not see the stern and vice versa. The tide was about an hour's flood and they spotted a dark object rising out of the water. Captain Holmes order the engines stopped and put in reverse, but it was too late.

Sunday, June 1, 1878, 7:10 p.m. - Suddenly, the ship hit Coningbeg Rock sideways. It ripped a hole in the bottom and thrust the vessel into deep water. it began to sink quickly between Coningbeg Rock and Brandies Rock, southeast of Great Saltee Island. The ship caught on fire.

Anna walked across the cabin when it jolted. People tumbled onto the floor, across tables and into doors. Mothers screamed. Children cried. Husbands yelled for wives. Everyone rushed the stairwell for the upper deck. It was crammed. Anna waited calmly in the back until a path cleared.

Black smoke and sparks rose from stack that was falling. The water flowing into the ship put out all the fires below.

Holmes ordered the crew to the davits to lower the lifeboats. Passengers rushed to the decks. Chaos ensued. A panicked woman attempted throwing herself overboard, but she was prevented. Another lady ran back and forth on the deck, pulling her hair out and pleading for the "Mother of God" to save her. The crew had to force a few others onto the boats.

Crew soon restored order. They only needed six of the eight available lifeboats. The crew tended to the women and children first. Captain Holmes had one of the ship's compasses installed on one lifeboat. Anna observed the water quickly moving up the deck. She moved to action. She grabbed and axe and cut one of the boats free rather than wait for the davit to lower. Holmes watched her in astonishment before leveraging an axe to free the last boat himself.

Sunday, June 1, 1878, 7:30 p.m. - Captain Holmes and the Chittendens boarded the final lifeboat. All passengers and crew were saved; however, everyone lost all their belongings beyond the clothes on their backs. The evening timing added contretemps to a number of passengers who were in dishabille. The cargo, cattle and horses went down with the ship. Those in the lifeboats listened in horror as the horses and cattle neighed and mooed on the way down.

Sunday, June 1, 1878, 7:32 p.m. - The ship sank stern first. It disappeared out of sight. Reports afterwards claimed the main mast could still be seen at low tide.

They rowed 1.5 miles for 4 hours toward Great Saltee Island. Anna rowed and sang songs to uplift the saturnine spirits.

Sunday, June 1, 1878, 11:30 p.m. - The captain fire distress shots into the air which lit up the water and boats. Mr. Parle, a farmer, and his family were the only inhabitants of the island. Upon spotting the 6 boats, they fired guns into the air and shouted in order to guide the boats into a creek where they could safely reach shore. The Parles did their best to accommodate the rescued. Several boats carried the party to Kilmore Quay the following morning. From there, they went to Wexford and boarded a train to Dublin. By 9 a.m., they were all on a boat for Liverpool, arriving at 7 p.m.

As for Anna, she lost everything on the Idaho. Willams & Guion refused any responsibility. They reminded her that she shipped her belongings at her own risk. She lost: wardrobe, jewels, letters of introduction, newspaper notices, lithographs and advertising bills. She arrived in Liverpool with nothing to get her started but her husband. The officers of the Idaho sent her an extravagant flower arrangement for her bravery with the axe. The accompanying note read, "A token of the courage, tact and presence of mind displayed in the hour of peril and danger."

Anna secured an engagement at Lord Nelson Street Concert Hall. A benefit concert was put on for her under the patronage of the American consul, Lucius Fairchild. The Guion Line and officers of the Idaho helped her sell tickets. Sam Hague and his pioneering company of black performers, which included Japanese Tommie, were lined up to perform with her. Other professionals were on the bill as well.

She published her autobiography, "A Marked Life; or, the Autobiography of a Clairvoyante", in 1879 under the pen name Gipsy. She proclaimed her "second sight" over and over within those pages. Upon her return to New York that year, she set up shop as a mesmeric physician and clairvoyant on Broadway with cures 20 years standing. She offered her services free to the poor on Saturdays.

She made her way to Philadelphia by the end of October 1879, advertising herself as a Wonder of the World and Mind Reader. She styled herself the London Mind Reader. Anna and Daniel were having problems by the end of 1879. He had moved home with parents in Montclair, New Jersey, while she was in Philadelphia. He took a job as reporter for the New York Evening Telegram. There had been no indication of a divorce; however, she secretly married 41-year-old Pennsylvania Railroad auditor, Benjamin Steel Rodgers, on December 30, 1879. He moved into her residence on 219 Ninth Street.

On New Years Day 1880, 19-year-old Mary Elizabeth Ash came to Anna to have her fortune told. Anna told her she only made note the impressions of the mind. She asked Mary questions. Mary answered. Anna worried a man called John Goff intended to take $50 from Mary and subject her to a dangerous medical procedure. Mary had spent the last five years as a domestic in his brother, Henry's, hotel. Anna wrote Goff that Mary would be overnight with her. Goff showed up to the door that same day. The couple had a conversation then left. Anna had her nephew follow the couple. He observed Goff dump Mary at Dr. John Buchanan's Eclectic Medical College of Pennsylvania where he was under investigation for selling fake medical diplomas. From there, Mary vanished. Anna reported it to the police. Rumors circulated fearing the worse. Goff was arrested from her parents demands and put on $600 bail. A warrant was issued for Dr. Buchanan's arrest as well but he evaded it.

On January 6, Michael Ash showed up to the magistrate to make an affidavit. He stated his daughter was pregnant. He alleged John Goff's brother, Henry, guided the girl to Buchanan's to secure an abortion. Michael and Anna Ash believed their daughter now dying or dead. Henry confessed his involvement to the Mayor. Detective Jackson accused Anna of delaying too many hours before informing authorities, thus, allowing for Buchanan's escape. Anna rebuked this in the paper the following day.

Goff made bail and disappeared. Two weeks later, Mary reappeared and returned to Henry Goff's house. She claimed she had been staying with a friend and seemed vexed by the rumors. She indicated a plan to take legal action against those spreading sensational stories, meaning Anna. It turned out Mary was a victim of Buchanan after all. They charged him with mail fraud. He got out on $11,000 bond, faked his drowning and fled to Detroit. They caught up to him and sent him to prison for ten months. Mary, due to the notoriety, was forced to live under an assumed name.

Anna and Benjamin were in the process of setting up house. She spent extravagantly and beyond his affordability. On March 30, 1880, while visiting a friends house, she heard someone sing and decided she must have a piano. Benjamin went to work the following day. He withdrew a month's salary, went to a saloon until 11 p.m., then vanished. Even his brother-in-law supported that Benjamin was uncommunicative and fickle. Whether Anna sought him, intended to open an office, went back to Daniel or some combination, she went back to New York.

By June 1880, Anna set up shop with the parlors of the Stevens House in Queens. She was arranging for a telephone installed to call her clients on Wall Street. Her notoriety as a seeress grew and notable clients mounted. Anna Elizabeth Dickinson was under guidance along with Fanny Davenport. Thomas Edison paid her a visit, but she frowned upon him as a know-it-all. When Lucius Fairchild sat with her in England, she predicted his appointment as envoy to Spain. Charles Darwin told her, "You are a wonderful woman but not a supernatural one." This was fine with Anna as she never claimed anything supernatural. Benjamin Disraeli complimented her on her powers. Other clients included Lady Stisted, Mrs. Carshore (the only lady to escape the Siege of Delhi), George Wyld (who supported Henry Slade during his trial), John Atkinson Grimshaw and many others in nobility and the military. Noted publisher, Aaron K. Loring, wrote a testimonial to her clairvoyant abilities. She talked business with Jay Gould and had many attorneys from Boston and New York visit her for her guidance. She admitted her impressions were not perfect, but she seldom erred when it came to stock and life predictions. She also claimed she could cure anything.

So many of her stock market predictions came true that she and her opinions became quite popular. When interviewed in September, she predicted the downfall of Jay Gould and the rise of James R. Keene as the new King of Wall Street. She completely discount Russell Sage and Deacon Rush R. Sloane, citing their foibles. She came away with a positive, friendly feeling about Jay when she met him earlier in the year. Now, her opinion swayed decidedly negative. She referred to him as cold, vindictive, hard and unpitying. it began a long campaign to strike down Gould.

Anna soured on the stage at that time in her life. She called the stage her foster mother. She declared, with the popularity of Hazel Kirke, if the stage represented the mental condition of the country that the nation was in a deplorable condition.

===== The Witch of Wall Street =====
For the first time, Anna became known as the "Witch of Wabash" for her predictions of Wabash Railroad stocks and the "Witch of Wall Street" for her stock and futures predictions in general. She credits Jim Keene for the sobriquet.

Her own story on the matter began with her struggling with two daughters. She noticed the wild fluctuations of Wabash stocks. She pretended, with herself, to buy and sell Wabash by using her far-seeing abilities. She won every time, so she went to Jim Keene's office. Anna had not a cent to her. Jim was at the very beginning of his celebrity.

He asked her what she wanted. She claims she told him that she wanted him to manipulate Wabash that afternoon as she dictated it to him and he would win. The men in the office thought it a complete joke. Keene pulled her up a chair and started reading stock quotes to her. As the numbers printed out of the ticker tape machine, she told him, "...buy, sell, buy, sell, buy, sell, buy,..." Again, she used only her predictive nature as her tool.

At the end of the session, Keene handed her a check for $500. Oh her exit, one of those present declared, "We must call her the Witch of Wabash." "No," Keene spoke up, "she is the Witch of Wall Street." The alias stuck and Anna copyrighted it.

She was hired as a financial editor at the Wall Street Daily News working with Charles H. Keep. She, under her stage and pen name, Grace Courtland, published an article which successfully predicted the results of a mad rush on Wabash Stocks.

Her predictions and advice made her well-to-do and popular. She toured the markets of Milwaukee (Fall 1880) followed by St. Louis, Chicago, Cincinnati and Boston in early 1881. Her son, Leonard, acted as her agent on occasion when she operated in a more theatrical capacity. She made predictions, gave speeches and created a great sensation of herself. She clearly reconciled with Daniel Chittenden as he, once again, acted as her financial agent.

She continued to hammer on Jay Gould. She honored him but said he would die of a soft brain. She frowned upon his scheme to swindle the government out of $250 million by consolidating the telegraph business and his attempts to purchase the Associated Press. She called him a one-man monopolist and considered former President Ulysses S. Grant under his thumb.

President James A. Garfield was shot by Charles J. Guiteau on July 2, 1881. Anna predicted he would die in spite of newspaper accounts of his good recovery progress. She travelled to the White House to see for herself. Doctor Willard Bliss precluded her access to the president or the first lady. In talking with his son, Dr. Ellis Bliss, she discovered Jay Gould and James G. Blaine used a cipher to pass messages back and forth with Ellis' father on the president's health, so they could buy or sell stocks accordingly. She exposed it and them in the New York Truth which she had begun writing for. She was the financial editor there under Joshua Hart. The president died September 19, 1881. To this day, no one knows if malpractice for the sake of the markets played a role.

Another faction grew steadily which shaped her as a fraud. They accused her of boring everyone in Washington to get a look at the president to make a prediction on his health. The Philadelphia newspapers commented on her claims of having earned $100,000 on prognostication activities. They put forth she was not worth 100,000 cents and counted on the gullible for her income. The implied Philadelphians drover her out of town. Another story emerged she attain Gould's cipher so she could work the markets and stocks for her own benefit.

For the next several years, Anna continued her campaign against the monopolists by writing and lecturing. She lived for a few months in the Astor House as the only woman there. It was her clairvoyant activities there which earned her the title, Witch of Wall Street. She even published her primary lecture, The Kings of Wall Street or The People vs. Monopoly, in which she excoriated Gould and William Henry Vanderbilt. She also returned to the stage as an actress and impersonator. She wrote and published stories in the paper. She wrote for Wall Street newspapers as well as the New York Truth. She even composed the music to John McCann's When the Leaves Turn Red and Fall.

Jim Keene paid her $1,500 to tour New England and the midwest, lecturing and prognosticating about stocks and politics. More importantly, she was to advocate him at the expense of Gould, Vanderbilt and the others. She favored punctuality. To make a lecture on time at Rich Hill, Missouri, Anna shipped herself and her daughter, Caroline, as livestock when no carriage seats were available.

Mary (or Mazie as the called her) got into trouble with a married man, William C. Jones, at a hotel in Milwaukee in July 1883. The hotel proprietor found out and kicked them out. Jones ran away and Mazie went to Chicago to be with Anna. Jones had just been arrested a month back for betraying the May Eviston, a society belle, who had had his baby, so he married her. Apparently, her brother, Jacob, held a shotgun to his head during the ceremony. Now, he got Mazie pregnant as well. Anna marched Mazie right back to Milwaukee and checked in to the Elizabeth Plankinton House. She bought a horsewhip, went to the Eviston mansion and cowhided Jones.

Mazie, 16, lived with her father, Morris Davis, in Milwaukee. Anna claimed Morris was still a gambler. Morris told Anna he paid $50 to the Chicago Daily Times for them to print the story so as to humiliate Mazie. He wanted Mazie to work in a laundry or even become a prostitute. Anna was furious with him. A month later Anna sued Morris for $1500 unpaid alimony. She threatened to sink him for receiving stolen jewels as part of the Adams Express Robbery in 1871. It was a sign of money troubles for her.

The cowhiding notoriety brought other things to light. The New-York Tribune debunked her as a board member of the New York Stock Exchange or the mining board. They stated that she pretended to have close relationships with Keene and many other notable persons. While on her tour of the midwest, an attorney encouraged her to sue Keene for $10,000. Keene brought in Thomas F. Byrnes to investigate. Keene produced the receipt that he paid Anna $1,500 in full which put an end to her litigation. This was another indicator of her money troubles.

The Chicago Tribune published on July 22 her success on the stage and as a lecturer was a decided failure. She played a disastrous star at their Grand Opera House in 1878. After her failures as a lecturer and operating in the semi-dramatic semi-society organization, the Parlor Reading Club, she was seen in the company of a young Daniel Chittenden, who claimed to be deeply in love with her but was only her business manager at the time. They then disappeared to London together.

In Topeka, Kansas, she demanded they advertise her for her dresses, diamonds and appearance. The called her a nuisance. This indicated more money issues.

===== Transition to dime museums =====
By October 1883, she was a dime museum attraction in the Bowery alongside a 4-legged girl, a woman handling two snakes, a young black boy covered in caucasian spots, a man with no epidermis so he could pull the skin about his throat up and over his face and a tattooed woman. A New York reporter confronted her daughters about the matter. Mazie refused to talk. Carrie was quoted, "I think Ma's crazy. In a dime museum! Wonder what she will do next. Us girls don't get a chance. Just as everything has quieted down, and we think we can go along and behave like other people, out comes mother in some new crank idea which brings us into notoriety again. I would like to go and see ma at the museum--with a big club in my hands." This showed a growing divide in the family. She said her presence in the museum was a matter of money. She told a Pittsburgh Post-Gazette reporter the management offered her $500 per week and that her payment of $.50/client went straight to them. The reporter did not believe her.

The dime museums piled up: G. B. Brunnell's Brooklyn Museum, Great Chicago Museum, the Bankrupt Store, St. James Hall in Buffalo (where she opened her engagement by throwing $25 in nickels into the crowd; this became a recurring tactic she used to attract clients), Austin and Stone's Dime Museum, Pittsburgh's Harris' Fifth Avenue Museum, Kohl & Middleton's Dime Museum in Chicago, Gregory's Dime Museum in St. Louis and others.

In spite, she still gave interviews to highlight all her most famous predictions: Garfield's death, the Idaho wreck, the shocking win of Iroquois at the 1881 Epsom Derby (the first American horse to win), the 1881 jump in grain prices, the Manhattan Elevated Railway deal and on and on. When asked why she entered the museum life in 1884, she claimed for the excitement. She no longer labeled herself clairvoyant but a Palmist.

More signs of Anna's money troubles emerged in Illinois in May 1884. Back when she was in Chicago, she gave her diamonds and jewelry to Mr. Tillotson and Mr. Fell to satisfy a $500 debt. She never paid back the $500, so they auctioned everything off. They were only able to get $325. C.E. Taylor attempted to sue her for $51 he loaned her but she had not paid back. The money got her from Chicago to St. Louis. The next day it was reported that her engagement in St. Louis had closed and she had gone to New York.

She had not been back in New York six months when her son, Leonard Saville Davis, wrapped up in a mess. Thomas F. Byrnes' detectives arrested him on July 10, 1884, for forging and swindling. He wrote letters purported on behalf of Benjamin Wood, Joseph Pulitzer, Albert Pulitzer and others, requesting theatre, train and steamboat tickets. Upon receipt, he peddled the tickets through his agents, Louis Staeger and David Lewinski.

Leonard, out on bail, was rearrested on July 20, 1884, for bigamy. He lured 18 year-old Kate Gilbert from Philadelphia to marry him in New York on November 18, 1878. She had his baby, Leonard, not long after. He was cruel to her and drove her and the child out of her home in 1881. With her living separately, he married Frances Olive Penfield (24) on April 18, 1883. He pleaded guilty in the New York Court of General Sessions on August 14 and sentenced to one year in Sing Sing.

Only one day after they sent her son up north for a year, she was in Philadelphia meeting with Adam Forepaugh about setting up shop in his dime museum. She sat with a Times reporter and credited herself with predicting the August 10 magnitude 5 earthquake which shook from Maryland to Maine (still the New York earthquake record). She said still had her Wall Street office, and emphatically, denied herself a Spiritualist or clairvoyant. She made predictions only.

As Anna headed back to the dime museums in late 1884 and 1885, her daughter did as well. Mazie began Fortune-telling in Milwaukee. Mazie declared she had married William Jones in a February 1885 paper, the man her mother horsewhipped, but they did not live together. However, she did not actually marry him until April Fools' Day in Chicago. He was 26. She was 18.

A new challenge emerged. People posed as her to make money. The police raided several fortune tellers and clairvoyants in Baltimore on April 8, 1885, for violating a local fortune telling ordinance. Three women were fined $25, one being Grace Courtland, The Witch of Wall Street. She could not pay the fine, so they locked her up. The problem was she was an imposter. Anna (Grace Courtland was her stage name) appeared in Boston with a card two days later which showed she copyrighted her name in Washington. Now, the woman in Baltimore was up for fraud along with her fortune-telling violations. In spite of this infringement and obvious vexation, Anna was at the Kansas City Museum less than a month later, working her craft.

Anna's popularity waned as the years passed. Her stomping grounds narrowed to Minnesota, Ohio, Missouri, Massachusetts (where she lived) and Wisconsin (where she grew up). She continued to lecture and give predictions, but she was reduced to nothing more than a simple dime museum attraction. On top of it, a number of women emerged as Wall Street witches for various reasons. Some came before and some after: Hetty Green, the Claflin sisters (Victoria Woodhull and Tennessee Claflin), Sophie Mattern (who had an affair with Russell Sage and sued him) who was famous for her tawdry display of her diamonds, Inez Walker Smith and Emma Abbott.

===== Chittendens buy Witch Island =====
On October 15, 1887, the Lewiston, Maine Sun Journal published a small piece of information they found in the Pemaquid Messenger:

The Pemaquid Messenger says Johns Island was sold, last week, to Bobert Haines, proprietor of Hotel Coburn, Skowhegan and others, who will erect and large hotel theron, next season. Davis' Island on the western side of the bay, was reported sold, Monday, to New York parties who will erect elegant buildings, in the spring.

The Monday mentioned would have been October 10, 1887 (A separate account has the sale finalized October 29, 1887.). This sale was made to Daniel and Anna Chittenden by Thomas Boyd, guardian of young William Davis who inherited it from his father. The Chittendens purchased the property with the intent of building an elegant summer home. The home they built stood one story and contained three 30x30 rooms.

While Anna busied herself buying a summer home, Bronson Howard wrote a new comedy, The Henrietta (originally, The Henrietta Mine), which he created with actors/impresarios Stuart Robson and William H. Crane in mind. It was set to open at the Union Square Theatre on September 26, 1887. It received spectacular reviews and was a hit. The play was a satire about love, money and Wall Street life. The principal character of the play, Henrietta, never makes an appearance; however through comedic intent, her character was confused between being a mining and railroad company, a chestnut race horse and two women: a ballet dancer and the Witch of Wall Street.

A noticeable slowing of Anna's business activities occurred in 1888. She even began showing up in the same billings as Mary Edwards Walker. By the end of 1889, she was doing an extended stay in Buffalo and getting herself back to the papers with her predictions. One of her noted predictions was Grover Cleveland's reelection in 1892. One reporter even asked her to opine on Jack the Ripper, for which she replied,

I believe he is an Englishman by birth, that he lives in America, yes, in Massachusetts, that to all appearances he is a gentlemen, speaks different languages, and is an educated physician, who has had some unfortunate things occur in his own family, which has made him hate women of a certain class with a hatred that amounts to fiendishness. He is a capable, attractive man and would do with his education for a professor of a medical college. He has been connected with The Salvation Army and is a prominent member of the YMCA. I believe he plays on the steamer between Europe and Boston or New York; there he commits fiendish murders and immediately takes the steamer for this country as a steward or officer; after a certain time elapses he returns there and continues his work. He has black hair, blue grey eyes, restless eyes they are, with a sweeping mustache, which ladies would call a beautiful mustache; he also has handsome teeth with a filling in the front one. He is left handed, uses his knife and pen with his left hand and I fully believe he has been to me for consultation, but I did not know him then. Now, I say I cannot prove these facts, but I want you to watch these things I have said.

Bristol tax reports in the 1890s list the Chittendens had two cottages on the property valued at $700.

===== First known reference to Witch Island =====
Martha Moulten Keezer (nee Whittemore) penned an article of the newly anointed Witches Island in the September 8th, 1890 edition of the Boston Evening Transcript:

Among the many summer sojourners returning home to their fall and winter duties is one whose mode of spending her vacation is as odd and interesting as is the name in which she earns her livelihood. The "Witch of Wall Street" is the name given her, for it is by her advice and caution that much of the business transacted in that famous New York street is made successful for one man and disastrous to another.

Brokers go to her for counsel; bankers seek her out and ask her aid; speculators in particular court her favor, and place utter confidence in her judgements, and act accordingly. Yes; unknown to their friends and families, they consult with her and depend for much of their worldly success on this far-seeing woman.

And for all this advice and predicting she demands a "pretty penny," and always gets it. Her income is large, and with it she has afforded herself a most unique privilege-that of buying an island on the Maine coast for her own especial resort.

The island, now known as "the Witches Island," is almost entirely covered with a growth of beautiful birch trees, in the midst of which the owner has erected a pretty cottage. The place is attractive in every way, and that the witch is not at all bitter towards outsiders is shown by the cordial manner in which she waves her flag or handkerchief to the parties sailing about the home. On certain days in the week the flag flying from the top of the house signifies that she will tell the fortune of or otherwise inform any who will come ashore, and undoubtedly her summer profit is quite a little, for it is hard to withstand the charm that seems to surround such a woman. Besides that, it is a novel and somewhat unusual thing to catch a glimpse of the home life of a woman who cares to spend her time alone in a place where she is obliged to be her own gardener, fisherman and workman in general. But, undoubtedly, from this quite life during a few months she obtains strength and help for her regular work.

Marth Moulten Whittemore, West Roxbury, Massachusetts, Saturday, September 6, 1890

Whether the Whittemore piece boosted her sanguinity or the island or some other undocumented occurrence, she published a poem via the Buffalo News less than a week later titled September:

A shadowy veil is gathering on the hills,

The autumn winds are stealing from the South;

The thirsty pastures drink the lazy rills

Where butterflies are winging merry rout.

The thistle down is drifting on the breeze,

And misty cobwebs fill the dreamy air;

The faintest blush of nature in the trees

Hath flamed the golden aster's hair.

In stubble fields the garnered wheat

Bespeaks the fruitful harvest o'er,

Where burdened branches bend to greet

The sweeping orchard's wasted store.

In leafy groves the locust's call

Is answering to the drone of bees;

The flowers are fading, and the fall

Is creeping o'er the upland leas.

The Whittemore piece is the first known reference to the island as Witch Island, although in the article as Witches Island.

===== Anna's career slowdown =====
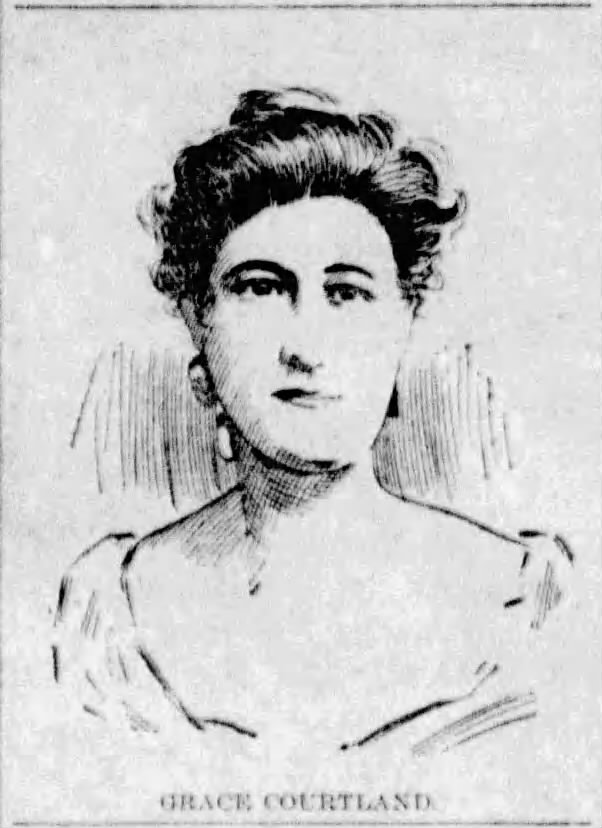
Anna Chittenden, Kansas City Times, 1901

The 1890s saw her appearances slow. Anna entered her fifties. She was an established dime museum curio, albeit ostensibly popular in the places she set up shop. She worked a great deal in Buffalo and Boston, but continued to make time for the midwest.

Anna continued to write and would occasionally send an opinion to a paper. Her friend, Anna Elizabeth Dickinson, entered an asylum in 1891, and Anna sent a piece to The Boston Globe censuring the government over it.

It was reported in 1893 that she bought ten lots in the Budd Lake area of Harrison, Michigan, with the intent of building a residence by the Detroit Free Press.

Confusions ensued as well with the "Witch of Wall Street" title getting associated with others. First, Anna used the stage name Grace Courtland. Grace Cartland, the actress and theatre manager, was confused with Courtland quite often. Anna, who claimed to have copyrighted "Grace Courtland" and the "Witch of Wall Street", heard of this and demanded she change her name. Grace did not want to be associated with the "Witch of Wall Street", so she established herself as Grace Hawthorne. The confounding continued from the 1880s into the 1890s.

As a side note, an 1884 The Pantagraph note also showed that some considered Anna as a deadbeat, sensationalist and crank. They remarked she had diligently pestered their own town for weeks. In other words, the viewed her as a fraud and nuisance.

Hetty Green was also often referred to as the witch of Wall Street. Whereas Anna received the alias due to her proverbial powers, Hetty attained it for her eccentric, crochety behavior. There was nothing Anna could do about the very wealthy and powerful Hetty so, not note ever printed on it.

Also, local references emerged over and over. An 1888 Boston Globe edition contained a note from Anna threatening prosecution for someone at Austin and Stone's Dime Museum using her copyrighted name. Madame Dr. McKnight arrived in El Paso, Texas, sporting the moniker in 1892. Madame LeHoen, the "Witch of Wall Street", appeared at the Corvallis Opera House in Oregon in 1893. Katie, the "Witch of Wall Street", appeared in Ohio in 1898. La Belle with the same in Portland in 1898. In Vermont, Madame H. M. Beaumont carried the label in 1901. There were more, and in all sorts of places. It recurred with such frequence that Anna began putting in her advertisements "The Only Witch of Wall Street".

After spending the summer at her cottage on Witch Island in 1895, Anna told the Portland Evening Express that she had great faith in Maine real estate. People visiting Witch Island to get a prediction became common in the summer of 1896. She generated some mystery about herself when she told some of her patrons she could not see for them through "their" dark cloud. A Silverite went to her cottage to goad her into commenting on the free silver movement. She predicted an utter rout of the silver advocates including Maine's own Arthur Sewall.

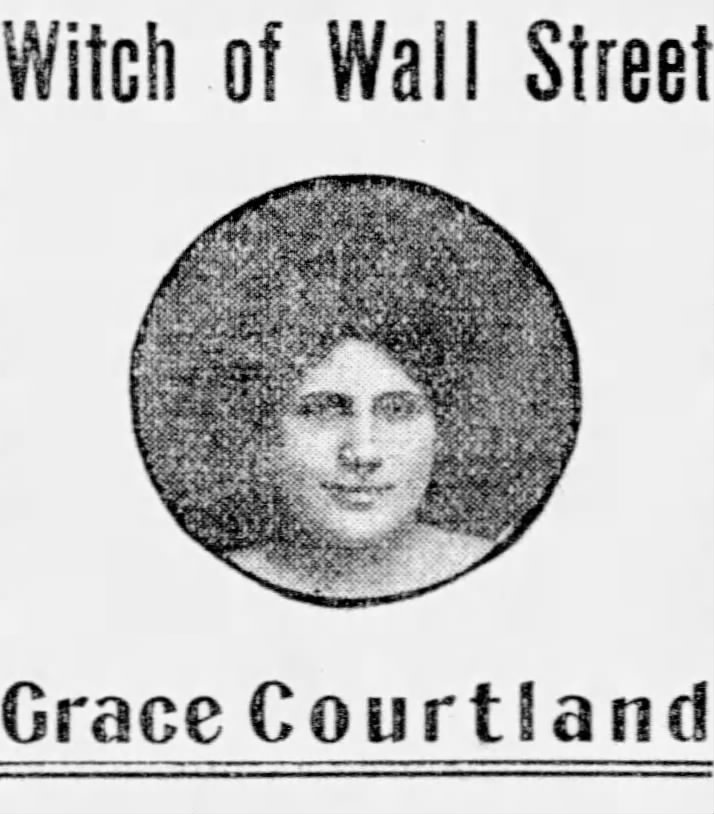
Anna Chittenden, Fort Worth Telegram, 1908

Her engagements and travels up through the turn of the century reduced noticeably. Buffalo, Detroit, Chicago, Cincinnati and her hometown, Boston, were regular stops for her. She did travel as far as Texas, and began appearing in Maine.

1897 - Detroit

1898 - Boston, Detroit

1899 - Detroit, Buffalo

1900 - Buffalo, Boston, Cincinnati

1901 - Boston

1902 - Boston, Portland

1903 - Boston

1904 - Detroit, Missouri, Maine

1905 - Texas

1906 - Texas, Oklahoma, Kansas, Boston, Pennsylvania

1905 and 1906 appearances in Oklahoma and Kansas were likely by imposters, as Boston and Pennsylvania reported her being local to them at the same time; however, it was symbolic she was nationally known.

===== Uncle Dan, flea remedy and song =====
While at Wonderland in Buffalo in 1899, Dan corroborated his wife's abilities: "Frequently have I seen Russell Sage asking her advice at the old Astor House. It was Grace Courtland (Anna) who predicted the remarkable success of James R. Keene when he was losing a hundred thousand dollars at a deal. Keene came to New York from California with a fortune and at once plunged into stock speculations. He made money then a turn in his fortunes came and he went broke. It was a while he was on the down grade that Grace Courtland surprised everyone with this unexpected prediction. She said it would not be fulfilled, however, until after Jay Gould's death, and she was right..."

During 1904, Daniel (ostensibly without Anna) spent time in Florida where uncovered at solution for household fleas. The flea solution was published in the New York Sun on April 11, 1904, and the very first time the papers referred to him as Uncle Dan. He got the solution from a local trapper and alligator hunter:

"You can drive them out with a rattlesnake," he said. So John Alligood and the writer (Chittenden) sought out his snakeship in the Blackjack Swamp not far from Carrabelle, Florida. Our first hunt resulted in a nine foot rattler, with seven rattles and a button, indicating his age at ten years or more. This we brought home, and after careful skinning, I dragged the snake about our home, leaving his mark on the white sand. The fleas at once left the place, the remedy proving so efficacious that with one more snake, seven feet in length, I have succeeding the place of every flea. The bodies of the snakes are buried fifty feet from the house and the fleas refuse to cross the dead line.

He wrote a song for Florida from Maine the following summer called "The Sailor Boy's Goodby".

===== Death of daughter, Caroline =====
It was November 25, 1906, in Bellevue, Ohio. A couple was found dead in a room of a lodging house. When authorities forced the door open, a strong smell of formaldehyde gas was detected. The initially ruled it a double suicide. Upon further investigation, they determined James Scott Mitchell drugged his wife until she was dead then, killed himself by the same means. The couple travelled around the United States for a number of years. Mitchell's wife was a palmist who worked under the stage name, Ollie Courtlandt.

While working in Bucyrus, Ohio, some months prior, the Mitchells contracted with a printer for some work. The printer completed the order, but could not pay. Mitchell, a Scotsman, claimed to receive $150 every three months from an estate. The printer did not get paid. This indicated the Mitchells had money troubles.

Mrs. Mitchell was actually Mrs. Caroline Davis Mitchell, Anna's daughter. She married Mitchell 10 years ago against Anna's wishes. She hardly heard from her daughter in the 5 years up to the murder/suicide. This was because Mitchell threatened Anna that she would never see Carrie again. Two weeks prior to the tragedy, Anna and Daniel offered them to live with them on their farm on Witch Island. In fact when they were first married, the couple lived in South Bristol, Maine, near to Anna and Daniel's residence on Witch Island. Just before the tragic event, Daniel had correspondence with Mitchell. The Chittendens sent them money. Anna received postcards from Carrie looking forward to seeing her mother soon. Then, they received the telegram they were both dead. Anna was instantly prostrated and cried constantly.

Carrie's brothers were brokers. Joseph was in Chicago and Leonard lived in Boston. Mazie, Anna's daughter Mary, had become prominent in Vaudeville as Kemochi the Magician.

Anna and Daniel had just moved to Boston after living, primarily, in New York for the prior 5 years, short of spending summers on Witch Island. Her primary theory was Mitchell had an alcohol problem. The man was down on his luck, got drunk, murdered Carrie then committed suicide. She never toured the country to dime museums ever again, and her local appearances dropped to a bare minimum.

A year later, she was reportedly taking clients at the Oxford County, Maine, fair in South Paris, Maine, in a dimly lighted nook.

===== Uncle Dan's Witch Island fish story =====
A fish story was published in the Lewiston, Maine Sun Journal on August 11, 1916, sourced from Dan Chittenden. Quoting directly from the article:

One of the best stories of the season as arrived from South Bristol, where D. G. Chittenden, whose veracity has never been questioned, saw a Horse mackerel pull a big motorboat and three captains thru the waters of John's Bay at high speed for a half an hour. "Near the red spindle of Covert's ledges, just off Witch Island," Chittenden says, "Capt. Thomas Brackett, Capt. Fred Brackett, with Capt. Lon Blaisdell, sighted a school of horse mackerel. They are old time fisherman and had their experience as boys out of the harbor at Round Pond. Grabbing a harpoon, they picked out the monstrous leader of the school and with the first throw landed it in his blue back as he broke water. He darted away, taking the big motor boat across John's Bay at high speed. After half an hour he came to the surface. The boys knew just what to do. They hit him on the head with an iron bar. He put up a great fight, but they got half hitch round his tail and with the aid of volunteers finally landed him in the boat. He tip the scale, according to the best judgement, at between 600 and 700 pounds. Before he died another member of the same school showed near the boat. It took only a few minutes to release the gear and bury the harpoon in the second fish, who sounded and then shot away with the boat for the open sea. After a run of some miles, he was hauled aboard. In the same fashion the captains caught four more big Mackerel. Other fishermen soon joined the sport and landed a dozen horse fish before dark. The smallest weighed over 500 pounds. The fisherman cut off the heads filled the bodies with ice and shipped them to market covered with burlap."

This story was repeated many times in papers across the United States over many years.

===== Rowland buys Witch Island =====
Per tax records in Bristol, the Chittendens' tax report showed their property appreciated to $1,000. For nearly 30 years, Anna's foretelling abilities and behavior earned her the reputation, positive or negative, as the mistress of Witch Island.

Roland's son, Henry, documented any success Anna had had on Wall Street in the past did not appear as such in 1916. This may or may not indicate the Chittendens had come into more money issues which obliged selling Witch Island.

Four months after Uncle Dan's renowned fish story, he and Anna sold Witch Island to novelist, Henry C. Rowland, at the beginning of December, 1916.

Anna died in Manhattan on April 20, 1919. W. A. McPherson Real Estate Company of Portland brokered the deal. Rowland, who had visited the area a short time before the purchase, authorized McPherson to negotiate an agreement with the Chittendens.

With the deal struck, Rowland provided McPherson with plans for a new summer estate. The Chittendens' summer home would be kept and used by Rowland for a studio.

The Chittendens were not leaving the area, though. They purchased a home on the mainland of Maine. Dan had many adventures in his travels in the Wild West, and apparently had quite the collection of curiosities he packed up and moved to the new residence.

Anna died in 1919 in New York and Daniel followed her in South Bristol in July 1925.

=== The Rowland family (1925–1964) ===
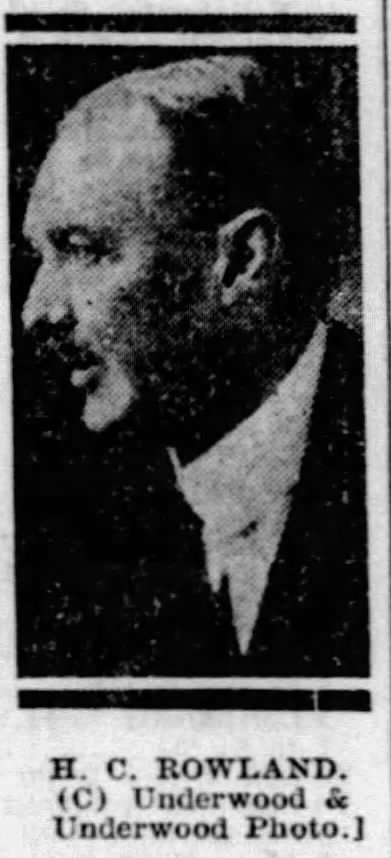
Henry Cottrell Rowland

==== Dr. Rowland ====
Dr. Henry C. Rowland (1874-1933) was born in Brooklyn and a descendant of Edwin D. Morgan, Civil War Governor of New York. He attended private schools in Connecticut and graduated from Yale Medical College with an M.D. in 1898. He entered the Navy and participated in the Philippine–American War and the Spanish–American War. He practiced medicine in New York briefly before heading to Paris to become a writer. In 1910, he married Mary Fulton Parkinson (1875-1942), daughter of a Kansas City, Missouri judge, in London. They had two children: Henry and Diana.

Just prior to the U.S. entry into World War I, the Rowlands purchased Witch Island from the Chittendens as a summer home. The added to the home the Chittendens already had there. The current building Henry intended to use as a studio. Old records indicated two cottages, but there was reference to only one now. The overall house was of a camp style and they used it in the summer months, beginning in 1917, some six months after their purchase of it.

This camp style home was designed for summer living as well as work. It was perfect for Rowland who was a tireless yachtsman. The family did spend summers there and brought their maids as well. They also had a number of pets: Airedale Terrier, Dachshund, Pomeranian, two white seals and a tame Crow.

When World War I broke out, Rowland went back to France to serve as an intelligence officer and a surgeon. Upon his return, he went back to writing. He was seen, with his family, in Witch Island after he came back from France. He had made 7 round trips to France since the war began.

In his career, Henry wrote more than 50 novels, short stories and magazine/newspaper serials. A number of his stories became silent films: The Sultana, Bonnie, Bonnie Lassie, The Peddler of Lies, Duds and Conquering the Woman.

==== The Rowlands move on ====
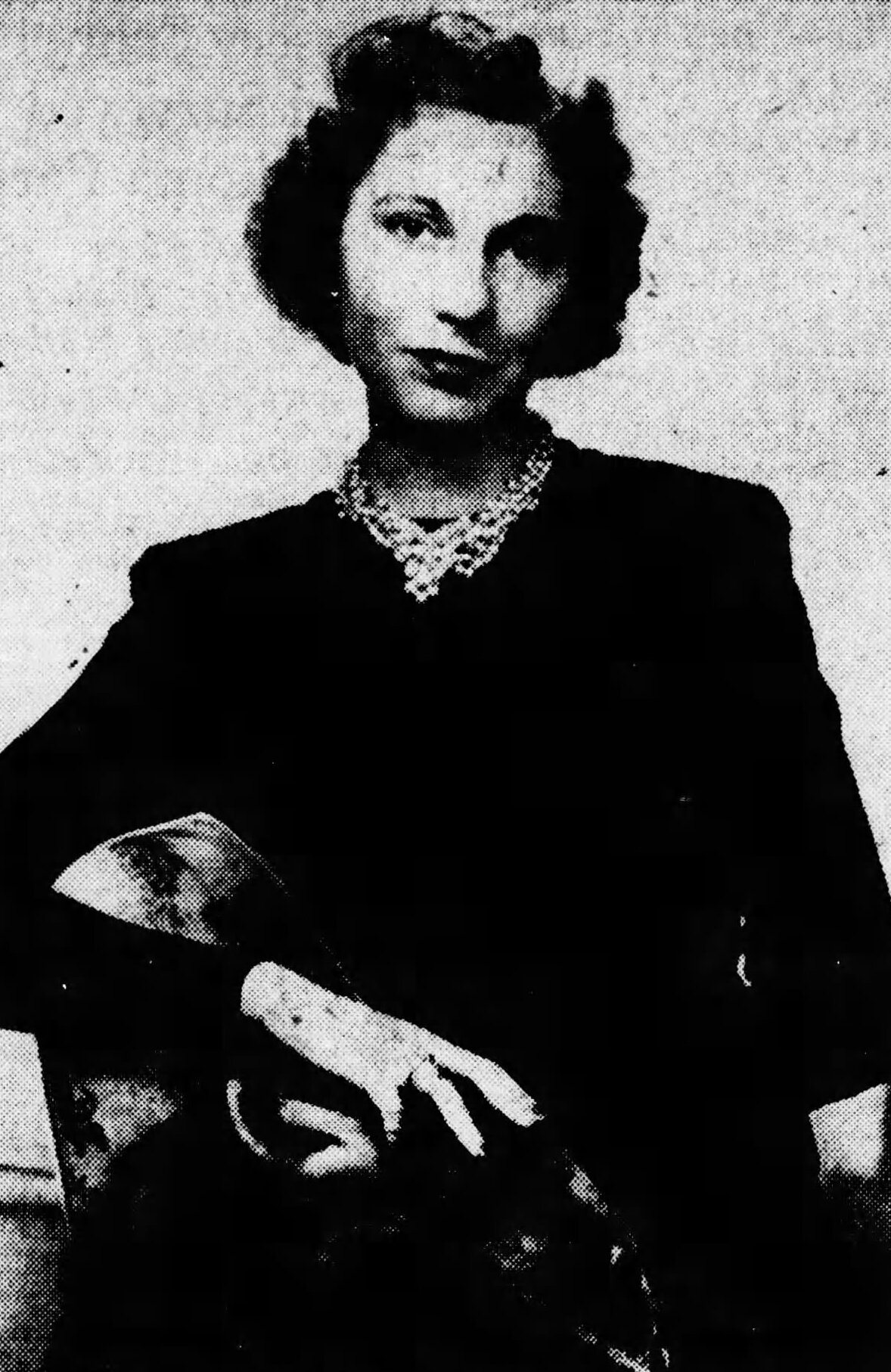
Diana Rowland Proddow, 1942

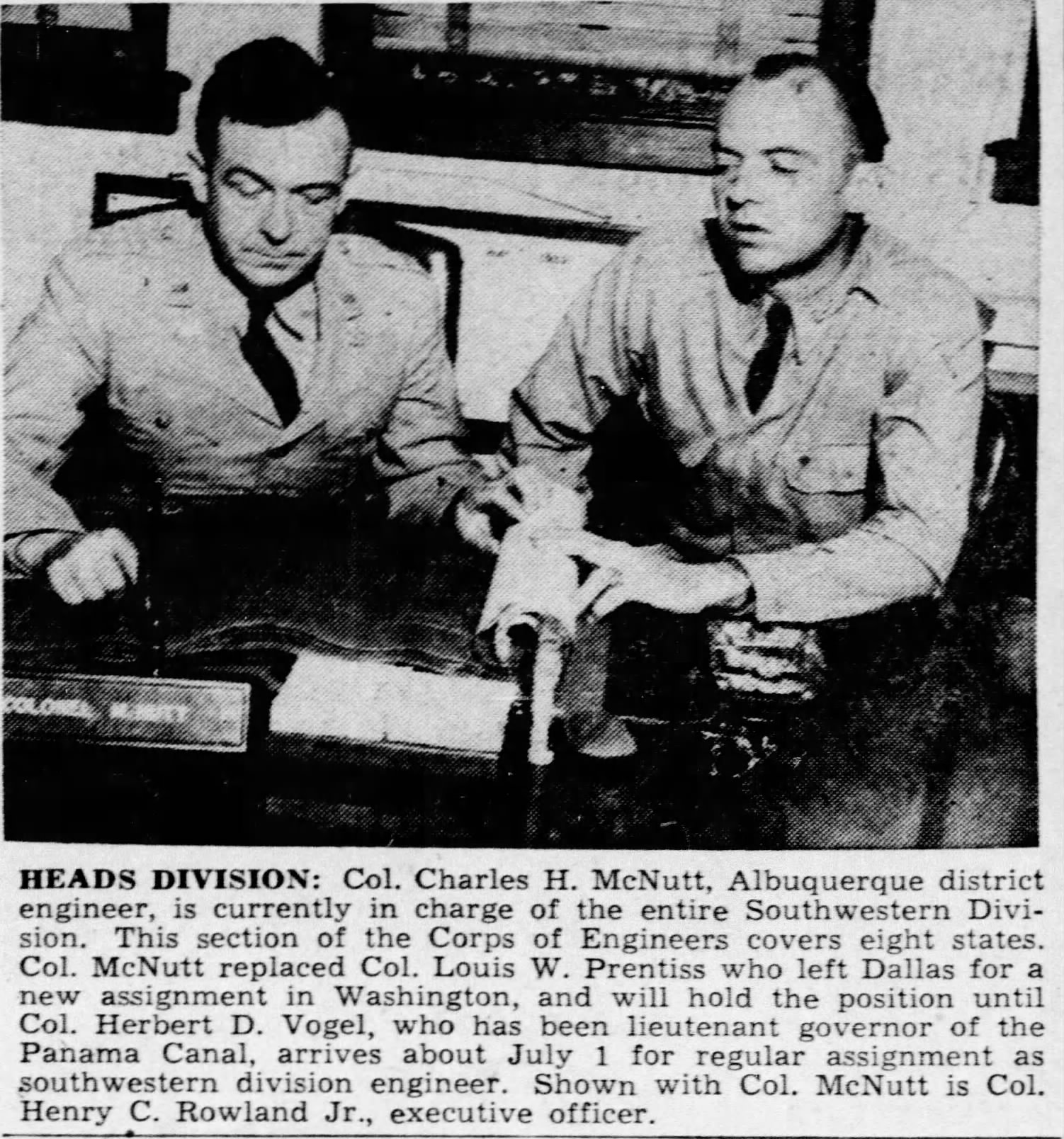
Col. Henry C. Rowland, Jr. (right), 1952

Henry died in 1933, but Mary and her daughter, Diana, continued to use it as summer home and entertained there. In fact, after spending a summer on Witch Island, Mary presented her daughter, Diana, to society at tea on November 21, 1934. Mary died in 1942, passing along the island to her son and daughter.

On December 22, 1948, the United States Coast and Geodetic Survey submitted 23 Maine place names for verification by the Board of Geographic Names. One of those was Witch Island, which was no longer Davis Island.

==== Witch Island sold again ====
Diana Rowland Proddow, who now lived with her husband in Fairfield, Connecticut, and Col. Henry Cottrell Rowland Jr., who was serving with the Army abroad, sold Witch Island to South Bristol resident, Jane Sewall of South Bristol, on June 6, 1964.

=== Jane Sewall (1964–1986) ===
Jane Sewall (1936-2001) was born in Cleveland, Ohio. She a was descendant of the well-known Sewall family of Maine, dating back to the family's arrival in Maine from Massachusetts.

She attended at the Buffalo Seminary, all-girls private school. They called her Janie. After graduating, she initially attended Bryn Mawr College before eventually graduating from Goucher College with a degree in philosophy in 1960.

Her father, John Ives Sewall (1905-1975), was an art history professor at the University of Buffalo for 20 years before retiring to South Bristol, Maine. He graduated from Williams College and received his doctorate in philosophy from Harvard. His most notable work was A History of Western Art, published in 1953. It was nearly 1,000 pages. Her parents, John and Betty, owned property in South Bristol, some just across the water from Witch Island.

Her grandfather, Charles, great-grandfather, Albert, great-great grandfather, Jotham, and great-great-great grandfather, Jotham Sr., were all ministers. Jotham Sr. was known as "Father Sewall", lived into his nineties and was one of the first documented American vegetarians. His son, Jotham Jr., published his memoir for the press in 1853 which briefly lays out Jane's lineage to Henry Sewall, Mayor of Coventry, England.

Jane purchased Witch Island from the Rowlands, June 6, 1964. She recalled rowing in Johns Bay around the island as a seven-year-old, taking in the hardwoods and wildflowers. She enjoyed walking the trails and picnicking in her youth due to the proximity of her parents's home in South Bristol. Her sister, Kate Beaudette (née Sewall), said Jane "wanted that island more than anything else in the world." The island had been abandoned for a number of years. When the Rowlands put it up for sale, she jumped on it.

When Jane took possession of the island, the Rowland/Chittenden home had been vandalized. She had the existing structures demolished and built a small house west of the cove on the southern end. She moved into the home to live quietly alone./v

In a 1965 letter to the Portland Press Herald to discuss trespassers on her island:

I want to answer the letter of the people who wanted to have a picnic on a certain beach.The owners said they were trespassing. The people insisted on staying there. The owners threatened to call the sheriff and everyone was mad.

I am sure if you had introduced yourself to the owner and explained how much you were looking forward to coming there, he would have been glad to let you come. Instead, you have barged ahead without any thought for the owner's feelings and given yourself the reputation for being pushy and unattractive people.

I think I understand the owner's point of view, because I live on an island which was abandoned for many years, and all sorts of people used to come there. In all honesty, I do not want to walk around my island and run into people all the time. I really want to be left alone. Nonetheless, I have a great sympathy for people who would like to sneak around, enjoying my wildflowers, birds and animals, and if people with such quiet interests would like to come, I would be pleased to have them.

The difficulty is that many people come without having intentions of this sort. They think your land is given to them in order that they may behave in a totally undisciplined fashion on it. They want to yell and scream and laugh. They want to throw rocks and smash things. They are careless with their cigarettes and they build campfires in places where they are likely to set your woods on fire. They trample on your delicate plants and frighten the wildlife, and worst of all, they frighten you because you do not know what further acts of violence and destruction they are about to indulge in.

If land owners could be sure that the people who come to their land were peaceful, gentle people, who would leave everything just as they found it, I do not think land owners would make such a fuss over trespassers. If you, the visitor, would make it clear to the land owner before you come, that you will be one of those quiet people, you would probably be welcome.

==== Frustration with beach fires ====
She had grown weary of visitors to her island setting fires. It concerned her that her little island might burn to at the hands of some reckless people coming to her beaches to enjoy a picnic. She hung a sign which read, "No fires please." By 1970, she placed numerous signs and left off the "please." Jane demonstrated courtesy when it came to visitors ignoring her wishes. She wrote that she had a very strong caretaker who drove his boat by her island every day, who was quite capable of throwing violators into the bay. She continued to have frustrations with fires in 1978 where closed out a letter to the editor of the Maine Times with "If you love islands, you will bring your sandwiches made ready-made to eat, and you will leave your matches at home.

==== Donation to Maine Audubon Society ====
In 1978, Jane entered the Maine Tree-Growth Tax Program, citing she had no intent of ever cutting a tree on Witch Island. The program provided tax shelters to land owners with forests who would not develop their land. The state made changes to the law which targeted owners leveraging the law as a tax dodge. Of the changes, owners with 10 to 100 acres, which Witch Island was part of, would be required to conform to accepted forestry practices to grow trees with eventual commercial value.

Sewall said she did not want to follow these practices but could not afford to leave the program. She admitted embarrassment at only paying $10/year in property taxes for Witch Island. The island was valued at $15,600 in 1977, but, after assessment in 1981, revalued at a whopping $168,000. The new penalty clause would cost Jane $33,200. Back taxes on the island were $3,000. Without an amendment to the 1981 changes, she would be forced to pay the penalty (which she had not the money for), handing 1/3 of Witch Island to South Bristol to get sold or giving in to the new forest practices.

==== 1/3 of Witch Island to a non-profit ====
Jane released approximately 1/3 of Witch Island to the non-profit, Maine Coast Heritage Trust. The benefit property occupied the western third of the island. She did so on October 20, 1983. The release was officially filed on October 31, 1983. One could easily surmise they planned to file the transaction for the portion of Witch Island on Halloween with a bit of humor.

With the passage of the Tax Reform Act of 1986, tax brackets got lowered which would make donations less valuable. Jane donated Witch Island to the Maine Audubon Society for a sanctuary in the October 29, 1986. Like the prior transaction, Jane donated Witch Island just in time for Halloween, maybe with a smile. She did this to beat the December 31 deadline in order to maximize her donation. Eleven lots got sold or donated in 1986, including Witch Island, totaling $1.4 million.

The Maine Audubon Society had three offers for land donations in 1986. They accepted only one: Witch Island. Jane loved her island and wanted it protected forever. "I've been looking for a long time for institution to keep my island forever and ever," she said; "I care so much about the place, I want to keep it beautiful. I'm very grateful that Maine Audubon will make a sanctuary out of Witch Island so, I can still go back there."

Jane Sewall died in 2001.

=== Maine Audubon Society (1986–2009) ===
The Maine Audubon Society managed Witch Island for over twenty years. They released Witch Island in its entirety to the Damariscotta River Association, non-profit, on July 23, 2009.

=== Coastal Rivers Conservation Trust (2009–present) ===
Ten years after attaining Witch Island, the Pemaquid Watershed Association, non-profit, merged into the Damariscotta River Association on April 1, 2019. With the merger, the Damariscotta River Association changed its name to the Coastal Rivers Conservation Trust.

Coastal Rivers Conservation Trust continues to manage the island today. The island's beaches are a popular place for local kayakers to land and relax. About a half-mile of hiking trails loop around the island. Jane Sewall's cottage still stands on the western side of the southern cove. Every other year, elementary school children attend science camp on the island to perform basic science experiments and develop and appreciation for nature.

Many of the hikers use the twigs and bark found on the island's trails to create miniature "Witch Houses," similar to those found on Monhegan Island.

Since the island is a sanctuary, it remains uninhabited.

== See also ==
- List of islands of Maine
