= Henry C. Rowland =

American novelist

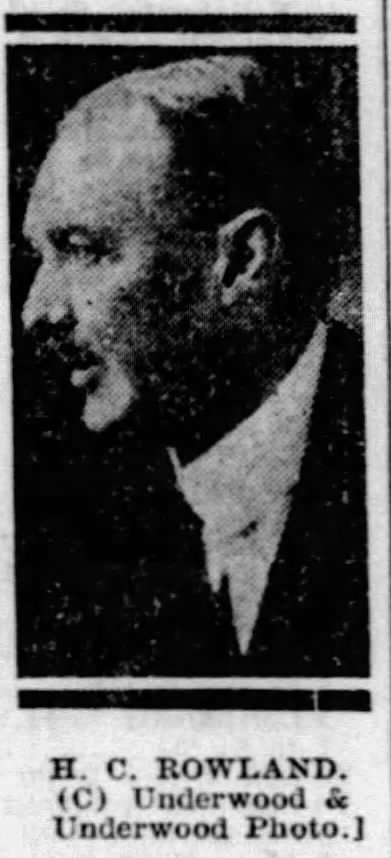
Dr. Henry Cottrell Rowland, Surgeon and Author

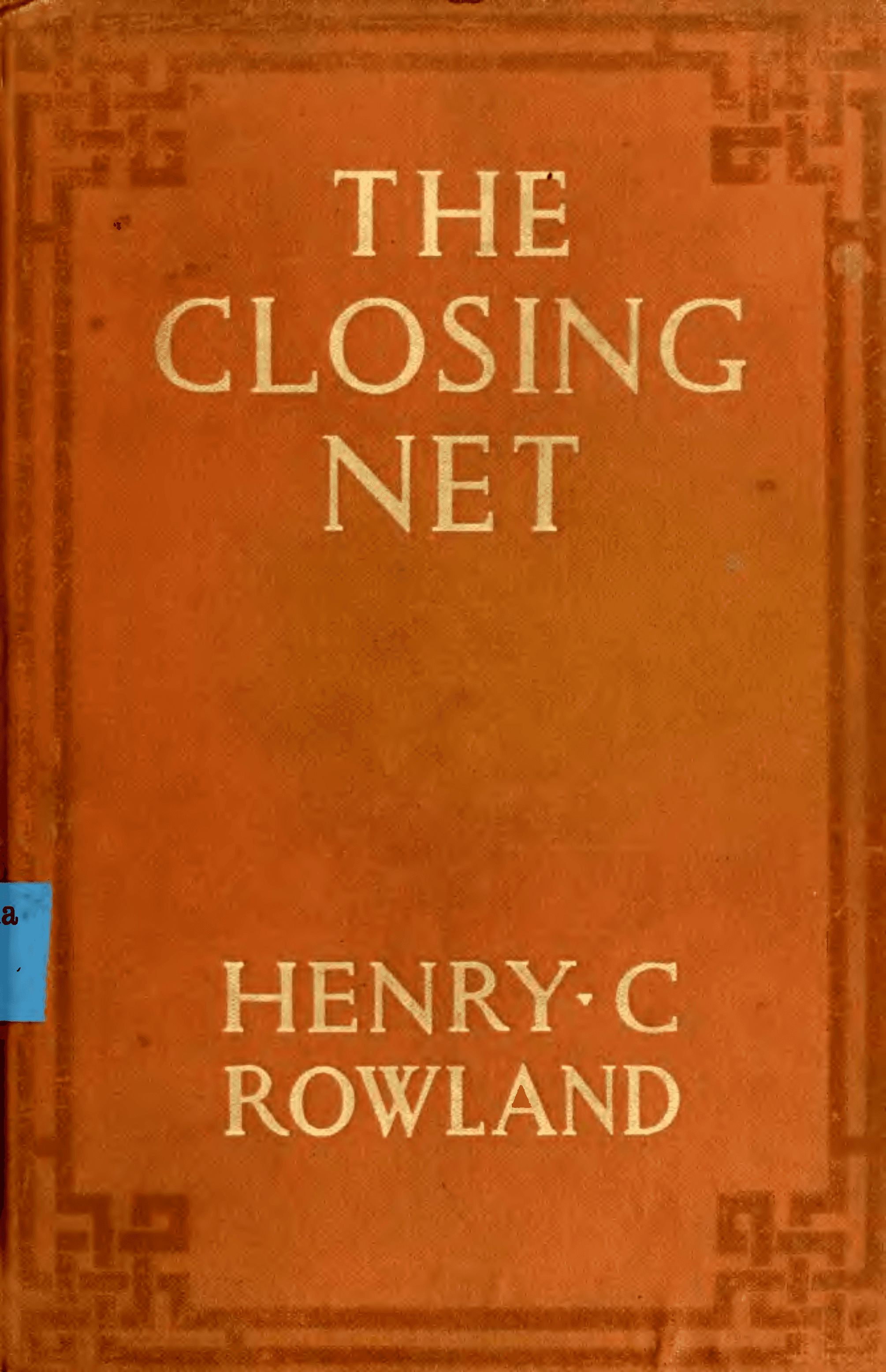
Front cover of The Closing Net

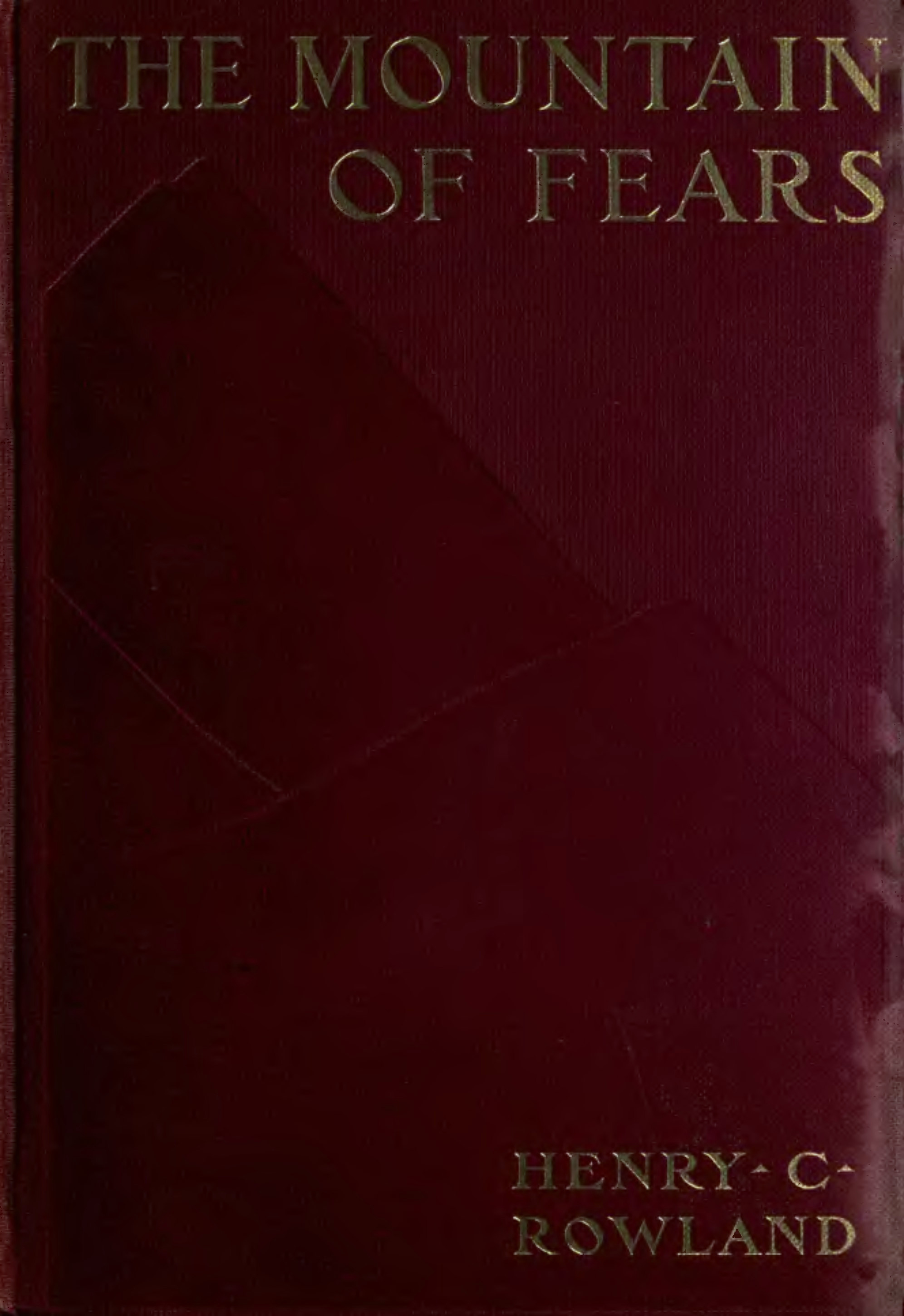
Front cover of The Mountain of Fears

Front cover of In the Shadow

Dr. Henry Cottrell Rowland (March 12, 1874 – June 6, 1933) was a surgeon and writer. Several of his works were adapted into films. He was also a co-producer on films. He wrote stories for magazines and novels. Several of his works are illustrated.

== Bibliography ==
- Sea Scamps: Three Adventures of the East (1903)
- The Bamboula (1904)
- The Wanderers (1905)
- The Mountain of Fears (1905), short stories
- In the Shadow (1906)
- The Countess Diane (1908)
- Germaine (1910)
- The Apple of Discord (1913)
- The Sultana (1914) with illustrations by A. B. Wenzell
- In the Service of the Princess (1910)
- Of Clear Intent
- The Closing Net (1912)
- Filling His Own Shoes (1916)
- Pearl Island (1919)
- Duds (1920)
- Hirondelle (1922)
- Many Mansions (1932)
- The Luck of Smalley
- The Magnet; A Romance (1911), initially published as a serial titled "The Pilot-Fish"
- Mile High; A Novel (1921)
- To Windward: The Story of a Course, illustrated by Charlotte Weber

=== Short stories ===
- The Forest of His Fathers (1920)
- The Trees (1932)
- The Merle

== Filmography ==
- Duds (1920) based on Rowland's novel Duds
- The Peddler of Lies (1920) based on Rowland's The Peddler
- Bonnie, Bonnie Lassie (1919), credited as one of the writers
- The Sultana (1916) based on Rowland's story of the same name
- Conquering the Woman (1922), based on his short story "Kidnapping Coline"
