= Conquering the Woman =

1922 film directed by King Vidor

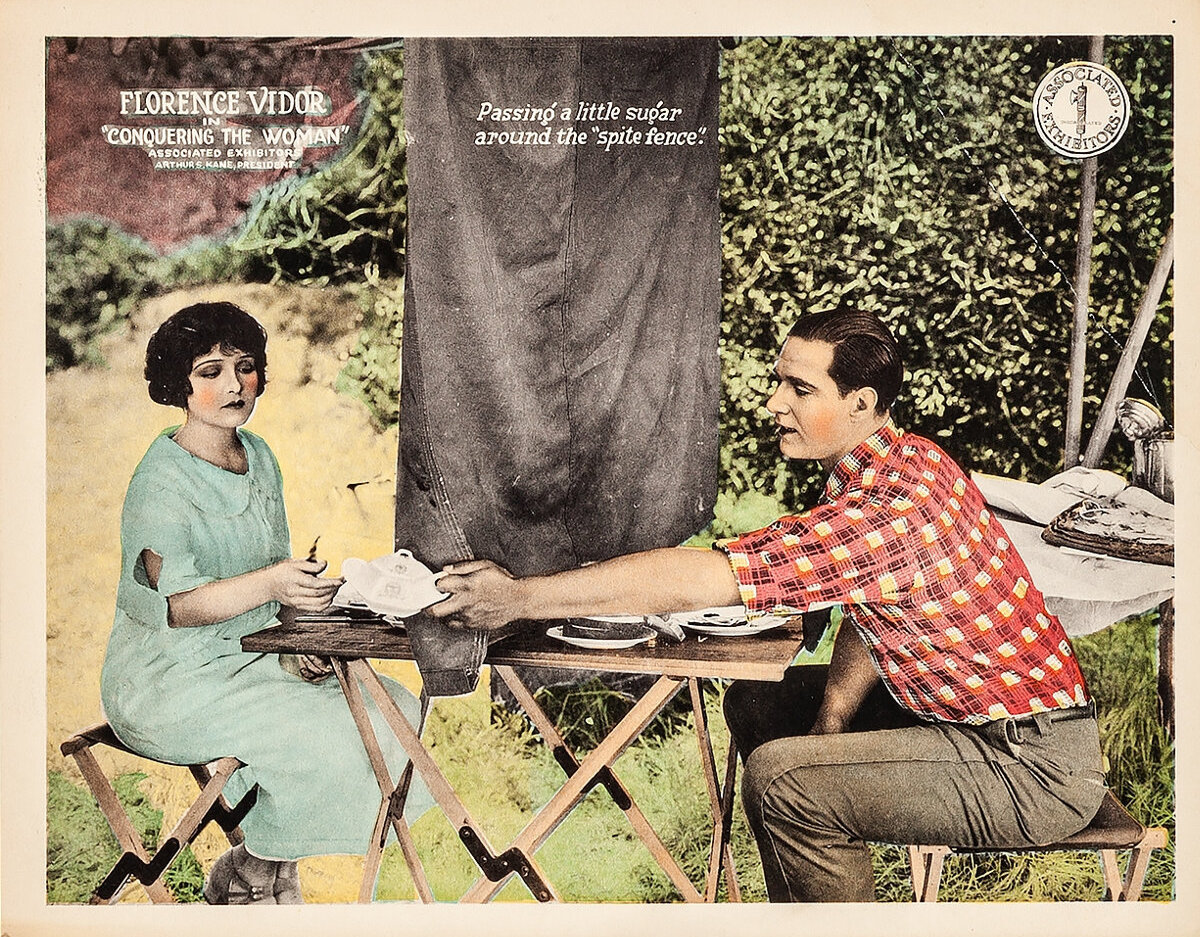
- Lobby card
- Directed by: King Vidor
- Written by: Frank Howard Clark
- Based on: "Kidnapping Coline" by Henry C. Rowland
- Produced by: King Vidor
- Starring: Florence Vidor
- Cinematography: George Barnes
- Distributed by: Associated Exhibitors
- Release date: December 10, 1922
- Running time: 6 reels
- Country: United States
- Language: Silent (English intertitles)

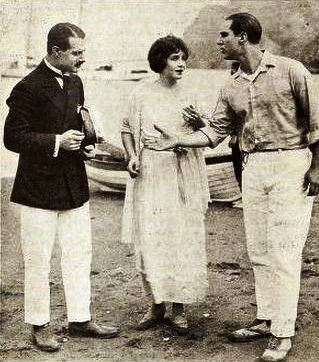
Scene from the film.

Conquering the Woman is a 1922 American silent drama film directed by King Vidor. A print of the film exists at the Cinematheque Royale de Belgique in Belgium.

== Plot ==
As described in a film magazine, Judith Stafford (Vidor) returns to her San Francisco home after a lengthy sojourn abroad during which Aunt Sophia (Brundage), a social climber, was her chaperon. While aqua-planing off the south coast of France, Judith intentionally falls off her plane and is very much annoyed when Larry Saunders (Butler) of Oklahoma, whose yacht is nearby, dives to her rescue. Judith berates Larry and she swims to the boat of her host, Count Henri (Burke). Later, when Larry comes to San Francisco, he visits his old friend Tobias Stafford (Sprotte), and is amazed to discover that Judith is Tobey's daughter. Judith becomes engaged to the Count. Her father opposes this match and tricks her and Larry on board one of his merchant ships. He gives Captain Sandy MacTavish (Todd) certain orders which result in Judith and Larry being marooned on an uninhabited island in the South Seas. Larry tries drastic means of taming Judith but is unsuccessful. He adopts gentler but persuasive methods and wins. Judith is happily in love with him. The Count turns up unexpectedly and kidnaps Judith. Tobey arrives and he and Larry start in pursuit of the abductor. After a thrilling chase, Judith is rescued by her lover.

== Cast ==
- Florence Vidor as Judith Stafford
- Bert Sprotte as Tobias Stafford
- Mathilde Brundage as Aunt Sophia
- David Butler as Larry Saunders
- Roscoe Karns as Shorty Thompson
- Peter Burke as Count Henri de Marcellus
- Harry Todd as Sandy MacTavish

== Production ==
The third of four pictures that Vidor and his spouse Florence Vidor (a rising actor at Paramount Pictures) had contracted to film for Associated Exhibitors, all of which were completed in 1922. Vidor considered the film “out of my line.” Vidor was unable to complete the final film of the contract, Alice Adams, as his marriage to Florence was deteriorating. He arranged for Rowland V. Lee to handle the direction.
