= The Sultana =

1916 film by Sherwood MacDonald

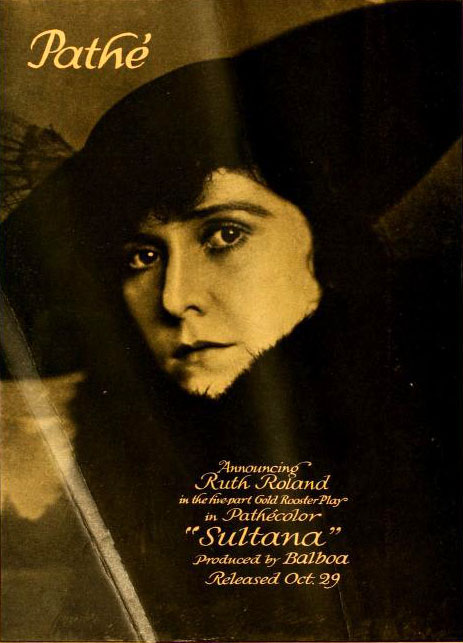
- lobby poster
- Directed by: Sherwood MacDonald
- Written by: Will M. Ritchey
- Based on: The Sultana by Henry C. Rowland
- Produced by: Balboa Amusement Producing Company
- Starring: Ruth Roland
- Cinematography: William Beckway
- Distributed by: Pathé Exchange
- Release date: October 14, 1916
- Running time: 5 reels
- Country: USA
- Language: Silent...English titles

The Sultana is a lost 1916 silent film crime drama directed by Sherwood MacDonald and starring Ruth Roland. It was produced by Balboa Amusement Producing Company and distributed by Pathé Exchange.

== Cast ==
- Ruth Roland as Virginia Lowndes
- William Conklin as Dr. Thomas Mills
- Charles Dudley as Peter Fulton
- Frank Erlanger as Durand
- Daniel Gilfether as Willoughby Kirkland
- Edward Peters as Gregory Kirkland (credited as E.T. Peters)
- Ed Brady as Count Strelitso (credited as Edwin J. Brady)
- Gordon Sackville as Captain Rimbert
- R. Henry Grey as Robert Sautrelle
- Richard Johnson
