= Duds (film) =

1920 American film

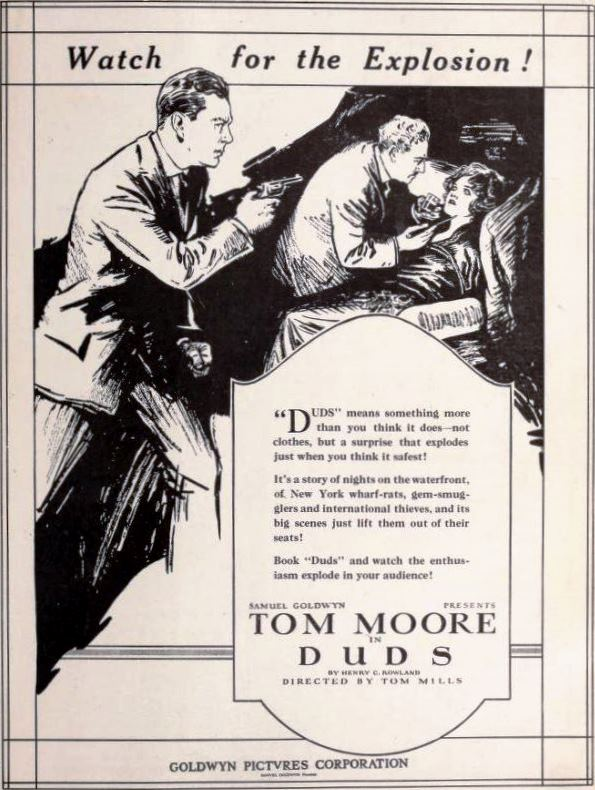
- Advertising of Duds on page 99 (inside back cover) of the March 27, 1920 Exhibitors Herald.
- Directed by: Thomas R. Mills
- Written by: Harvey F. Thew
- Based on: Duds by Henry C. Rowland
- Starring: Tom Moore; Naomi Childers; Christine Mayo; Edwin Stevens; Lionel Belmore; Edwin Wallock
- Cinematography: Otto Brautigan
- Production company: Goldwyn Pictures
- Distributed by: Goldwyn Pictures
- Release date: February 22, 1920
- Running time: 5 reels
- Country: United States
- Language: Silent (English intertitles)

Duds is a 1920 American silent mystery film directed by Thomas R. Mills, and starring Tom Moore, Naomi Childers, Christine Mayo, Edwin Stevens, Lionel Belmore, and Edwin Wallock. It is based on the Saturday Evening Post story of the same name by Henry C. Rowland, which became a novel shortly before the film was released. The film was released by Goldwyn Pictures on February 22, 1920.

== Cast ==
- Tom Moore as Phoebe Plunkett
- Naomi Childers as Olga Karakoff
- Christine Mayo as Patricia Melton
- Edwin Stevens as Karakoff
- Lionel Belmore as Rosenthal
- Edwin Wallock as Durand
- Clarence Wilson as Jues
- Milton Ross as Slater (as H. Milton Ross)
- Betty Lindley as Helen Crosby
- Florence Deshon as Marquise
- Jack Richardson as Pat's Pal

== Preservation ==
Duds is now considered to be a lost film.
