= The Peddler of Lies =

1920 film directed by William C. Dowlan

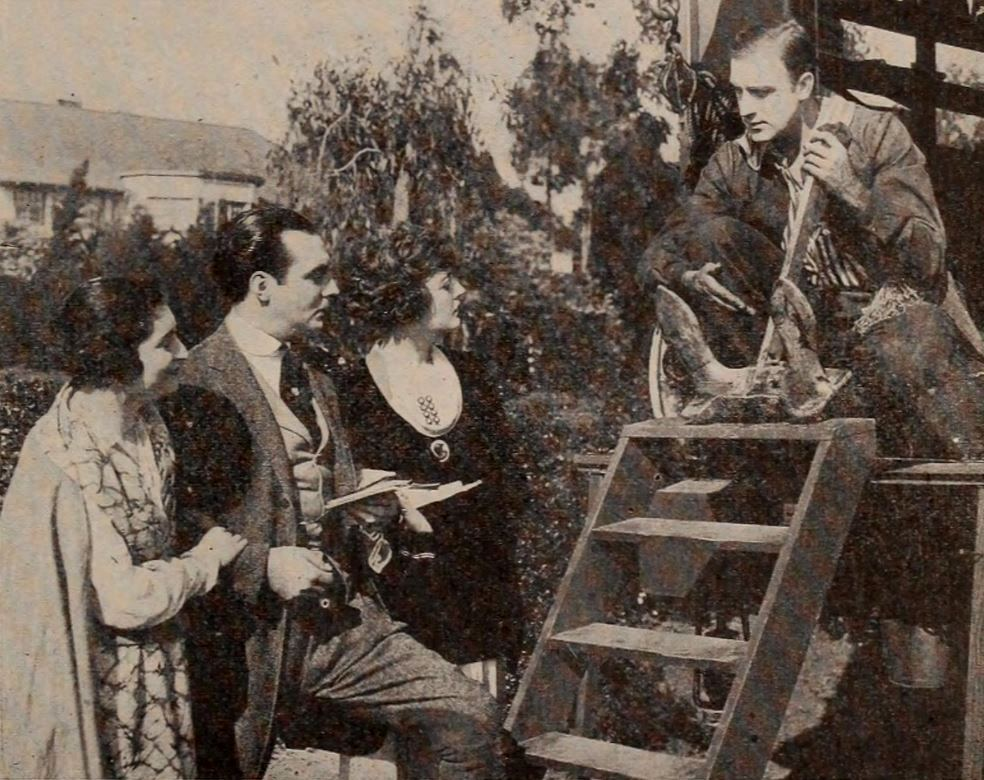
- Directed by: William C. Dowlan
- Screenplay by: Philip D. Hurn
- Based on: The Peddler by Henry C. Rowland
- Starring: Frank Mayo; Ora Carew; Ora Devereaux; Harold Miller; Dagmar Godowsky; Bonnie Hill
- Cinematography: Stephen S. Norton; Howard Oswald
- Production company: Universal Film Manufacturing Company
- Distributed by: Universal Film Manufacturing Company
- Release date: March 1, 1920
- Running time: 50 minutes
- Country: United States
- Language: English

The Peddler of Lies is a 1920 American mystery film directed by William C. Dowlan and written by Philip D. Hurn. It is based on the 1919 novel The Peddler by Henry C. Rowland. The film stars Frank Mayo, Ora Carew, Ora Devereaux, Harold Miller, Dagmar Godowsky and Bonnie Hill. The film was released on March 1, 1920, by Universal Film Manufacturing Company.

== Cast ==
- Frank Mayo as Clamp
- Ora Carew as Diana
- Ora Devereaux as Leontine de Vallignac
- Harold Miller as James Kirkland
- Dagmar Godowsky as Patricia Melton
- Bonnie Hill as Marquise d'Irancy
- Flora Hollister
- Truman Van Dyke
- Ray Ripley
- Esther Ralston

== Preservation ==
Currently it is a lost film.
