= That Girl Montana =

1921 film

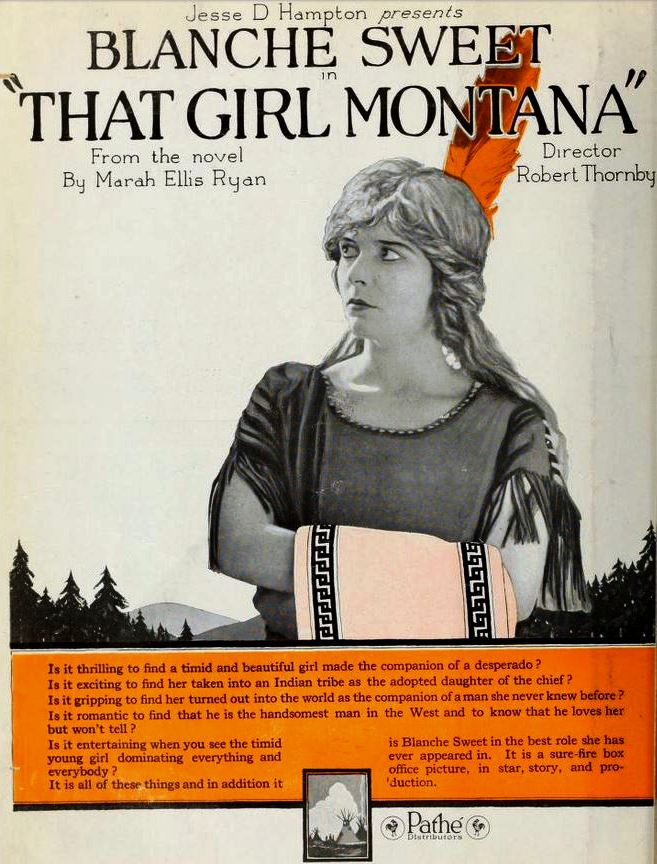
- Theatrical release poster
- Directed by: Robert Thornby
- Written by: George H. Plympton
- Based on: That Girl Montana by Marah Ellis Ryan
- Produced by: Jesse D. Hampton
- Starring: Blanche Sweet
- Cinematography: Lucien Andriot
- Distributed by: Pathé Exchange
- Release date: January 8, 1921
- Running time: 5 reels
- Country: United States
- Languages: Silent; English intertitles

That Girl Montana is an extant 1921 American silent Western film starring Blanche Sweet and distributed by Pathé Exchange. Jesse D. Hampton produced and Robert Thornby directed. The film is based on a 1901 novel, That Girl Montana, by Marah Ellis Ryan. This is one of Sweet's few 1920s silent films to survive and is available in the DVD format.

== Plot ==
As summarized in a film publication, Montana Rivers finally escapes her father who had forced her to wear men's clothing and help in robbing and cheating. She is taken in by friendly Indians and stays at their camp. Later, Akkomi, chief of the tribe, asks his friend Dan Overton to take the girl as it is not good for her to remain in the camp. Dan provides for "Tana" and falls in love with her but, because of her past, she keeps him at a distance. Jim Harris comes by and recognizes Tana as the boy robber, but when he attempts to blacken her past, Dan gives him a beating which paralyzes him. Jim then stays on with Dan, who regrets his hastiness. Eventually Tana's father appears and demands that Tana go away with him. She refuses but also does not tell Dan of this trouble. Meanwhile, Jim has waited to avenge himself against Tana's father, who previously had run off with Jim's wife and baby. When Tana's outlaw father appears, Jim, whose arms are still strong, strangles him. Jim tells Tana that she is his daughter, the child of the wife who had run away. The film ends with Tana and Dan embracing.

== Cast ==
- Blanche Sweet as Montana Rivers
- Mahlon Hamilton as Dan Overton
- Frank Lanning as Jim Harris
- Edward Peil Sr. as Lee Holly
- Charles Edler as Akkomi
- Claire Du Brey as Lottie
- Kate Price as Mrs Huzzard
- Jack Roseleigh as Max Lyster

== Censorship ==
Before That Girl Montana could be exhibited in Kansas, the Kansas Board of Review required the elimination of the scenes where a man is being tortured by a rope and the close-up of a man choking another. The board also wanted the stagecoach hold-up to be shortened.

== See also ==
- Blanche Sweet filmography
