= False Colors =

False Colors or Colours may refer to:

- False Colors (1943 film), an American Western film
- False Colors (1914 film), an American silent drama film
- False colors
- False Colours (novel), a novel by Georgette Heyer
- False Colours (1793 play), a comedy play by Edward Morris
- False Colours (1935 play), a play by Frank Harvey
