= The Blazing Trail =

The Blazing Trail may refer to:

- The Blazing Trail (1921 film), a 1921 American silent melodrama film, directed by Robert Thornby
- The Blazing Trail (1949 film), a 1949 American western film, directed by Ray Nazarro
