= Told in the Hills =

1919 film

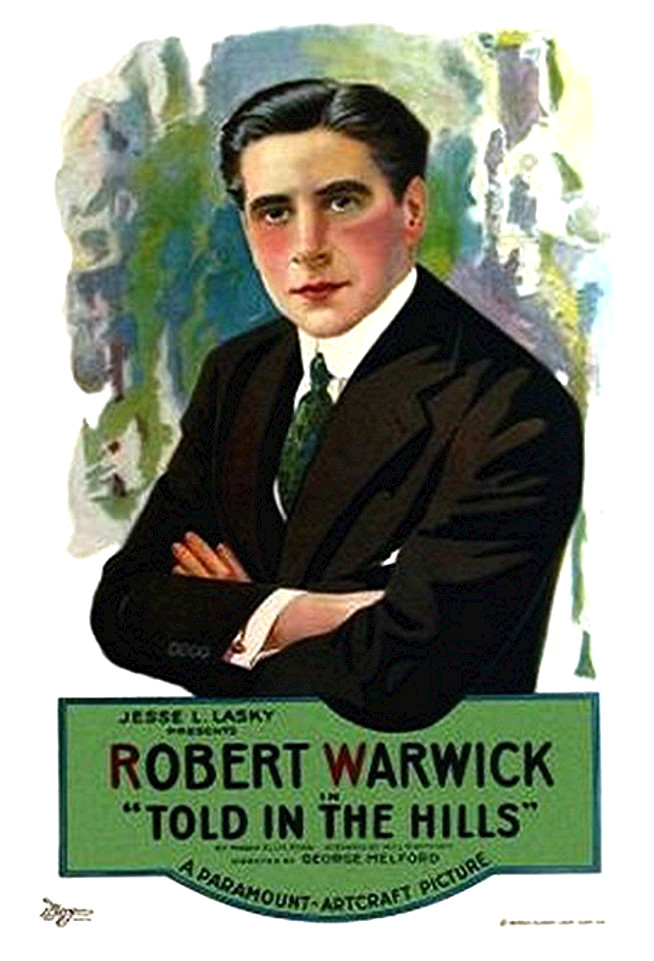
- Film poster
- Directed by: George Melford
- Written by: Will M. Ritchey
- Based on: Told in the Hills by Marah Ellis Ryan
- Produced by: Adolph Zukor; Jesse Lasky
- Starring: Robert Warwick
- Cinematography: Henry Kotani; Paul P. Perry; James Wong Howe (assistant camera)
- Distributed by: Paramount / Artcraft
- Release date: September 21, 1919
- Running time: 6 reels; 1,800 meters
- Country: United States
- Languages: Silent; English intertitles

Told in the Hills is a 1919 American silent Western film produced by Famous Players–Lasky and distributed by Paramount Artcraft. George Melford directed the film and Robert Warwick stars. It was based on the same-titled 1891 novel by Marah Ellis Ryan.

== Cast ==
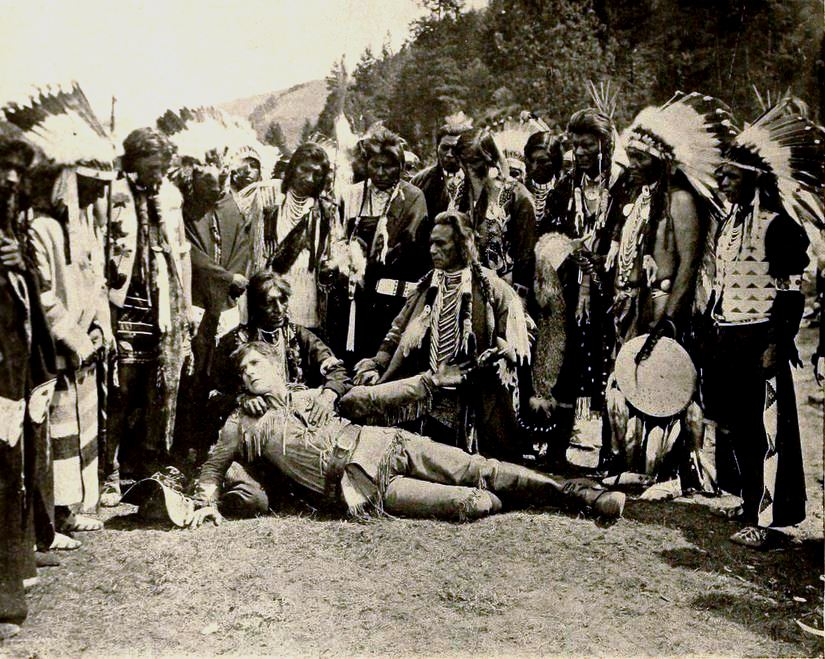
Film still

- Robert Warwick as Jack Stuart
- Ann Little as Rachel Hardy
- Tom Forman as Charles Stuart
- Wanda Hawley as Ann Belleau
- Charles Ogle as Davy MacDougall
- Monte Blue as Kalitan
- Margaret Loomis as Talapa
- Eileen Percy as Tillie Hardy
- Jack Hoxie as Henry Hardy (credited as Hart Hoxie)
- Jack Herbert as Skulking Brave
- Guy Oliver as Captain Hold

== Production ==
Told in the Hills was filmed on location in Lewiston and Lapwai, Idaho, and employed hundreds from the Nez Perce tribe. It was claimed that during the production of the film was the first time so many men of the Nez Perce had been allowed to gather since the Nez Perce War of 1877.

== Preservation ==
In 1986, Boise State University professor Tom Trusky inquired at the Gosfilmofond about the existence of Told in the Hills, in addition to several Nell Shipman films, for an exhibit on Idaho in film. The director of the Gosfilmofond replied that they had reels 3 and 4 preserved as 35 mm duplicate negatives, and that the films have been at the archive since 1951. A copy of the film, with Russian intertitles, was sent to BSU archives. Trusky went on to make a short documentary Retold in the Hills describing his successful interactions with Gosfilmofond.

In 2023, Colin Mannex, the executive director of the Kenworthy Performing Arts Center in Moscow, Idaho, learned of the film's existence. In January 2024, he applied for and received a $7500 grant from the Idaho Humanities Council to restore the film, but in April, the National Endowment for the Humanities was, because of DOGE, unable to support the Council and 70% of the Council's funding was eliminated. The restoration continued, but with difficulty and it was scaled-down.

The 4K restoration premiered at the Kenworthy Silent Film Festival on September 26 with a new score by Connor Chee.
