= The Shock (film) =

1923 film

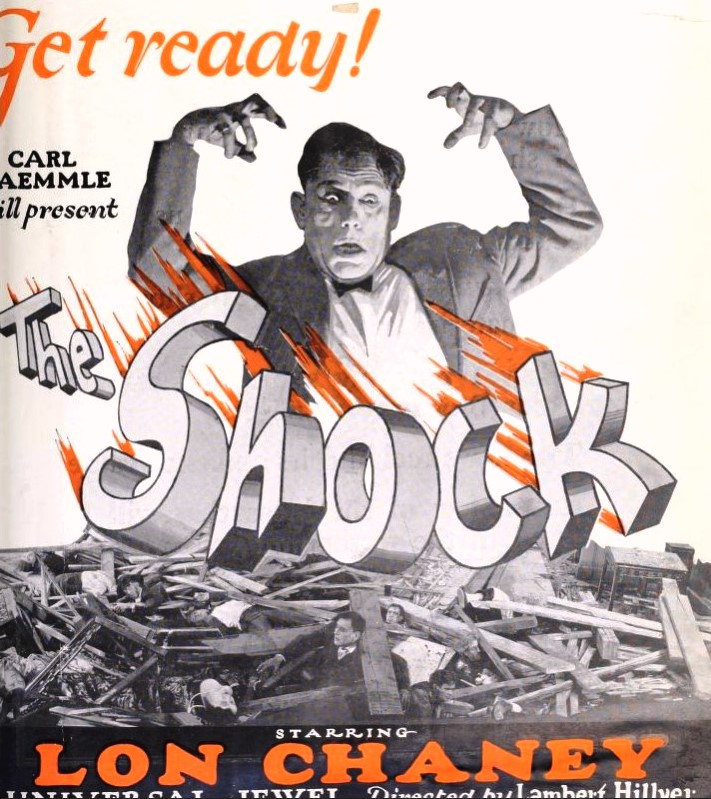
- Trade advertisement
- Directed by: Lambert Hillyer
- Written by: Arthur Statter (scenario); Charles Kenyon (scenario)
- Based on: The Pit of the Golden Dragon (magazine story) by William Dudley Pelley
- Produced by: Carl Laemmle
- Starring: Lon Chaney; Virginia Valli; Christine Mayo; Jack Mower
- Cinematography: Dwight Warren
- Production company: Universal Pictures
- Distributed by: Universal Pictures
- Release date: June 10, 1923
- Running time: 64 minutes (7 reels, 6,738 ft.)
- Country: United States
- Language: Silent (English intertitles)

The Shock (1923)

The Shock is a 1923 American silent drama film directed by Lambert Hillyer and starring Lon Chaney as a disabled man named Wilse Dilling. The film was written by Arthur Statter and Charles Kenyon, based on a magazine story by William Dudley Pelley. This is one of the rare Lon Chaney films in which his character ends up with the female "love interest." The film is readily available on DVD.

Costing only $90,000 to make, the film took in a huge profit for Universal. A lobby card from the film can be seen on the internet, as well as the film's poster art. The film's tagline was "You haven't seen anything yet!"

== Plot ==
In 1906, Wilse Dilling, a crippled gangster living in Chinatown, receives a coded message to go to the home of his boss, Ann Cardington, known as "Queen Ann", a powerful crime boss feared in the underworld. When Wilse meets with her, she sends him to the suburban town of Fallbrook, where he is to establish himself and await her instructions in dealing with a former lover of hers, a banker named Micha Hadley, who had once betrayed her. Dilling is to pose as a telegraph operator in the local office there in order to keep watch on the banker.

Being dependent on crutches and a wheelchair has not stopped Dilling from committing a lengthy series of crimes, but to his surprise, he finds that the small town atmosphere makes him feel alive for the first time. He befriends banker Hadley's attractive daughter Gertrude. Dilling falls in love with her and she helps him believe that even he can make a fresh start. Gertrude, however, is engaged to young Jack Cooper, and Chaney realizes that a pretty girl like her would never be attracted to a handicapped man like himself.

Dilling's new-found contentment is soon shattered by a series of new developments which includes trying to stop Queen Ann's plot against both Hadley and Gertrude. Years ago, Queen Ann had forced Hadley to embezzle funds from his own bank by blackmailing him. Now threatened with exposure as an embezzler, Hadley lashes out at Dilling when he confesses that he is part of Queen Ann's scheme. When Dilling attempts to blow up the bank to cover up the evidence against Hadley, it goes badly and Gertrude and her fiancé Cooper are caught in the blast. With Gertrude severely injured, Cooper's father forces him to break off their engagement.

With the bank records destroyed, bank examiners are now unable to find evidence against Hadley. After surgery, his daughter is expected to make a complete recovery but Queen Anne still seeks revenge. Dilling tries to recover a document that his boss is using to blackmail Hadley, but with her henchmen, Ann kidnaps Gertrude to Dilling's despair. When asked, Cooper refuses to help Dilling to rescue Gertrude, revealing his cowardice.

Dilling confronts the criminals alone in their cafe hideout and pleads with Queen Ann to release Gertrude. Before anything can happen, the entire city is caught up in the San Francisco earthquake. Queen Ann and her gang are killed in the disaster. Dilling survives and finds that the shock of the earthquake has restored his ability to walk again. After he recuperates, he begins a new life with Gertrude.

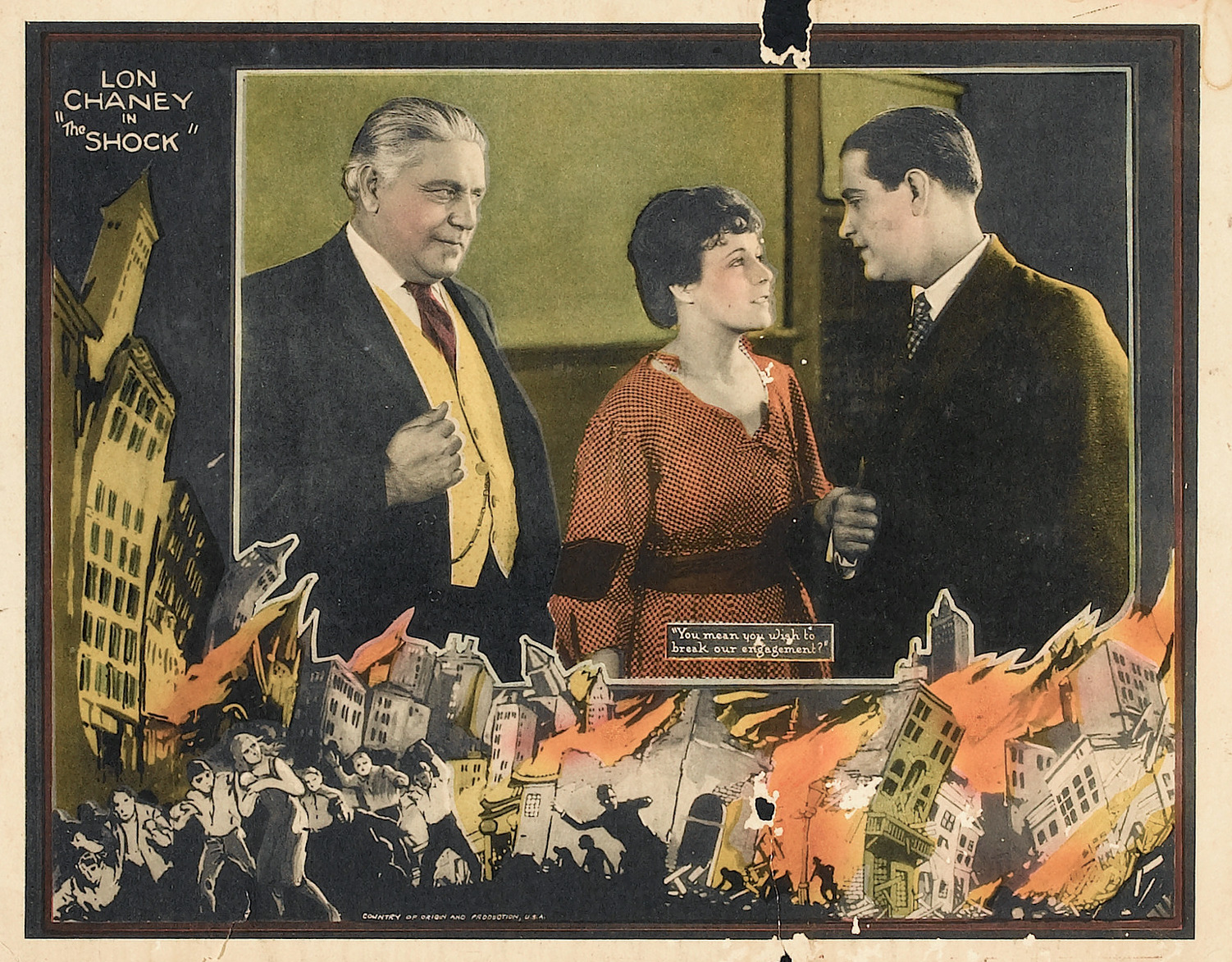
Lobby card

== Cast ==
- Lon Chaney as Wilse Dilling
- Virginia Valli as Gertrude Hadley
- Jack Mower as Jack Cooper
- William Welsh as Micha Hadley
- Henry A. Barrows as John Cooper Sr.
- Christine Mayo as Ann Cardington, AKA "Queen Anne"
- Harry De Vere as Olaf Wismer
- John Beck as Bill
- Walter Long as The Captain
- Pat Harmon as Horse Cabdriver (uncredited)
- Bob Kortman as Henchman (uncredited)
- George Marion as Townsman (uncredited)
- Steve Murphy as Man Eating at Mandarin Cafe (uncredited)
- Togo Yamamoto as Messenger at Restaurant (uncredited)

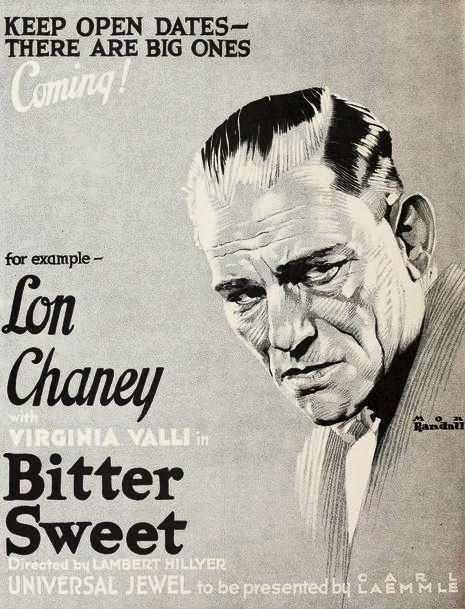
Ad using the film's working title

== Production ==
The working title of the film was Bittersweet. The screenplay was based on William Dudley Pelley's magazine story, "The Pit of the Golden Dragon". Although mainly shot in the Universal studios, the climactic earthquake scenes were a mix of model work and archival film footage, mixed in with the live action. Principal photography on The Shock took place in June 1922, after Chaney finished work as Fagin on Oliver Twist (1922) in late May 1922.

== Critical comments ==
"In affording Lon Chaney one of the spectacular characterizations for which he has shown an aptitude, Universal has achieved a striking success in THE SHOCK...For his followers the production will most likely have an intense appeal... At times his extreme physical deformity and resulting contortion are rather harrowing. He gives a vivid performance, but sometimes it is too intense to be pleasant." ---Moving Picture World

"The picture is an underworld story, with Chaney cast as a cripple, and the effort apparently was to give it some touch of the atmosphere of THE MIRACLE MAN, in which Chaney came into fame almost overnight in the part of the "Frog." The subject misses by a wide margin the high aim of the other vehicle and degenerates into a cheap shocker." --- Variety

"Lon Chaney gives another of his hideously distorted, and uncannily clever, characterizations." ---Photoplay

"An uncommonly realistic, well directed story of the underworld....a melodrama of compelling interest. Lon Chaney's work in the role of the crippled crook stands out as a really astonishing performance". ---Exhibitors Trade Review

"(Chaney's) ability to handle the role of a cripple is little short of uncanny. His portrayal of Wilse Dilling is interesting and for the most part convincing." ---Film Daily

== Preservation status ==
A print of the film is maintained in the Film Preservation Associates, Incorporated archive. The film is readily available on DVD.
