= Don't Marry for Money =

1923 film

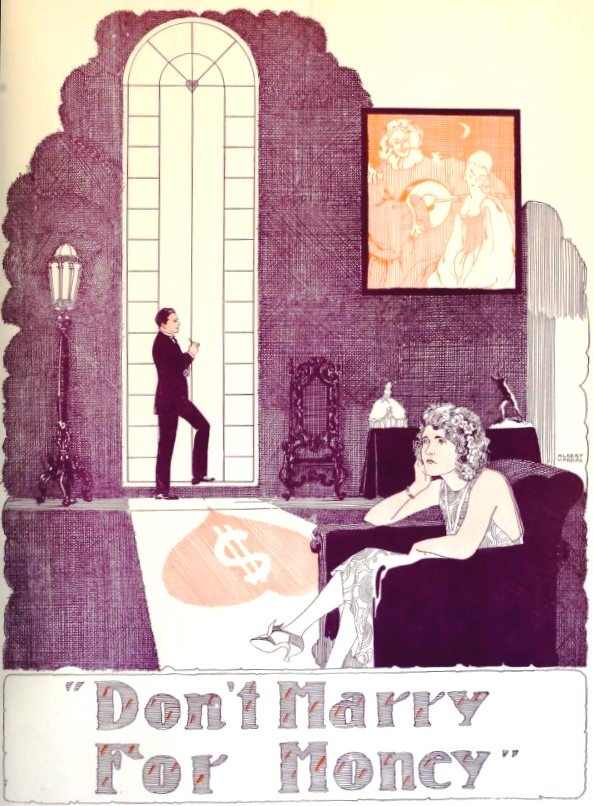
- Advertisement
- Directed by: Clarence Brown
- Written by: Louis D. Lighton; Hope Loring
- Produced by: B.P. Fineman
- Starring: House Peters; Rubye De Remer; Aileen Pringle
- Production companies: Weber & North Productions
- Distributed by: Preferred Pictures
- Release date: August 19, 1923
- Running time: 60 minutes
- Country: United States
- Language: Silent (English intertitles)

Don't Marry for Money is a 1923 American silent drama film directed by Clarence Brown and starring House Peters, Rubye De Remer, and Aileen Pringle.

== Synopsis ==
A woman marries a millionaire, but finds her new life does not satisfy her romantic ambitions. She begins a flirtation with another man, not realising that he specialises in compromising wealthy woman and then blackmailing them. Her husband eventually rescues her in time.

== Cast ==
- House Peters as Peter Smith
- Rubye De Remer as Marion Whitney
- Aileen Pringle as Edith Martin
- Cyril Chadwick as Crane Martin
- Christine Mayo as Rose Graham
- Wedgwood Nowell as The Inspector
- George Nichols as Amos Webb
- Hank Mann as An explorer
- Charles Wellesley as Alec Connor

== Bibliography ==
- McCaffrey, Donald W. & Jacobs, Christopher P. Guide to the Silent Years of American Cinema. Greenwood Publishing, 1999. ISBN 0-313-30345-2
- Munden, Kenneth White. The American Film Institute Catalog of Motion Pictures Produced in the United States, Part 1. University of California Press, 1997.
