= Robert Thornby =

American film director

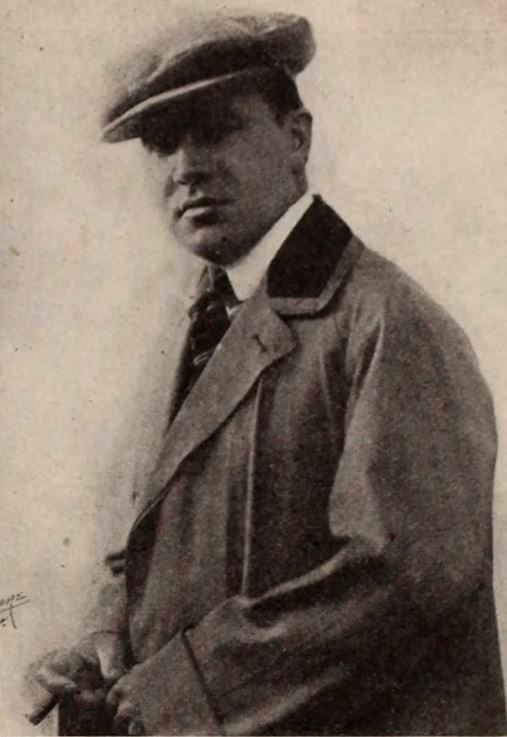
- From a 1920 magazine
- Born: March 27, 1888; New York, New York, US
- Died: March 6, 1953 (aged 64); Los Angeles, California, US
- Occupation: Film director
- Years active: 1911–1930

Robert Thornby (March 27, 1888 – March 6, 1953) was an American director and actor of the silent era. He directed 75 films between 1913 and 1927. He also appeared in 48 films between 1911 and 1930. He was born in New York, New York, and died in Los Angeles, California.

His ability to work with and direct both children and animals led him, while with Keystone Comedies studio, also known as the "Keystone Kiddies", to direct four of the Little Billy films starring child actor Paul Jacobs in 1914. He left Keystone to become a member of the Sterling Film Company which specialized in comedies and served as director. He worked with president Fred J. Balshofer and secretary-treasurer Henry Lehrman, before the company dissolved in 1915. He also worked for Peerless Studio and later went on to direct films under Paramount in the late 1910s and early 1920s.

As Director of The Fox in 1921, he was recognized for his skill filming complicated horseback riding and fighting scenes. He worked as an assistant to Maurice Tourneur on the film Lorna Doone in 1922.

== Filmography ==
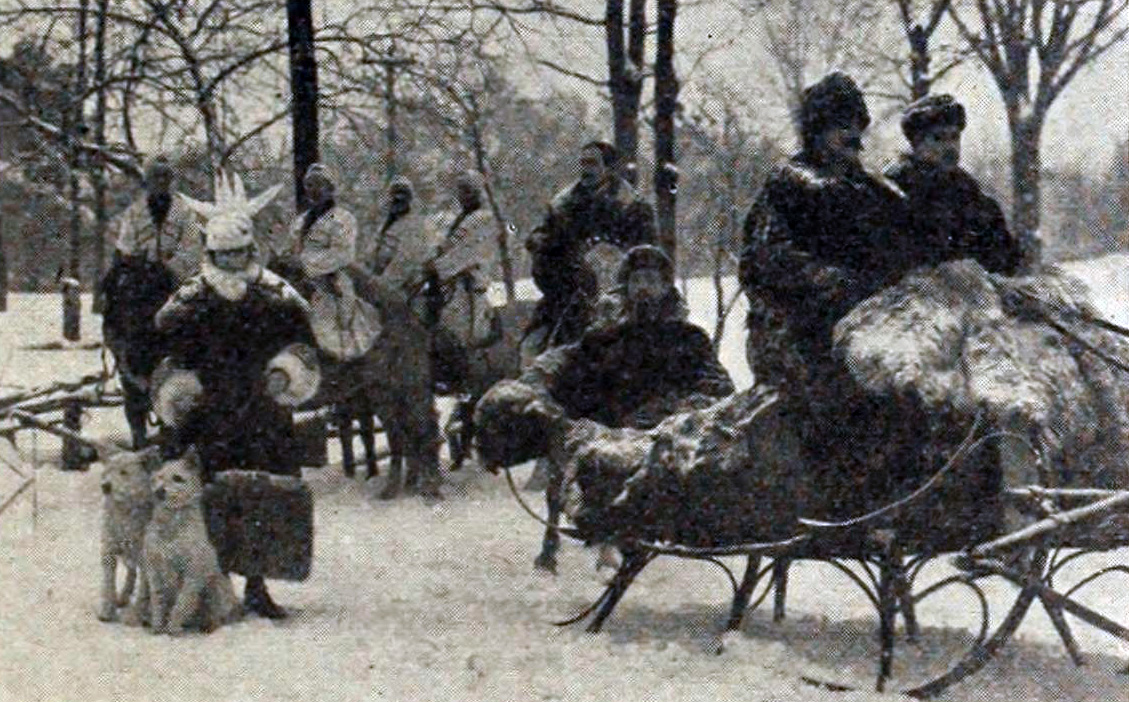
The Crucial Test (1916)

=== Directed Features ===
- A Wasted Sacrifice (1912) *
- Bianca (1913)
- A Broken Melody (1913)
- Hicksville Fortune Hunters (1913) (sometimes referred to as The Fortune Hunters of Hicksville)
- Her Faith in the Flag (1913)
- Little Kaintuck (1913)
- Our Children (1913)
- The Outlaw (1913)
- A Pair of Prodigals (1913) *
- The Passing of Joe Mary (1913) *
- Salvation Sal (1913)
- The Race (1913) *
- Sandy and Shorty Work Together (1913) *
- Sandy and Shorty at the Circus (1913)
- Sandy Gets Shorty a Job (1913) *
- Sandy and Shorty Start Something (1914)
- Sleuths Unawares (1913)
- Tangled Threads (1913) *
- When Friendship Ceases (1913) *
- When Ghost Meets Ghost (1913)
- His Lordship, Billy Smoke (1913)
- Back to Eden 1913)
- Daddy's Soldier Boy (1913)
- Little Billy films (1914)
  - Little Billy's Triumph
  - Little Billy's Strategy
  - Little Billy's City Cousin
  - The Race
- A Backyard theatre (1914) One source states that this film was not directed by Thornby.
- The Battle (1914)
- Kids (1914)
- Kid Love (1914)
- The Old Soak's Secret (1914)
- Quantrell's Son (1914) *
- The Return of Jack Bellew (1914) *
- Sonny and Shorty Start Something (1914) *
- A False Move (1914)
- Tommy's Tramp (1914)
- Broken Chains (1916) (formerly titled The New South)
- The Crucial Test (1916) (formerly titled The Eternal Sacrifice)
- The Woman's Power (1916)
- The Almighty Dollar (1916)
- On Dangerous Ground (1916)
- Her Maternal Right (1916)
- The Fair Barbarian (1917)
- Forbidden Paths (1917)
- The Hostage (1917)
- A Kiss for Susie (1917)
- Little Miss Optimist (1917)
- Molly Entangled (1917)
- A Little Sister of Everybody (1918)
- Lawless Love (1918)
- Her Inspiration (1918)
- The Fallen Angel (1918)
- Carolyn of the Corners (1919)
- Rose O' The River (1919)
- When My Ship Comes In (1919)
- The Prince and Betty (1920)
- Fighting Cressy (1920)
- Are You Legally Married? (1919)
- The Deadlier Sex (1920)
- Simple Souls (1920)
- The Girl in the Web (1920)
- Felix O'Day (1920)
- Half A Chance (1920)
- Blood Brothers of the Pines (1921)
- The Magnificent Brute (1921)
- That Girl Montana (1921)
- The Fox (1921)
- The Blazing Trail (1921)
- The Trap (1922); formerly titled The Heart of a Wolf and The Mask
- The Sagebrush Trail (1922)
- Stormswept (1923)
- The Drivin' Fool (1923)
- West of Broadway (1926)
- Run Tin Can (1926)
- Whoa, Emma! (1926)
- The Speeding Venus (1926)
- Young Hollywood (1927)

=== Acting Credits ===
- Beyond the Law (1911)
- The Black Chasm (1911)
- The Half-Breed's Daughter (1911)
- The Indian Flute (1911)
- The Voiceless Message (1911)
- Una of the Sierras (1912)
- The Better Man (1912)
- The Craven (1912)
- A Girl of the Golden West (1912)
- The Greater Love (1912)
- Natoosa (1912)
- The Price of Big Bob's Silence (1912)
- Sunset, or, Her Only Romance (1912)
- A Wasted Sacrifice (1912) *
- When California Was Young (1912)
- Tangled Threads (1913) *
- What God Hath Joined Together (1913)
- When Friendship Ceases (1913) *
- After the Honeymoon (1913)
- The Angel of the Desert (1913)
- A Corner in Crooks (1913)
- A Pair of Prodigals (1913) *
- The Passing of Joe Mary (1913) *
- The Power That Rules (1913)
- The Race (1913) *
- Sandy and Shorty Work Together (1913) *
- Sandy Gets Shorty a Job (1913) *
- When the Desert Was Kind (1913)
- The Whispered Word (1913)
- The Winning Hand (1913)
- The Wrong Pair (1913)
- Quantrells's Son (1914) *
- The Return of Jack Bellew (1914) *
- Sonny and Shorty Start Something (1914) *
- The Great Universal Mystery (1914)
- Today (1930)

=== Author and script writing credits ===
- Old California (1914)
- Quantrell's Son (1914) *
- The Return of Jack Bellew (1914) *

=== Photography (director of photography) ===
- The Kick Back (1922)
