= Blaming the Duck, or Ducking the Blame =

1915 silent short film

- Directed by: Earl Metcalfe
- Produced by: Siegmund Lubin
- Starring: Billie Reeves
- Distributed by: General Film Company
- Release date: November 27, 1915
- Running time: 1 reel
- Country: USA
- Language: Silent

Blaming the Duck, or Ducking the Blame is a 1915 silent short film directed by Earl Metcalfe. The film is currently considered lost.

== Cast ==
- Billie Reeves - Jack, the Husband
- Carrie Reynolds - Lucille, the Wife
- Arthur Matthews - Lucille's Father
- Jessie Terry - Milly, the Cook
- Charles Griffiths - Barton, Jack's Pal
- Patty De Forest - Miss Simpson
- Mary Carr - Mrs. Jones (*as Mrs. Carr)
