= The Drifters (film) =

1919 silent film

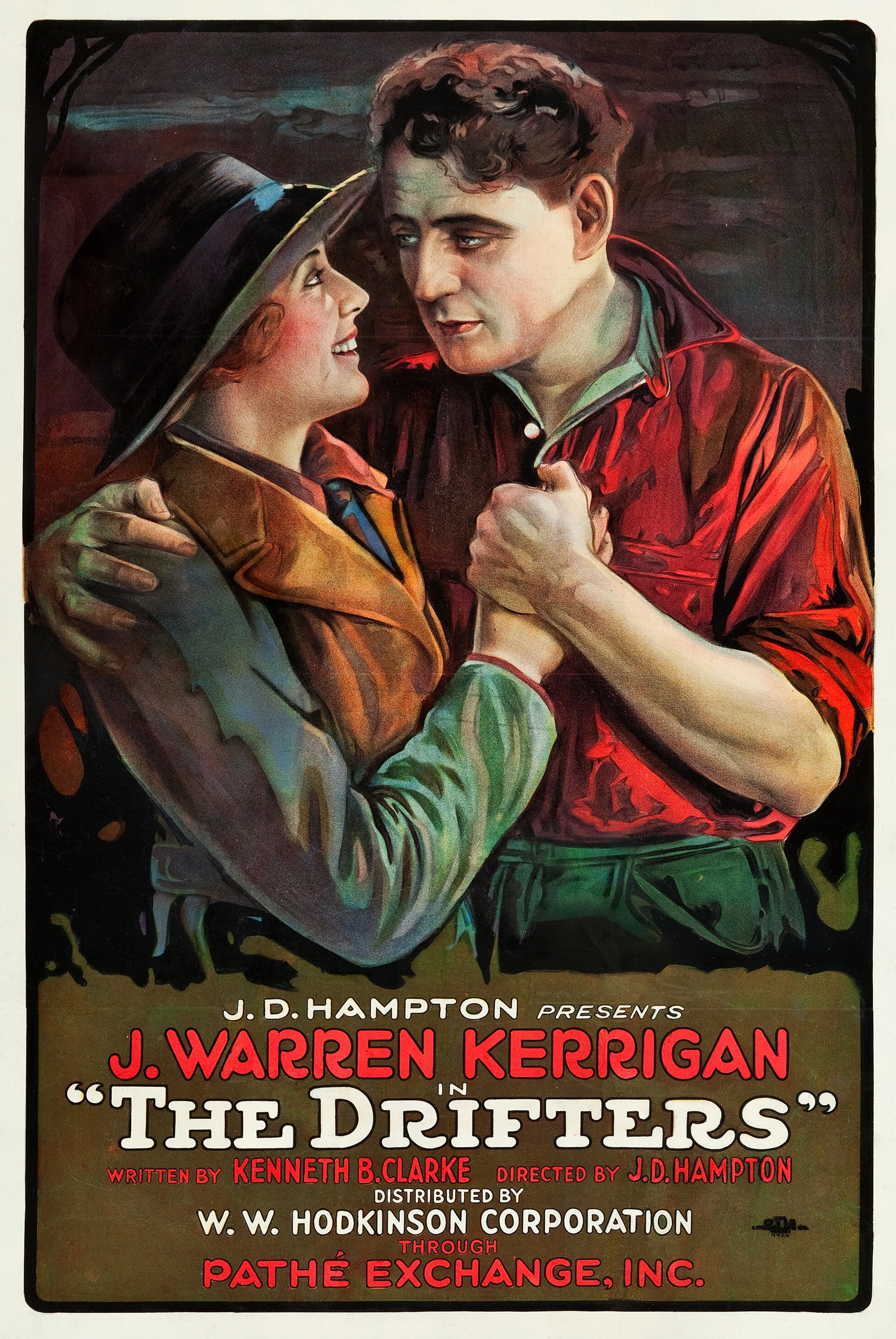
- Directed by: Jesse D. Hampton
- Written by: Kenneth B. Clarke
- Produced by: Jesse D. Hampton
- Starring: J. Warren Kerrigan; William Conklin; Lois Wilson
- Cinematography: Charles J. Stumar
- Production company: Jesse D. Hampton Productions
- Distributed by: Pathé Exchange; W. W. Hodkinson Corporation
- Release date: January 6, 1919
- Running time: 50 minutes
- Country: United States
- Languages: Silent; English intertitles

The Drifters is a 1919 American silent drama film directed by Jesse D. Hampton and starring J. Warren Kerrigan, William Conklin and Lois Wilson.

== Cast ==
- J. Warren Kerrigan as Burke Marston
- William Conklin as Evan Mears
- Casson Ferguson as Hugh MacLaren
- Lois Wilson as The Girl
- Walter Perry as Pat Gerry

== Bibliography ==
- Darby, William. Masters of Lens and Light: A Checklist of Major Cinematographers and Their Feature Films. Scarecrow Press, 1991.
