= Jesse D. Hampton =

American film director

- Born: November 28, 1879; Galesburg, Illinois, United States
- Died: June 1, 1968 (aged 88); Monterey, California, United States
- Occupations: Producer, director
- Years active: 1918-1923 (film)

Jesse D. Hampton (1879–1968) was an American film producer of the silent era. He also directed three films. Hampton was originally a tobacco executive before turning to filmmaking. From 1918 he rented space at the KCET Studios for his independent productions. The following year he constructed his own studios, later taken over by Douglas Fairbanks and Mary Pickford before eventually becoming the Samuel Goldwyn Studio.

Many of his productions were distributed by Pathé Exchange and Film Booking Offices of America. His period as a filmmaker was brief, with his last known involvement being the 1923 film The Spoilers.

== Selected filmography ==
- Three X Gordon (1918)
- Prisoners of the Pines (1918)
- What Every Woman Wants (1919)
- The Drifters (1919)
- A Fugitive from Matrimony (1919)
- A Woman of Pleasure (1919)
- The Pagan God (1919)
- Fighting Cressy (1919)
- The Prodigal Liar (1919)
- The Prince and Betty (1919)
- The Gray Wolf's Ghost (1919)
- A Sagebrush Hamlet (1919)
- The End of the Game (1919)
- Haunting Shadows (1919)
- Bare-Fisted Gallagher (1919)
- Help Wanted - Male (1920)
- Dice of Destiny (1920)
- Her Unwilling Husband (1920)
- A Broadway Cowboy (1920)
- Uncharted Channels (1920)
- The White Dove (1920)
- Their Mutual Child (1920)
- The Girl in the Web (1920)
- Simple Souls (1920)
- Felix O'Day (1920)
- One Hour Before Dawn (1920)
- The Deadlier Sex (1920)
- When We Were 21 (1921)
- The Cave Girl (1921)
- That Girl Montana (1921)
- The Spoilers (1923)

== Bibliography ==
- Gierach, Ryan. West Hollywood. Arcadia Publishing, 2003.
- Golden, Eve. John Gilbert: The Last of the Silent Film Stars. University Press of Kentucky, 2013.
- Wanamaker, Marc. Hollywood 1940-2008. Arcadia Publishing, 2009.
