= The Sagebrush Trail (1922 film) =

1922 film

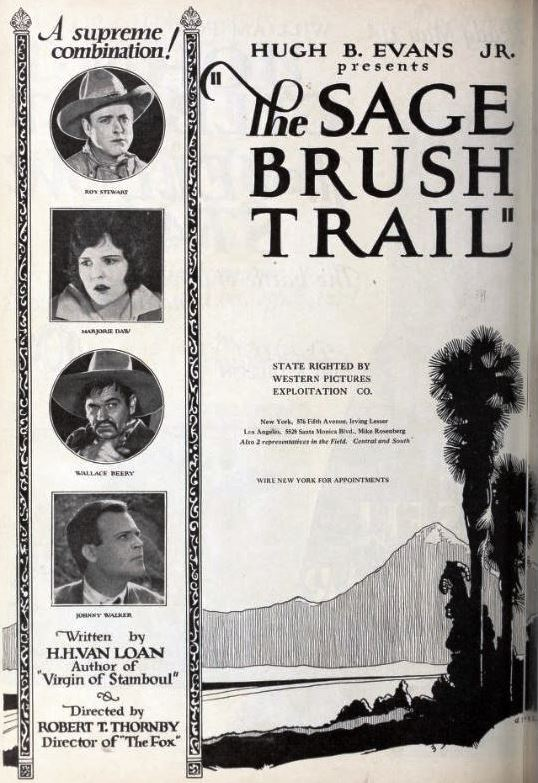
- Directed by: Robert Thornby
- Written by: H. H. Van Loan
- Produced by: Hugh B. Evans Jr.
- Starring: Roy Stewart; Marjorie Daw; Wallace Beery
- Production company: Hugh B. Evans Jr. Productions
- Distributed by: Western Pictures Exploitation Company
- Release date: May 1922
- Running time: 50 minutes
- Country: United States
- Languages: Silent; English intertitles

The Sagebrush Trail is a 1922 American silent Western film directed by Robert Thornby and starring Roy Stewart, Marjorie Daw and Wallace Beery.

== Cast ==
- Roy Stewart as Sheriff Larry Reid
- Marjorie Daw as Mary Gray
- Johnnie Walker as Neil, Mary's brother
- Wallace Beery as José Fagaro

== Bibliography ==
- Connelly, Robert B. The Silents: Silent Feature Films, 1910-36, Volume 40, Issue 2. December Press, 1998.
- Munden, Kenneth White. The American Film Institute Catalog of Motion Pictures Produced in the United States, Part 1. University of California Press, 1997.
