= A Fugitive from Matrimony =

1919 film by Henry King

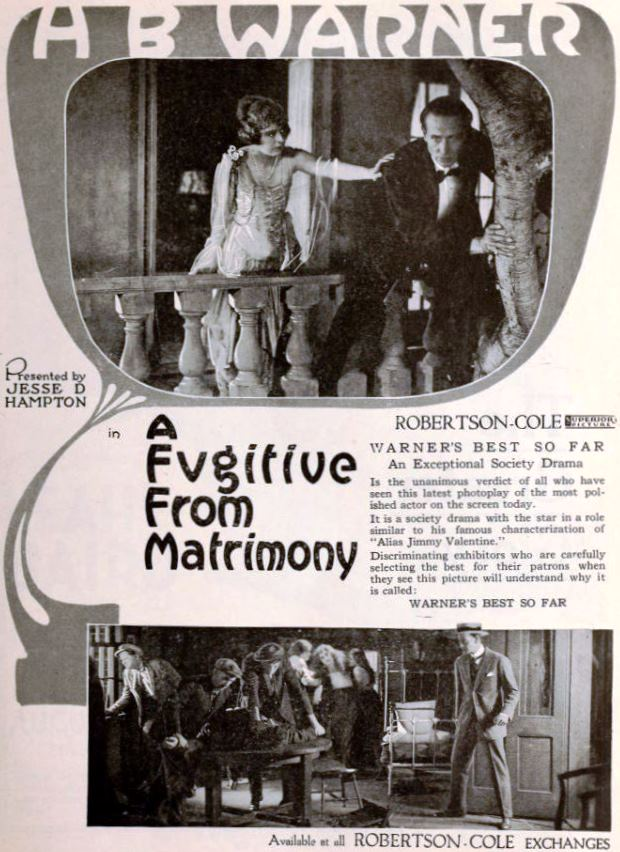
- Advertisement
- Directed by: Henry King
- Produced by: Jesse D. Hampton
- Starring: H.B. Warner; Seena Owen; Adele Farrington
- Production company: Jesse D. Hampton Productions
- Distributed by: Robertson-Cole Distributing Corporation
- Release date: November 23, 1919
- Running time: 50 minutes
- Country: United States
- Language: Silent (English intertitles)

A Fugitive from Matrimony is a 1919 American silent comedy film directed by Henry King and starring H.B. Warner, Seena Owen, and Adele Farrington.

== Cast ==
- H.B. Warner as Stephen Van Courtlandt
- Seena Owen as Barbara Riggs
- Adele Farrington as Mrs. E. Elmer Riggs
- Walter Perry as Zachariah E. Riggs
- Christine Mayo as Edythe Arlington
- Matthew Biddulph
- John Gough
- Lule Warrenton

== Bibliography ==
- Donald W. McCaffrey & Christopher P. Jacobs. Guide to the Silent Years of American Cinema. Greenwood Publishing, 1999. ISBN 0-313-30345-2
