= The End of the Game (1919 film) =

1919 film

- Directed by: Jesse D. Hampton
- Written by: F. McGrew Willis; George Elwood Jenks
- Produced by: Jesse D. Hampton
- Starring: J. Warren Kerrigan; Lois Wilson
- Cinematography: Charles J. Stumar
- Distributed by: W. W. Hodkinson Corporation; Pathé Exchange
- Release date: March 24, 1919
- Running time: 50 minutes
- Country: United States
- Language: Silent..English intertitles

The End of the Game is a 1919 American silent drama film produced and directed by Jesse D. Hampton and starring J. Warren Kerrigan. It was distributed by W. W. Hodkinson Corporation and Pathé Exchange.

== Cast ==
- J. Warren Kerrigan - Burke Allister
- Lois Wilson - Mary Miller
- Gayne Whitman - Frank Miller(*as Alfred Whitman)
- Jack Richardson - Dan Middleton
- George Field - Four-Ace Baker
- Milton Ross - Faro Ed
- Walter Perry - Wild Bill
- Elinor Fair - Mona
- Bert Appling - Sheriff
- Joseph J. Franz - Hotel Clerk (*as J.J. Franz)

== Preservation status ==
- The film is preserved in the EYE Institut Filmmuseum, Amsterdam, Netherlands.
