= Who's Your Neighbor? =

1917 film

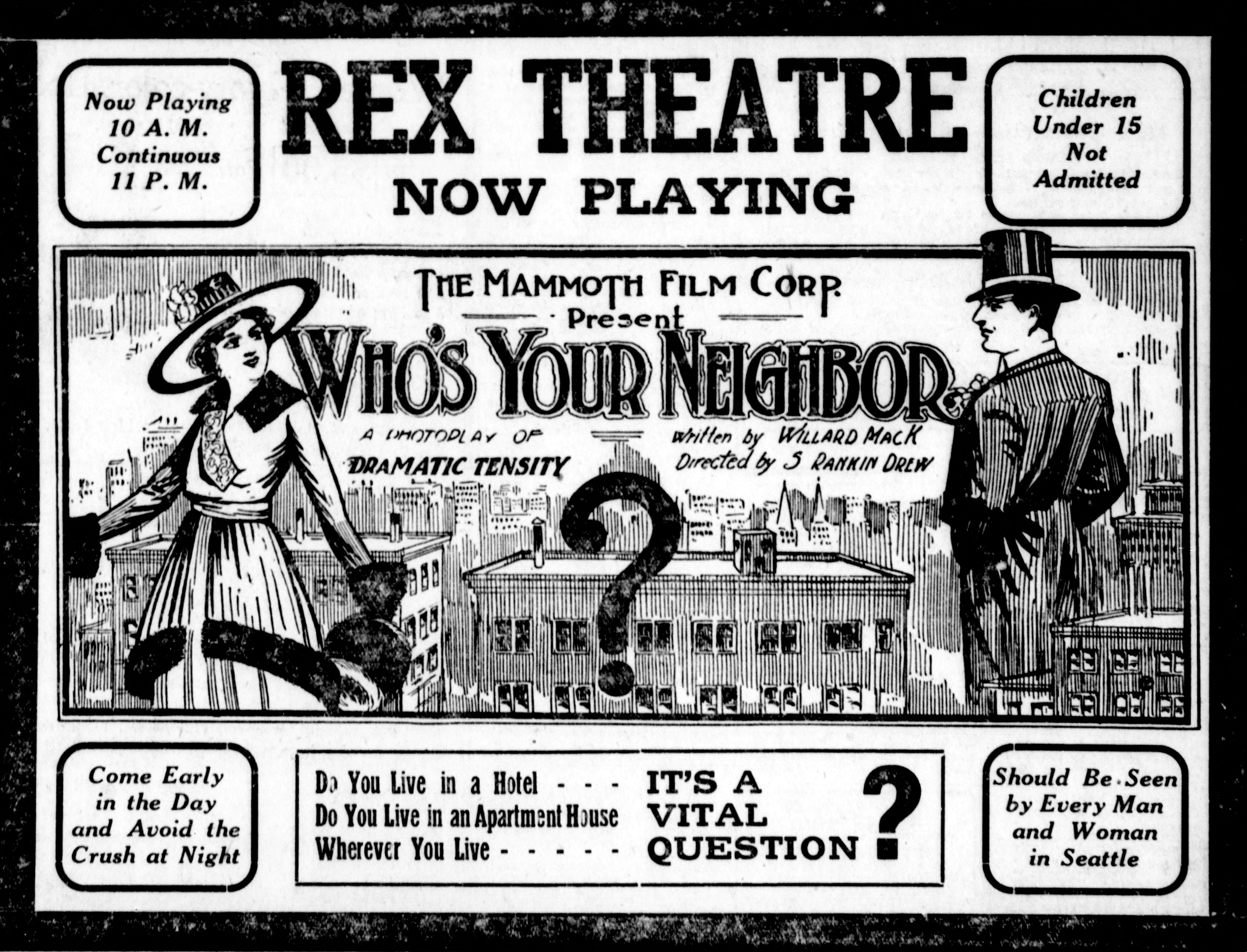
- Film's promotion in 1917 newspaper
- Directed by: S. Rankin Drew
- Written by: S. Rankin Drew; Willard Mack
- Produced by: Edward Small
- Starring: Christine Mayo
- Edited by: Frank Lawrence
- Production company: Master Drama Features
- Release date: June 15, 1917
- Running time: Seven reels originally
- Country: United States
- Language: Silent (English intertitles)

Who's Your Neighbor? is a 1917 silent American propaganda and drama film directed by S. Rankin Drew. The film's plot focuses around reformers who pass a law to force prostitutes, including Hattie Fenshaw, out of the red light district. Fenshaw becomes Bryant Harding's mistress and lives in an apartment next door to a reformer, and continues to ply her trade. After Fenshaw becomes familiar with Harding, his son, daughter and the daughter's fiancé, the climax of the film occurs as the cast assembles at Fenshaw's apartment. Harding returns and a fight breaks out that results in the reformers' arrival and concludes with the presumption that Fenshaw returns to a place of "legalized vice". The drama was written by Willard Mack and was his first foray into screen dramas. The film proved controversial, but is noted as a great success. The film originally debuted on June 15, 1917, but it was rejected by the National Board of Review and was later approved after a revision, but the film continued to be labeled as an immoral production. The film is presumed to be lost.

== Plot ==
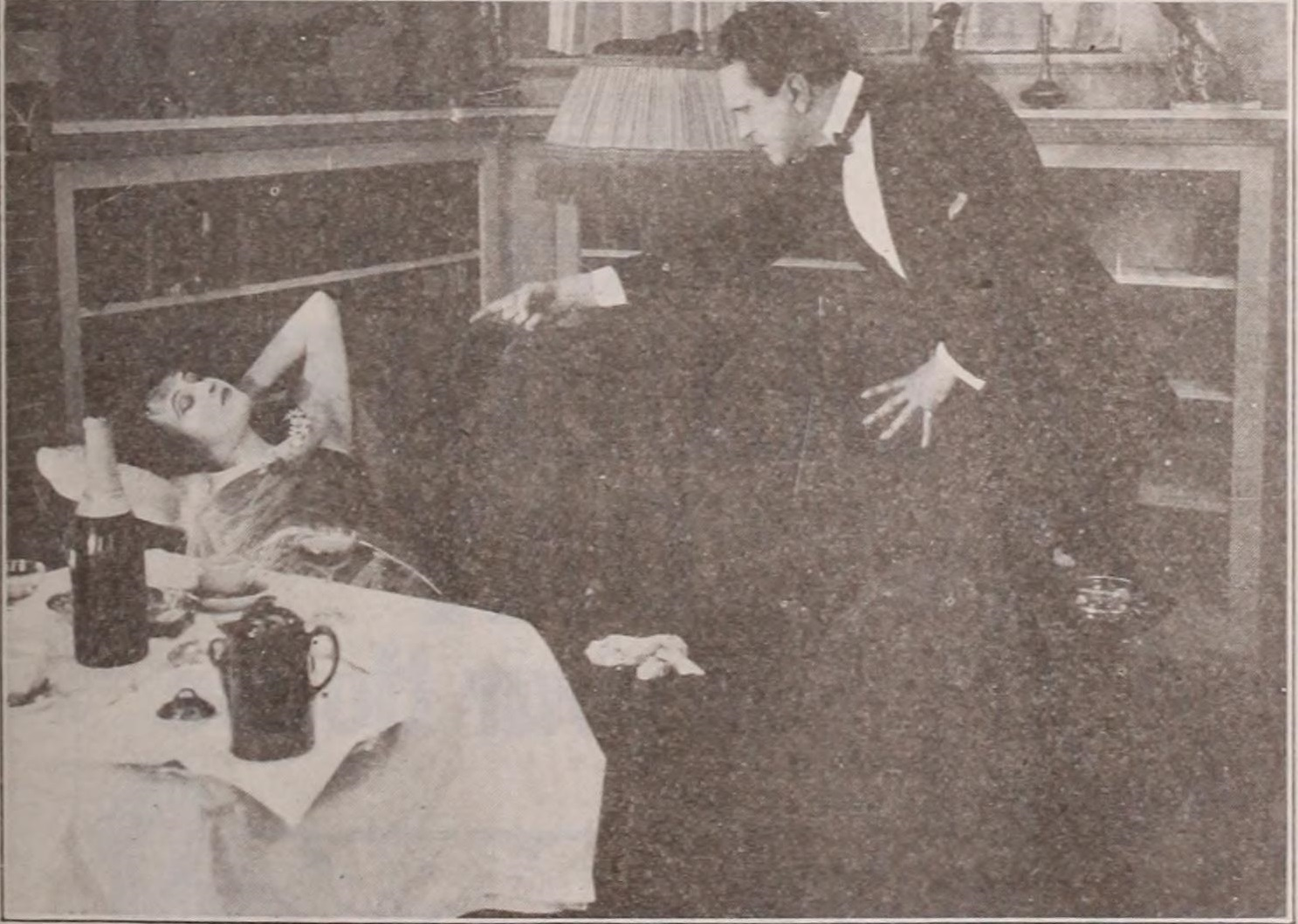
Film still from Who's Your Neighbor? in 1917 issue of Exhibitors Herald

A group of reformers, led by Mrs. Bowers, moves to have the red-light district closed and force the girls out. District Attorney Osborne, believes that it will turn out poorly for the town and tries to persuade the reforms that it would be like scattering smallpox. He fails to persuade them and the law is passed. The film focuses on one of the prostitutes, Hattie Fenshaw, who is forced out from her place of vice. According to H. D. Fretz's review, Fenshaw is determined to let those at a prominent hotel know that "women such as she had better be left alone", but is quickly recognized and evicted. At the hotel, Fenshaw makes an acquaintance of Bryant Harding who decides to keep her as his mistress and pays Fenshaw's rent in an apartment next door to one of the reformers, Mrs. Osborne. Fenshaw also charms Dudley Carleton, who breaks off his engagement to Betty Hamlin, the daughter of Harding, who uses her divorced mother's maiden name. Hamlin and Fenshaw meet through an introduction with Mrs. Bowers, and Hamlin, unaware of Fenshaw's character is telephoned by Fenshaw to come and sew for her to earn some money. Hal Harding, a college student with a desire to see the city, is introduced to Fenshaw during his father's absence. The cast assembles at Fenshaw's apartment when Hamlin arrives and interrupts Fenshaw's party with her ex-fiancé and her brother, Hal. She is then introduced to her brother under and assumed name and is in the apartment when Bryant Harding returns. A fight breaks out and Harding nearly kills Carleton and knocks Fenshaw unconscious and shoots at his daughter, but misses. Alerted by the shot, the District Attorney, Mrs. Bowers and her reformer friends arrive and learn of Hattie Fenshaw's vice. Shorey's film review concludes with the presumption that Fenshaw returns to a place of "legalized vice" with Mrs. Bowers' permission.

== Cast ==
- Christine Mayo as Hattie Fenshaw
- Anders Randolf as Bryant M. Harding (Richard Harding in Fretz's review)
- Evelyn Brent as Betty Hamlin
- Frank Morgan as Dudley Carlton
- William Sherwood as Hal Harding
- Gladys Fairbanks as Mrs. Bowers
- Franklyn Hanna as District Attorney Osborne
- Mabel Wright as Betty's mother
- George Majeroni (Undetermined role)
- Dean Raymond (Undetermined role)

== Production ==
Willard Mack had registered and copyrighted "Who's Your Neighbor?" on March 9, 1917. Speculation by Motography states that Mack's "contribution to the screen drama was probably prompted by the distressing Ruth Cruger mystery, which was so cleverly solved by Mrs. Grace Humiston, and follows very closely many of the phases of drama in real life that shocked the world." The April 17, 1917 issue of Motography profiled the film, the first production of Master Drama Features, noting that it would be shown on a "stage-right" basis after a New York City premier at a Broadway theater. H. D. Fretz noted that the majority of the scenes were shot indoors and described the photography as excellent. The film was described as breaking a record by Motoplay because of the use of a triple exposure. The brief note stated that it is a delicate and precise work that required perfect synchronization that "(the film) had to be taken twenty times before the result was satisfactory to Director S. Rankin Drew." Who's Your Neighbor? was the first film produced by Edward Small. According to the American Film Institute, the film was edited by Frank Lawrence.

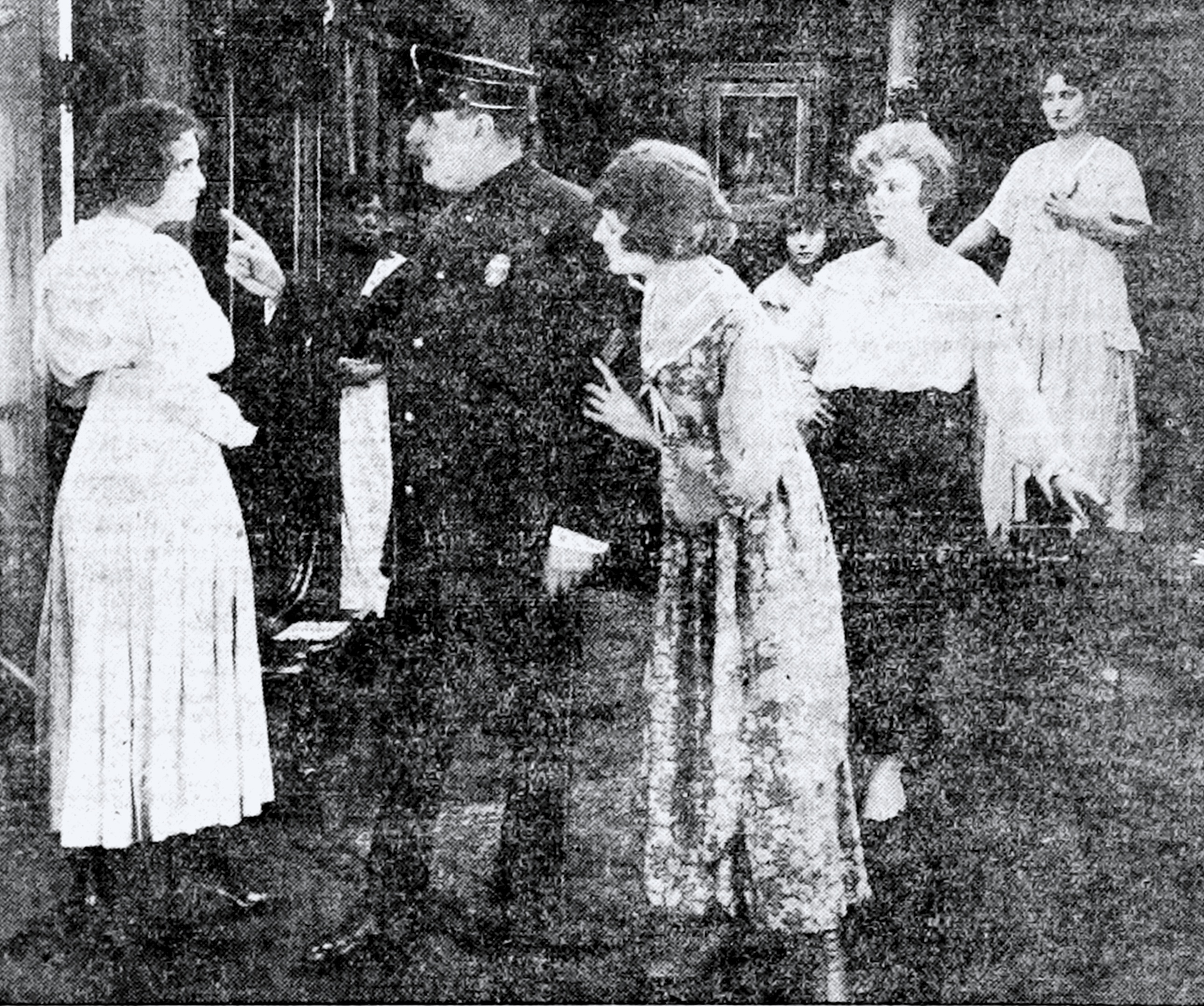
Another scene in film

== Release ==
The film debuted at the Broadway Theater on June 15, 1917. After its debut, the film received many bids from buyers for the film. The original film had seven reels, but the edition of June 30 of The Moving Picture World stated that it was six reels for unknown reasons. Shortly after the film's completion, S. Rankin Drew sailed for France to join the American Ambulance Corps. He was killed in action when his plane was shot down over France during the First World War on May 19, 1918.

The film was originally set for a winter release, and was the subject of speculation by Lynn Kear, author of Evelyn Brent: The Life and Films of Hollywood's Lady Crook, the film was delayed because of the fears that World War I would hurt viewer attendance. Lynn also speculated that it may have been due to the film having received condemnation from the National Board of Review.

Master Drama Features general manager Herman Becker told the media the film was held for a winter release, due to expectation of a decrease in viewership due to the ongoing war, but the film was released because the vaudeville theaters wanted new acts. Becker also noted the advertising greatly boosted sales of the film. While the film did initially get condemnation from the board, it was later given a full approval following a revision according to the September 1 publication of Motion Picture News. The film was also quick to sell the state rights as noted in the edition of July 28 of Motography. Becker sold states rights to "California, Washington, Nevada, Arizona, New Mexico, Colorado, Utah, Wyoming, Montana, Oregon, Idaho and northern New Jersey." This purchase of rights was made by Franklyn Edward Backer of Mammoth Film Corporation after seeing the film.

According to Kear, advertising for the film focused on Evelyn Brent and cited an ad that appeared in the Los Angeles Times on December 5, 1917. Though Exhibitor's Herald cited that the advertising for the film would include "four kinds of one-sheet, three-sheet, six-sheet and 24-sheet lithographs, newspaper cuts, slides, window cards, banners, heralds, throw aways and many other novelties never before seen." For advertisement purposes, the Otis Lithograph Company was contracted by the studio's director of publicity, Arthur M. Brilant. The description of the varied materials were noted in greater detail in a column in Motion Picture News.

Though the film had its debut on June 15, the American Film Institute states that the film was released in October. This conflicts with a claim from the Paris Theater in Denver, Colorado, found in the September 29 issue of Motography, where the film was said to be popular. The Paris Theater would also run into legal troubles over the films showing, a fact reported in the edition of October 6 of Motography. Newspaper accounts for a late October run begin in the San Francisco Chronicle with the Portola Theater debuting the film, originally for one week, starting on October 28, 1917. The film was popular enough to run a second week at the Portola. The film would be part of the vaudeville show at the Wigwam for four days starting on November 14. The film was suggested for mature audiences by the Portola Theater and the Wigwam Theater, both did not allow children under the age of 16 to enter.

== Reception ==
George N. Shorey's review of the initial seven reel Broadway release declared it another masterpiece of Mack's writing and notes that the film would be the best example to go before the courts to argue for "free speech" in films. Shorey notes that the propaganda film "is bold, clear, tremendous in the force of its convincing showing that to drive the scarlet woman from a restricted district into the hotels and apartment houses of a city is a worse crime than it seeks to cure." The only complaint was found that it "does not sufficiently misrepresent the ease and luxury of the underworld. It shows a scarlet woman who finds the "easiest way" truly easy. She does not die, nor even suffer. The intended moral of the picture, that once abandoned to that life a woman finds it to her taste to remain in it and cannot be "reformed", necessarily does include the above corollary to that proposition." The San Francisco Chronicle wrote that the film "deals with a question that has perplexed the sages from the beginning of time and it traverses life's scroll, writing with thought and deed certain actions of everyday application. There are tense dramatic scenes, and above all there is the question that must be faced, "Who's Your Neighbor?""

The film was declared to be the "most satisfactory picture Denver has had in many months" by the Paris Theater in the September 29 issue of Motography. Though the edition of October 6 of Motography noted that W. A. Roderick and F. O. Brown, officers of Paris Theater Company were charged for showing the film which violated a city ordinance on "immoral pictures". The men rejected that claim, citing that it was not immoral, but was rejected by the censorship board because it was a propaganda film and not on the film's morality. The city had threatened to file charges and prosecute them for each exhibition of the film.

Ben H. Grimm's review in The Moving Picture World was completely negative and described it as "one of the most insidious, moral-destroying pictures ever produced. It will lower to the level of a bawdy house any theater in which it is shown. It reeks of a filthy sex element that struts across the screen in the sheep's clothing of alleged propaganda advocating the segregation of vice." Grimm highlights how the film's prostitute sells herself and finds not ill, but instead gets worldly gains. Grimm also notes that the production is based on the premise that a prostitute is a prostitute by choice, does not want reform and infers that she can not be reformed. Grimm's review stated that the great production was even more detrimental with a metaphor that stated a well-dressed criminal was less likely to be suspected than a poorly dressed criminal.

The film is believed to be lost.

== Notes ==
Kear states that film was five reels instead of seven, but an index and listings for the film lists Who's Your Neighbor? as having seven reels even after its revision and approval by the National Board of Review. This claim is also asserted by the American Film Institute.
