= The Spell of the Yukon (film) =

1916 film directed by Burton L. King

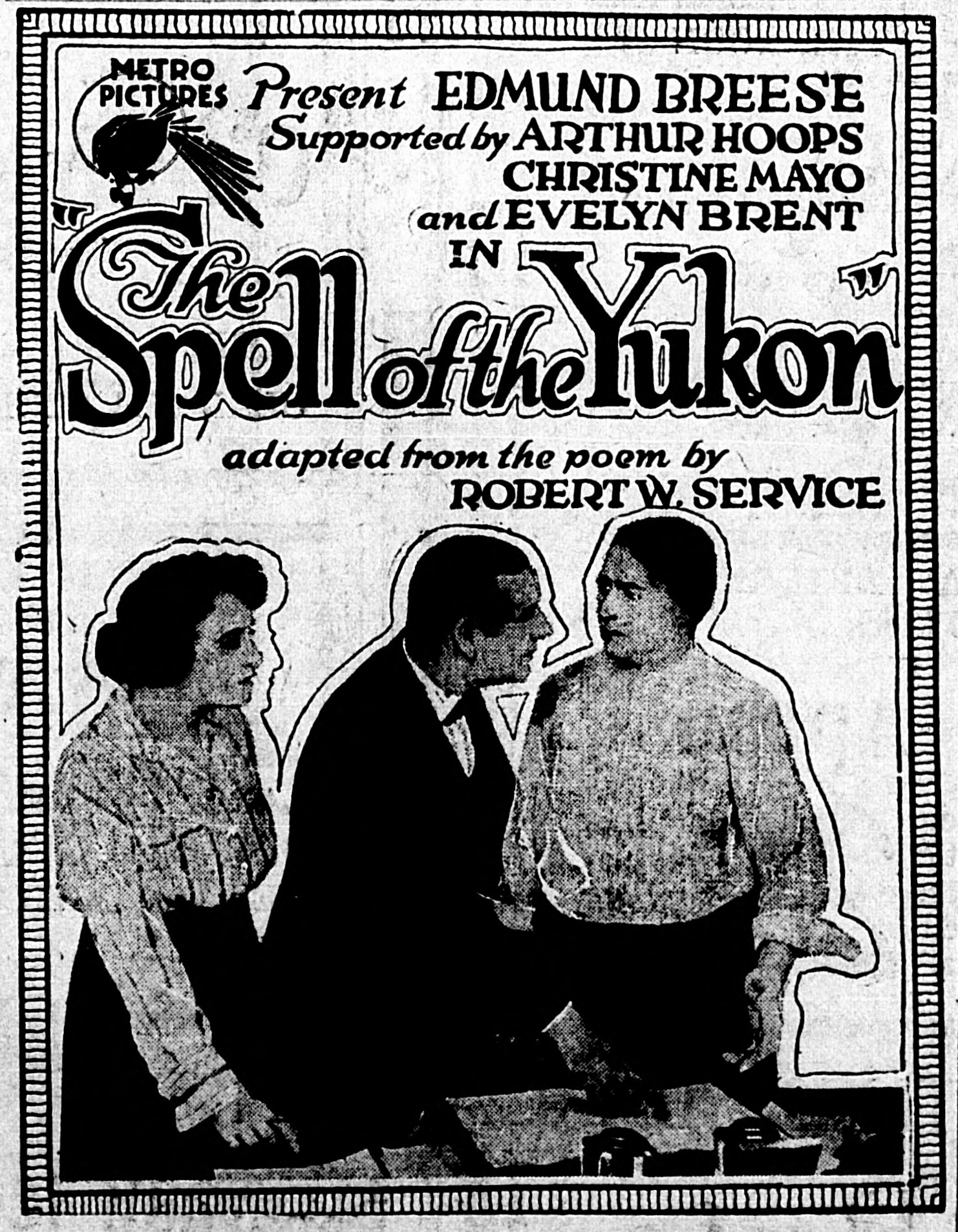
- Newspaper advertisement.
- Directed by: Burton L. King
- Written by: Wallace Clifton; Aaron Hoffman
- Based on: the poem "The Spell of the Yukon" by Robert W. Service
- Produced by: Herbert Blaché; Alice Guy
- Starring: Edmund Breese
- Cinematography: Leo Bergman
- Distributed by: Metro Pictures
- Release date: May 15, 1916
- Running time: Five reels
- Country: United States
- Language: Silent

The Spell of the Yukon is a 1916 American silent American drama film directed by Burton L. King and starring Edmund Breese.

== Cast ==
- Edmund Breese as Jim Carson
- Arthur Hoops as Albert Temple
- Christine Mayo as Helen Temple
- William Sherwood as Bob Adams (as Billy Sherwood)
- Evelyn Brent as Dorothy Temple
- Frank McArthur as Megar
- Joseph S. Chailee as Rusty
- Jacques Suzanne as Billy Denny
- Mary Reed as Yukon Kate
- Harry Moreville as Ike Boring
- Lorna Volare as Bob Adams as a Baby (as Baby Volare)
- Claire Lillian Barry as Undetermined Role
