= Fighting Cressy =

1919 film

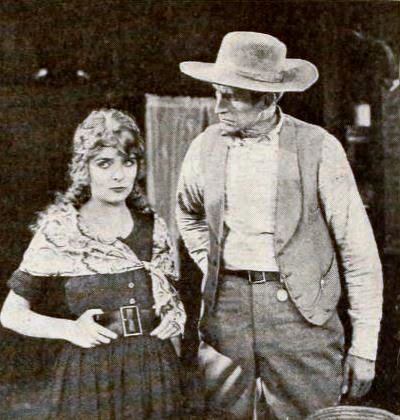
- Blanche Sweet and Russell Simpson
- Directed by: Robert Thornby
- Written by: Fred Myton
- Based on: Cressy (novel) by Bret Harte
- Produced by: Jesse D. Hampton
- Starring: Blanche Sweet
- Cinematography: Charles Kaufman
- Production company: Jesse D. Hampton Productions
- Distributed by: Pathé Exchange
- Release date: January 11, 1920
- Running time: 60 minutes
- Country: United States
- Languages: Silent; English intertitles

Fighting Cressy is a lost 1919 silent Western film directed by Robert Thornby and starring Blanche Sweet. It was produced by Jesse D. Hampton and distributed through Pathé Exchange.

== Plot ==
The film is adapted from Bret Harte's 1889 novel Cressy with a story that unfolds during the California Gold Rush era.

Two families from Kentucky—the McKinstrys and the Harrisons—have migrated west and are squatting on neighboring land claims in search of gold. A long-standing and bitter feud erupts between them over disputed property boundaries, fueling ongoing hostility and tension in the rugged mining community.

At the center of the drama is Cressy McKinstry (Blanche Sweet), a spirited and strong-willed young woman from the McKinstry clan. As the family conflict escalates, Cressy becomes involved in the turmoil, displaying the "fighting" spirit suggested by the title. Romantic complications arise as a suitor (Russell Simpson) enters the picture, falls in love with her and is drawn into the dangerous family rivalry.

== Cast ==
- Blanche Sweet - Cressy
- Russell Simpson - Hiram McKinstry
- Edward Peil, Sr. - John Ford (* as Edward Peil)
- Pell Trenton - Joe Masters
- Antrim Short - Seth Davis
- Frank Lanning - Old Man Harrison
- Billie Bennett - Mrs. Dabney
- Georgie Stone - Georgie
- Walter Perry - Uncle Ben Dabney
- Eunice Murdock Moore - Ma McKinstry (* as Eunice Moore)

== See also ==
- Blanche Sweet filmography
