= Adele Farrington =

American actress (1867–1936)

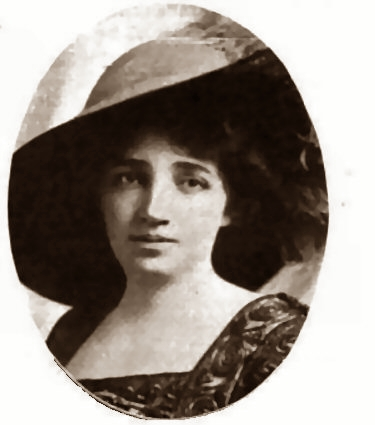
- Photoplay Magazine, 1915
- Born: 1867; Brooklyn, New York City, New York, U.S.
- Died: December, 19 1936 (aged 68–69); Los Angeles, California., U.S.
- Occupation: Actress
- Years active: 1914-1926
- Spouse: Hobart Bosworth

Adele Farrington (1867 - 19 December 1936) was an American actress of the stage and the silent film era.

== Biography ==
Born in Brooklyn, New York, Farrington had the lead in This Is the Life (1915) for the American Film Company. She also did her own stunts for the film.

== Personal life and death ==
Farrington was married to, and divorced from, actor Hobart Bosworth. Her relationship with Bosworth led to his divorce from a previous wife in 1903. In the divorce suit, the keeper of a boardinghouse testified that Bosworth and Farrington had represented themselves to her as husband and wife when they lodged there. Bosworth offered no defense in that suit.

On December 19, 1936, Farrington died in Los Angeles at age 69. Her body was cremated following the funeral two days later.

== Selected filmography ==
- False Colors (1914)
- It's No Laughing Matter (1915)
- Hypocrites (1915)
- The Devil's Bondwoman (1916)
- Her Defiance (1916)
- The Love Girl (1916)
- The Mate of the Sally Ann (1917)
- The House of Silence (1918)
- Such a Little Pirate (1918)
- Putting It Over (1919)
- A Fugitive from Matrimony (1919)
- In Old Kentucky (1919)
- Too Much Johnson (1919)
- The Mollycoddle (1920)
- The Girl in the Web (1920)
- Rio Grande (1920)
- One Hour Before Dawn (1920)
- The Palace of Darkened Windows (1920)
- Black Beauty (1921)
- The Child Thou Gavest Me (1921)
- Her Mad Bargain (1921)
- The Spenders (1921)
- The Charm School (1921)
- A Connecticut Yankee in King Arthur's Court (1921)
- Bobbed Hair (1922)
- Little Wildcat (1922)
- The Scarlet Lily (1923)
- One Stolen Night (1923)
- Bag and Baggage (1923)
- The Man Next Door (1923)
- A Gentleman of Leisure (1923)
- Shadow of the Law (1926)
- The Traffic Cop (1926)
