= Jacques Suzanne =

American actor

Jacques Albert Suzanne, Sr.
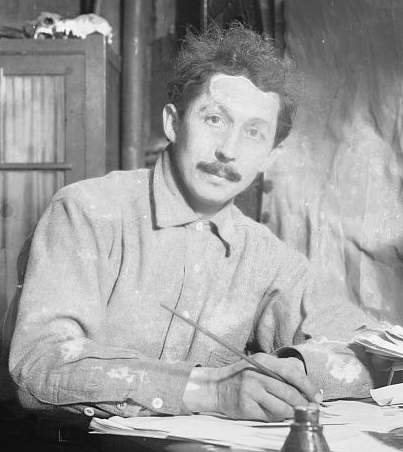
- Born: April 17, 1880; Trouville-sur-Mer, Normandy, France
- Died: August 1, 1967 (aged 87); Lake Placid, New York
- Spouse: Juliette DuChemin (m. 1903; died 1904)

Jacques Albert Suzanne (April 17, 1880 - August 1, 1967) was a French painter, artist, pianist, actor and explorer.

== Biography ==
Suzanne was born Albert Jacques Suzanne April 17, 1880, in Trouville-sur-Mer, Normandy, France. He trained in fine arts at the Le Havre art school.

He married Juliette Isabelle Emma DuChemin on December 5, 1903, and they had a daughter Isabelle. After his first wife died in childbirth he migrated to the United States arriving through Ellis Island October 21, 1905.

He claims to have attempted to reach the North Pole but gave when up when Robert Peary made it in 1909.

He married Hannah Moynihan in the early 1930s and had four children: Pierre, Jacques Albert Suzanne, Jr. (born 1934), Ninon and Anna. They lived in Lake Placid, New York, where he bred husky dogs for film and tourism purposes. He appeared in several films including Out of Snows (1916) and The Spell of the Yukon (1916)

He had a great friend Noah John Rondeau, a well known hermit of the area.

He died on August 1, 1967, in Lake Placid, New York. He was buried in North Elba near his friend Noah, who died 23 days later.
