= Bianca (1913 film) =

- Directed by: Robert Thornby
- Written by: Hanson Durham
- Produced by: Vitagraph Company of America
- Starring: George Cooper
- Distributed by: General Film Company
- Release date: 1913
- Running time: Short
- Country: United States
- Languages: Silent film English intertitles

Bianca is a 1913 silent American short film, written by Hanson Durham, and directed by Robert Thornby.

== Cast ==
- George Cooper
- George Kunkel
- Patricia Palmer
