= The Girl in the Web =

1920 film

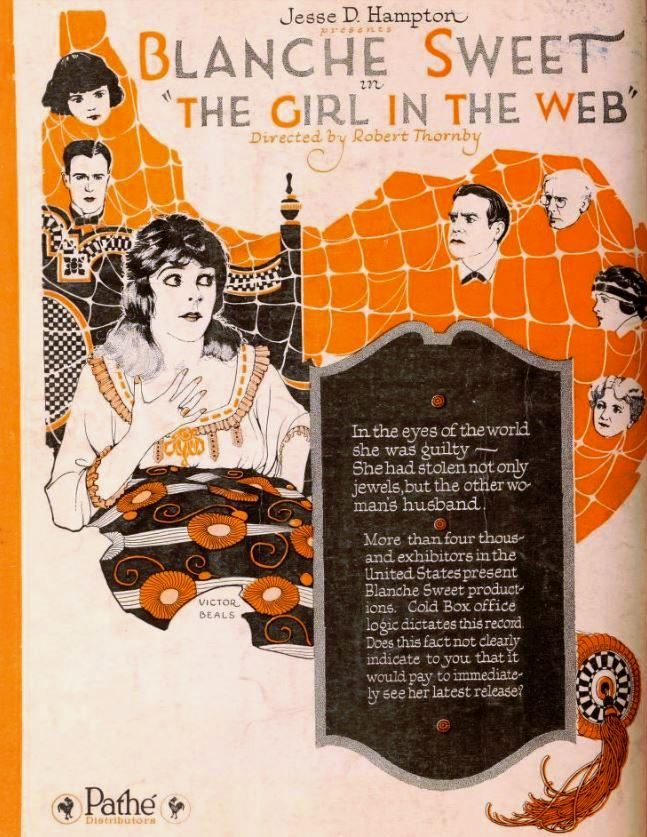
- Trade advertisement
- Directed by: Robert Thornby
- Written by: Waldemar Young
- Based on: Miss Maitland, Private Secretary by Geraldine Bonner
- Produced by: Jesse D. Hampton
- Starring: Blanche Sweet; Nigel Barrie; Adele Farrington
- Cinematography: Charles E. Kaufman
- Production company: Jesse D. Hampton Productions
- Distributed by: Pathé Exchange
- Release date: August 5, 1920
- Running time: 6 reels
- Country: United States
- Language: Silent (English intertitles)

The Girl in the Web is a 1920 American silent mystery film directed by Robert Thornby and starring Blanche Sweet, Nigel Barrie, and Adele Farrington.

== Cast ==
- Blanche Sweet as Esther Maitland
- Nigel Barrie as Dick Ferguson
- Thomas Jefferson as Samuel Van Zile Janney
- Adele Farrington as Mrs. Janney
- Hayward Mack as Chapman Price
- Christine Mayo as Mrs. Price
- Peaches Jackson as Bebita

== Preservation ==
No prints of this film survive so it is a lost film.

== Bibliography ==
- Monaco, James. The Encyclopedia of Film. Perigee Books, 1991.
