= A Mother's Confession =

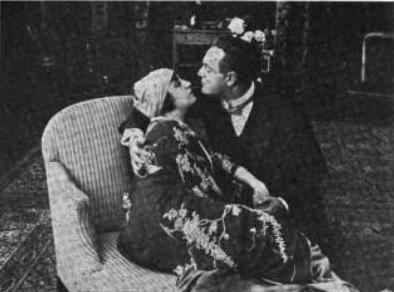
- Directed by: Ivan Abramson
- Written by: Ivan Abramson
- Produced by: Ivan Film Productions
- Starring: Christine Mayo and Austin Webb
- Release date: August 1915
- Running time: 5 reels (approximately 50 minutes)
- Country: United States
- Languages: Silent film English intertitles

A Mother's Confession is a 1915 silent film written and directed by Ivan Abramson, and starring Christine Mayo and Austin Webb.

== Plot and background ==
Typical of Ivan Abramson's exploitation dramas, this film chooses to explore the ills of illegal marriage. Henry Patterson, played by Otto Kruger, is married to Lola (Christine Mayo) and living in Chicago with their young son Harold. But Henry also marries rich heiress Louise Douglas in Denver (where he finds his mining interests to be worthless) to save his family from poverty. Both wives are kept in the dark about this bigamy. When Henry returns years later and confesses to Lola, he is accidentally killed by Lola's friend (and love interest) Fred Warren. Lola marries Fred after he is found not guilty of murder. Later, Lola's son falls in love with his half-sister Muriel Warren, and Lola rushes to stop the marriage—confessing her sins to the priest. Muriel becomes a nun, and Lola goes to live with Harold.

The film was banned by the British Board of Film Censors in 1916.

Chadwick Pictures re-released a re-edited version of the film in 1920 as A Wife's Story.

== Cast ==
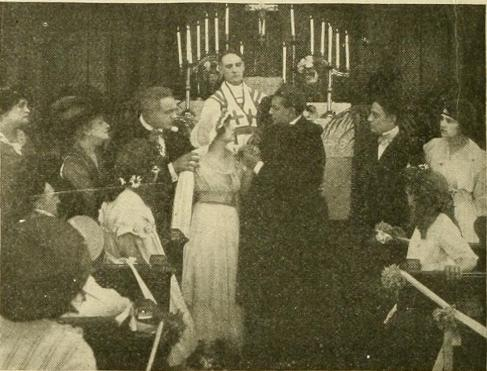
The wedding scene in A Mother's Confession

- Christine Mayo as Lola Patterson
- Austin Webb as Fred Warren
- Otto Kruger as Henry Patterson
- Margaret Adair as Muriel Warren
- Carrie Reynolds
- Sidney L. Mason
- Ned Nye
