= Christine Mayo =

American actress

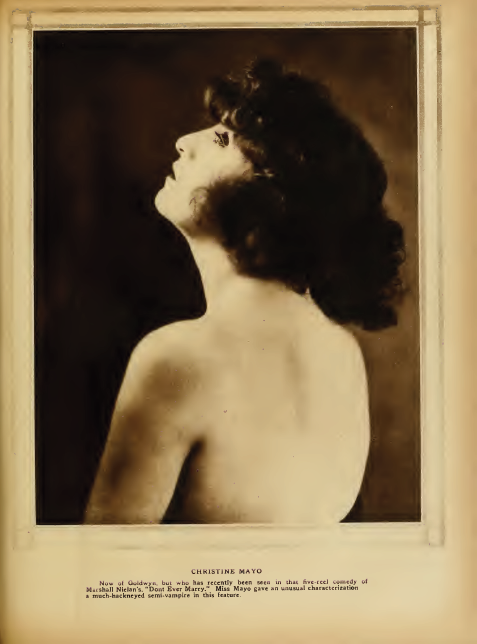
- Motion Picture Classic, 1920
- Born: December 25, 1883; Jersey City, New Jersey, U.S.
- Died: January 9, 1961 (aged 77); New York City, U.S.
- Occupation: Actress
- Years active: 1915–1924

Christine Mayo (December 25, 1883 – January 9, 1961) was a silent film actress.

== Biography ==
Mayo was featured in vamp roles produced by Fox Film Corporation, Metro Pictures, World Film Corporation, and Ivan Film Productions, Inc. Mayo's motion picture career was launched when she won a New York Telegraph contest as the most beautiful girl in New York.

In The Spell of the Yukon (1916), she had the leading female part in a feature starring Edmund Breese, which was adapted from a poem by Robert W. Service. Service was known as the "Kipling of the North." Mayo performed the role of Hattie Fenshaw in Who's Your Neighbor? (1917).

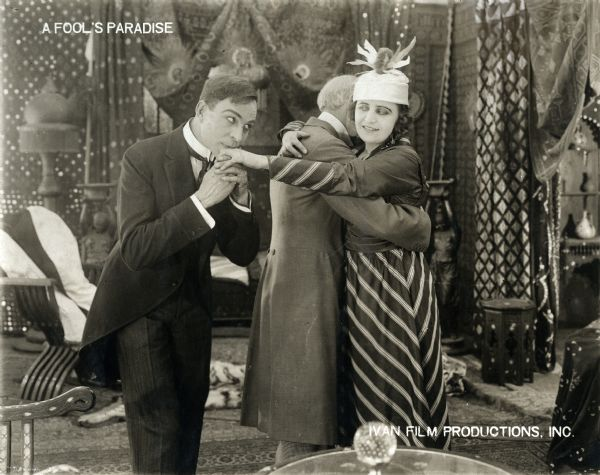
James Cooley kisses Mayo's hand behind the back of Joseph Burke in a still from A Fool's Paradise (1916)

International spy Dr. Karl Graves was arrested in Lima, Ohio, where he traveled after watching Mayo perform at the Empire Theater in New York City. Graves authored Revelations of the Kaiser's Personal Spy. Mayo was in Lima with her manager, Phil Selznik, when Graves was apprehended, stopping first in Bucyrus, Ohio, when she left New York.

Portsmouth, Ohio was one of the thirty American cities Mayo toured in 1917. After the screening of one of her feature films, she discussed her movie career with the audience. A reception was held in the lobby of the Columbia Theater in Portsmouth. Aside from promoting movies, Mayo utilized her tour to recruit troops for service in World War I and to sell Liberty Bonds. She was assigned to the recruiting department of the U.S. Navy. She received a solid gold medal representing the American flag from the hospital corps in recognition of her service to the government. Mayo was one of the first women of the stage to be awarded the right to wear the button of the Liberty Legion.

Mayo plays the scatterbrained Mrs. Chadwick in The Hottentot (1922). One reviewer complimented her acting as a "bright characterization". In the 1923 feature The Shock, starring Lon Chaney, Mayo was compared to Mary Alden in her rendition of Ann Cardington, queen of the underworld. The same year, she was also cast as a supporting player in Don't Marry for Money, along with Edith Yorke and Charles Wellesley.

Mayo appeared with some of the most popular actors of her era. She made For Sale (1924) with Adolphe Menjou, Tully Marshall, and Vera Reynolds. The New York Times reviewed the movie unfavorably, comparing it to a discarded Daisy Ashford effort. The heroine resides in a mansion of Louvre-like dimensions. When her father loses his wealth entirely, he comes up with the idea of having his daughter, Claire Windsor, marry a profligate, a rich one.

Mayo was in the troupe of the Wilkes Stock Company in April 1929 at the Majestic Theater in Los Angeles, California. She joined Edward Everett Horton in a stage production of The Hottentot.

Mayo enjoyed cooking chicken a la king, interior decorating, and reading classic novels by Balzac and Alexandre Dumas.

== Selected filmography ==
- A Mother's Confession (1915)
- The Spell of the Yukon (1916)
- The Iron Woman (1916)
- Two Men and a Woman (1917)
- Who's Your Neighbor? (1917)
- Raffles, the Amateur Cracksman (1917)
- A Successful Adventure (1918)
- The House of Mirth (1918)
- Fair and Warmer (1919)
- A Fugitive from Matrimony (1919)
- Duds (1920)
- An Amateur Devil (1920)
- The Girl in the Web (1920)
- The Palace of Darkened Windows (1920)
- Don't Ever Marry (1920)
- When We Were 21 (1921)
- The Understudy (1922)
- A Dangerous Game (1922)
- The Hottentot (1922)
- The Shock (1923)
- Don't Marry for Money (1923)
- For Sale (1924)
