= For Sale (1924 film) =

1924 film by George Archainbaud

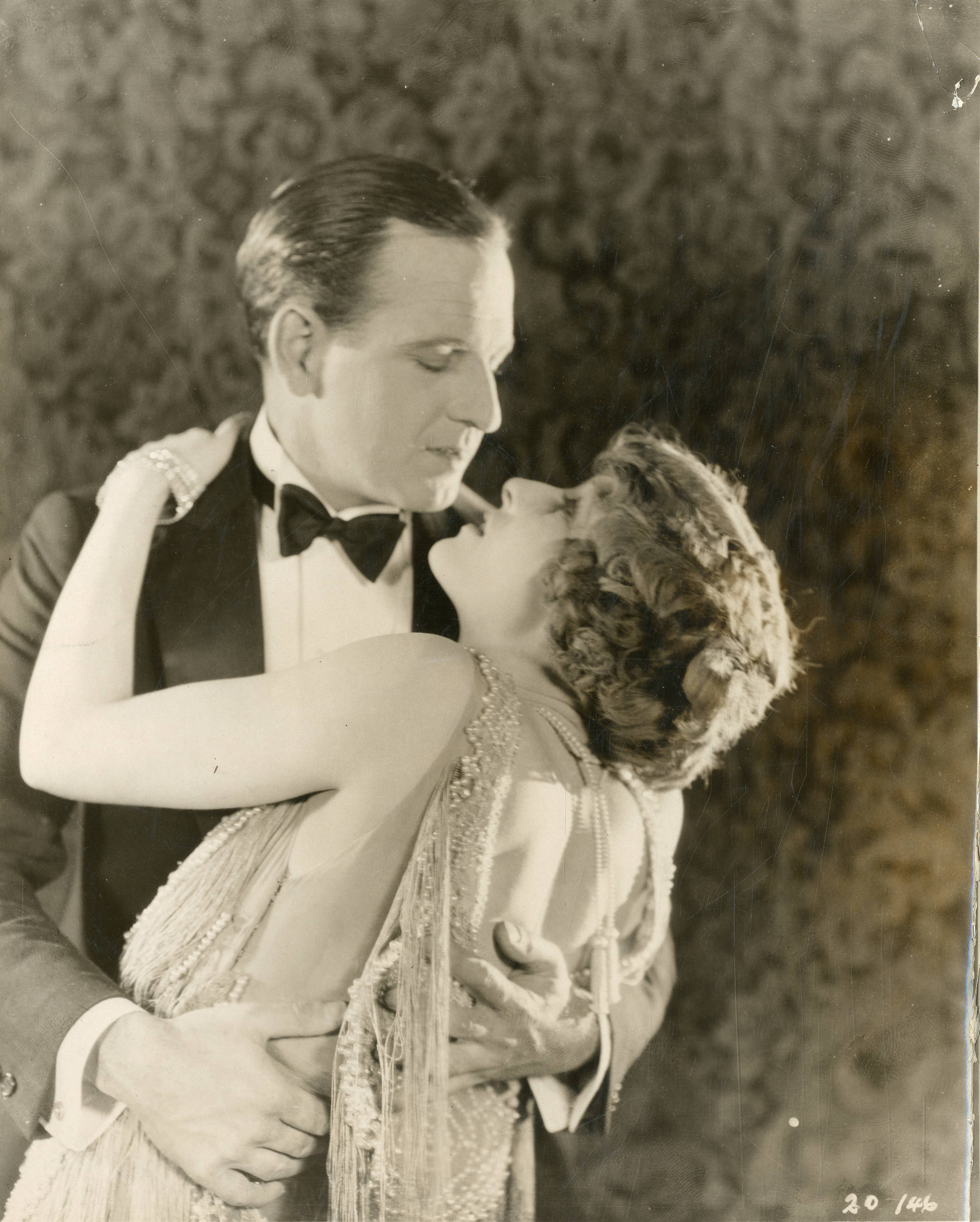
- Film still
- Directed by: George Archainbaud
- Screenplay by: Fred Stanley
- Story by: Earl Hudson
- Starring: Claire Windsor; Adolphe Menjou; Robert Ellis; Mary Carr; Tully Marshall; John Patrick
- Cinematography: Ted McCord
- Edited by: George McGuire
- Production company: Associated First National Pictures
- Distributed by: Associated First National Pictures
- Release date: June 15, 1924
- Running time: 80 minutes
- Country: United States
- Language: Silent (English intertitles)

For Sale is a 1924 American silent drama film directed by George Archainbaud and written by Fred Stanley. The film stars Claire Windsor, Adolphe Menjou, Robert Ellis, Mary Carr, Tully Marshall, and John Patrick. The film was released on June 15, 1924, by Associated First National Pictures.

== Cast ==
- Claire Windsor as Eleanor Bates
- Adolphe Menjou as Joseph Hudley
- Robert Ellis as Alan Penfield
- Mary Carr as Mrs. Harrison Bates
- Tully Marshall as Harrison Bates
- John Patrick as Cabot Stanton
- Vera Reynolds as Betty Twombly-Smith
- Jule Power as Mrs. Twombly-Smith
- Louis Payne as Mr. Twombly-Smith
- Phillips Smalley as Mr. Winslow
- Christine Mayo as Mrs. Winslow
- Jean Vachon as The Flapper
- George Irving as Eric Porter
- Frank Elliott as Sir John Geddes
- Frank Finch Smiles as Butler
- Marga Rubia Levy as Demimondaine

== Preservation ==
With no copies of For Sale located in any film archives, it is a lost film.
