= Carrie Reynolds =

American actress

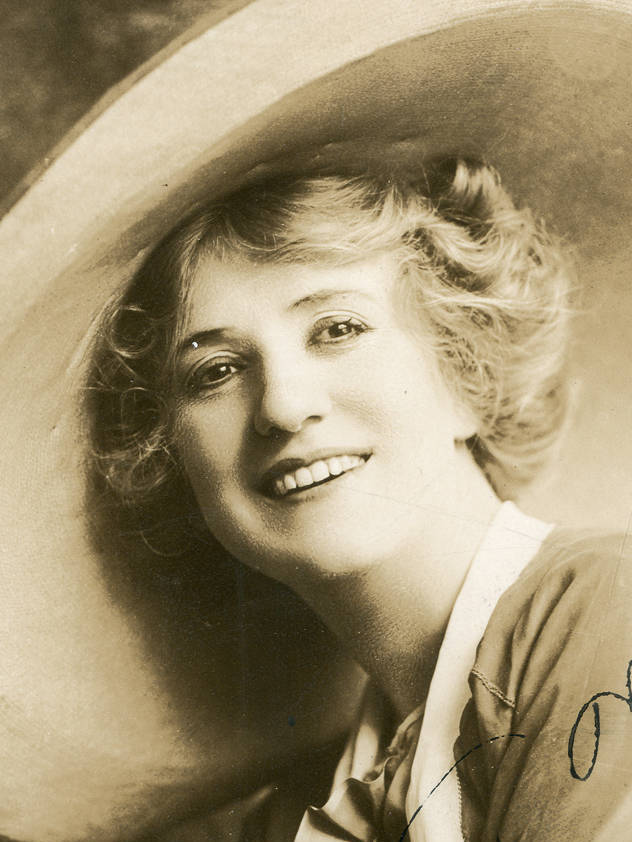
- Carrie Reynolds, circa 1912
- Born: Carrie Kerber Reynolds; Philadelphia, Pennsylvania, U.S.
- Occupations: Dancer, actress
- Spouse(s): Harry A. Weigand (m. 1897; div. 1912); Fred G. Ross (m. 1913; died 1942)

Carrie Kerber Reynolds (October 6, 1887) was an American stage actress in Broadway shows from the late 19th until the early 20th century. She was described as "a graceful and striking blonde" and "a dainty and winsome actress." She was trained in light opera.

== Career ==
Born in Philadelphia, Pennsylvania on October 6, 1877, Reynolds was one of four children born to Mary (née Lawser) and Joseph Reynolds.

Reynolds began her stage career with the Castle Square Opera Company. Reynolds was associated with the Rogers Brothers' companies for a number of seasons before she sang the prima donna role in The School Girl. It was presented by Daly's Theatre, 1221 Broadway (Manhattan) (30th Street), before touring on the road.

She was in the company of The Newlyweds and Their Baby, a comedy based on the cartoons of George McManus. It premiered at the Majestic Theatre, Broadway (Manhattan) on March 22, 1909. The plot dealt with Mr. and Mrs. Newlywed and Napoleon Newlywed, the baby. Reynolds depicted Dolly Jolly, a woman who was coveted by the character played by Fletcher Norton.

She entered the cast of In Hayti in mid September 1909, singing the role of the actress. Written by John J. McNally, the theatrical was presented by the Montauk Theatre in Brooklyn, New York. The troupe included a chorus of sixty girls and the comedians McIntyre and Heath.

Reynolds performed in King Dodo at the Plaza Music Hall in July 1910. It was the second week of the Aborn Comic Opera's engagement there. Robert Lett acted the title role with Agnes Finlay among the players. Reynolds appeared in The Red Rose at the Globe Theatre (Lunt-Fontanne Theatre) in June 1911. The venue featured an open roof and a system of cooling the air for comfort on hot summer nights. Valeska Suratt starred in the production. The Red Rose was her final New York appearance in a leading soubrette role.

In November 1911 the cast for Jacinta, an opera comique by Heinrich Berté, was announced by John Cort. Reynolds was a principal in the company for the play which was to debut in Providence, Rhode Island on November 27. The production first played in Europe under a different title. It was adapted from a book by Ignatz Schnitzer and Emerich von Gatti. In December she retired from the opera comique and entered vaudeville in a single act.

She acted with Robert Warwick at the West End Theatre, in The Kiss Waltz, in March 1912. The Blue Envelope was staged at the Cort Theatre in March 1916. The comedy was written by Frank Hatch and Robert E. Homans. Walter Jones, Beth Franklyn, Reynolds, and Belle Theodore were some of the actors in the cast. As The Angel, Reynolds was an adventuress whose actions were eventually frustrated. A critic observed that her background in light opera was somewhat of a hindrance in this role. Specifically, she sang all her speeches and her very empty laugh sounded discomforting after a while.

In film, she appeared in A Mother's Confession (1915) for Ivan Film Productions, and several Lubin Studios productions, based in her hometown of Philadelphia, including An Accident Policy, His Wife's New Lid, and Blaming the Duck, or Ducking the Blame in 1915, and A Skate for the Bride and Insomnia in 1916.

== Personal life ==
On August 16, 1897, in Delaware City, Delaware, Reynolds married another Philadelphia-based performer, Harry A. Wiegand. She successfully sued for divorce in 1912. From 1913 until his death in 1942, she was married to New York-based, San Francisco-born actor and manager, Fred G. Ross.

== Partial filmography ==
- A Mother's Confession (1915)
- Half a Million (1915)
- An Accident Policy (1915)
- His Wife's New Lid (1915)
- Blaming the Duck, or Ducking the Blame (1915)
- Which Is Which? (1915)
- Playing the Same Game (1915)
- Bashful Billie (1915)
- An Unwilling Burglar (1915)
- Beyond All Is Love (1915)
