= The Blazing Trail (1921 film) =

1921 film

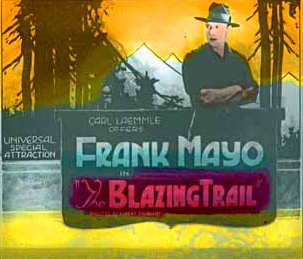
- Lantern slide
- Directed by: Robert Thornby
- Screenplay by: Lucien Hubbard (scenario)
- Based on: The Truant by Mann Page and Izola Forrester
- Produced by: Carl Laemmle
- Starring: Frank Mayo; Frank Holland; Verne Winter
- Cinematography: William E. Fildew
- Production company: Universal Film Manufacturing Co.
- Release date: May 1921 (US)
- Running time: 5 reels
- Country: United States
- Language: Silent (English intertitles)

The Blazing Trail is a 1921 American silent melodrama film directed by Robert Thornby and starring Frank Mayo, Frank Holland, and Verne Winter. It was released in May 1921. A print of The Blazing Trail exists in the Academy Film Archive.

== Plot ==
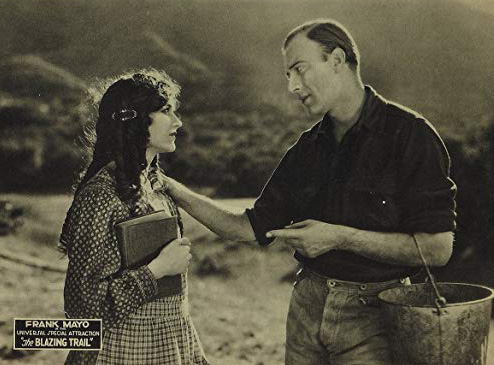
Philbin and Mayo

Bradley Yates is a talented doctor who is working on a serum for blood poisoning. He has worked so hard on it that he is on the verge of a physical breakdown. He decides to take some time off to rest and recuperate and heads down to the beautiful mountains of Kentucky. Upon his arrival there he takes on the persona of Brad Pickins, a woodcutter. As Pickins he begins a friendly relationship with a young woman from the community, Talithy Millicuddy. Since there is no school, Bradley begins to give Talithy books to study, and helps her. Talithy, however, is looking for more than friendship.

Shortly later, a state mandated schoolteacher, Carroll Brown, arrives and opens up the local schoolhouse. Very soon after her arrival she and Bradley begin a romantic relationship. Bradley's partner, Pickney Forbes, arrives, and brings some of Bradley's serum which is now perfected.

Talithy's family takes umbrage of the new relationship between Carroll and Bradley, feeling that Bradley led Talithy on, although that could not be further from the truth. When one of the locals takes it upon themselves and gives Carroll a case of food poisoning to get her out of the way, Bradley gets his serum and attempts to head to Carroll's bedside. He is prevented from doing so, when he finds his cabin surrounded by a group of Talithy's angry relatives. The impasse is broken when another townsperson comes forward and vouches that Bradley did nothing wrong, merely befriending the young girl. Bradley takes off and arrives at Carroll's cabin in time to successfully administer the serum.

== Cast ==
- Frank Mayo as Bradley Yates (aka Pickins)
- Frank Holland as Dr. Pickney Forbes
- Verne Winter as Chipmunk Grannis
- Bert Sprotte as Hank Millicuddy
- Madge Hunt as Ma Millicuddy
- Mary Philbin as Talithy Millicuddy
- Lillian Rich as Carroll Brown
- Ray Ripley as Lewis Van Dusen
- Joy Winthrop as Hulda Mews
- Helen Gilmore as The Village Talking Machine

== Production ==
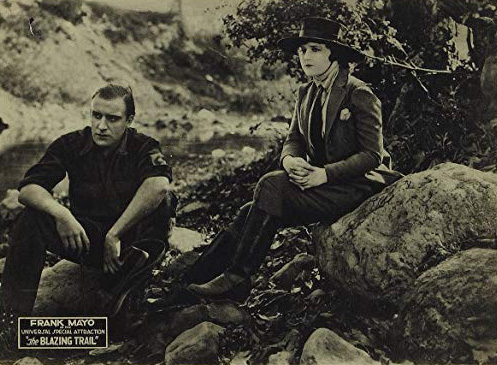
Mayo and Rich

In January 1921, Universal announced they had purchased the rights to the novel, The Truant, written by Izola Forrester and Mann Page. At the same time they revealed that Frank Mayo had been attached to the project, which had been purchased as a vehicle for the actor. Production on the film was supposed to begin as quickly as the story could be put into screenplay format. The previous year, Universal had discovered a young actress, Gertrude Olmstead, through a national beauty contest held at the Elks Club national convention. Mary Philbin was the runner-up in that competition, and she was chosen to play a supporting role in the film. By the end of February it was learned that Robert Thornby would handle the direction of the film. In early March Universal announced that Lillian Rich would be one of Mayo's co-stars in the film. By mid-March 1921 the film was in production. For the film a replica of an entire Kentucky town was constructed in Topanga Canyon, outside of Los Angeles.

Around the same time it was revealed that Lucien Hubbard had handled adapting the Forrestor/Page story for the screen. Frank Hollard, Verne Winter, Bert Sprotte, Ray Ripley, Joe Winthrop, and Helen Gilmore were announced as members of the cast. By mid-April 1921 the project had been renamed The Valley of the Rogues. This was a short-lived development and it was quickly renamed once again, this time to The Blazing Trail.

== Reception ==
Motion Picture News gave the film a lukewarm review. They found significant deficiencies in the plot, direction, and cinematography, but applauded the efforts of the cast, taking time to specifically highlight the work of Philbin. The Moving Picture World was kinder to the film, calling it "a feature of marked entertainment value". They praised Mayo's performance, and commented that the rest of the cast "that enhances the worth of the story immeasurably." They complimented the work of the scenarist and director, and especially complimented the cinematography.
