= False Colors (1914 film) =

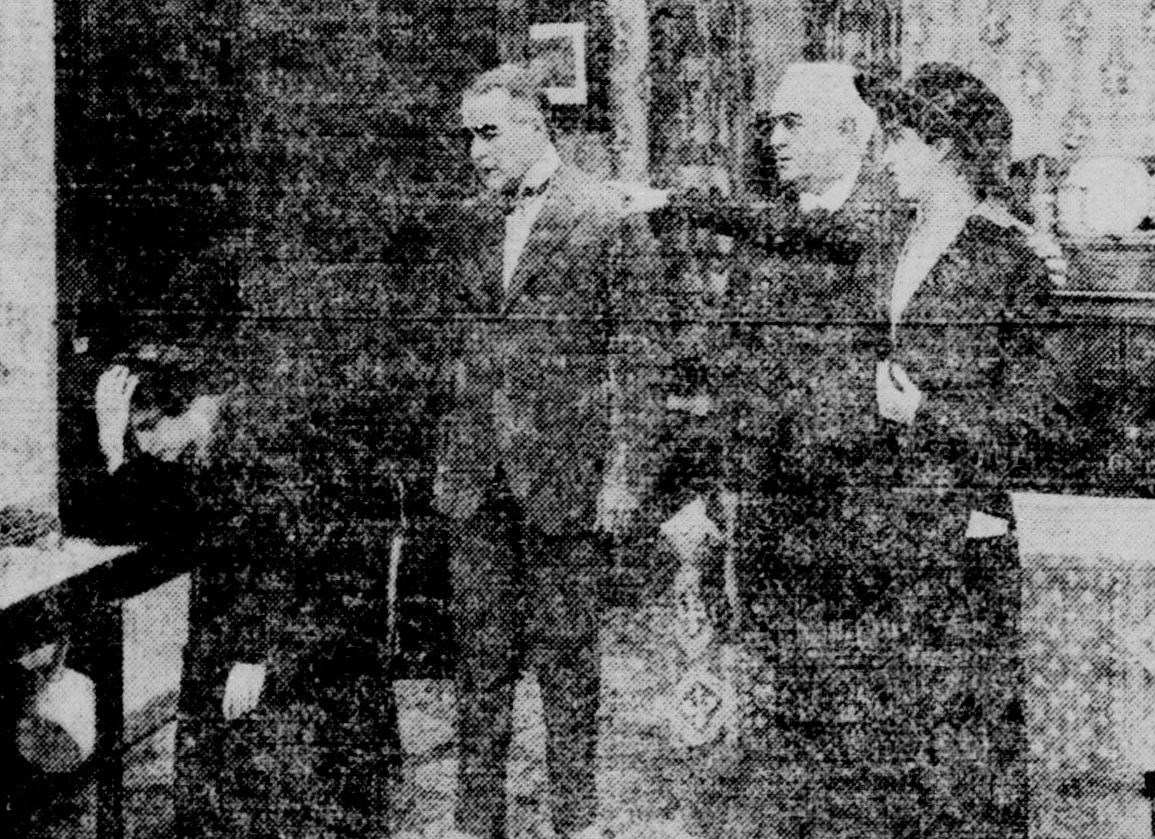
- Contemporary publicity photo
- Directed by: Lois Weber; Phillips Smalley
- Written by: Lois Weber; Phillips Smalley
- Starring: Lois Weber; Phillips Smalley
- Distributed by: Paramount Pictures
- Release date: December 17, 1914
- Running time: 4 reels; 32 minutes
- Country: United States
- Language: Silent (English intertitles)

False Colors, also known as False Colours, is a surviving 1914 American silent drama film directed, written by and starring Lois Weber and her husband Phillips Smalley. Weber plays dual roles of a mother and her daughter.

== Cast ==
- Lois Weber as Mrs. Moore / Her daughter Flo
- Phillips Smalley as Lloyd Phillips
- Dixie Carr as Dixie Phillips
- Adele Farrington as Mrs. Hughes, housekeeper
- Charles Marriott as Butler (Mr. Hughes)
- Courtenay Foote as Bert Hughes, son of Butler and Housekeeper
- Herbert Standing as Marc Herbert

== Production ==
Double exposures are used in the film to indicate transitions in scenes where Lloyd dreams of his dead wife, played by Weber, followed by the entrance of the daughter Flo, also played by Weber. Later, after his affection has shifted to his daughter, he sees Flo's image superimposed over a picture of his wife.

== Preservation status ==
A partial print of False Colors consisting of two reels is preserved in the Library of Congress collection.

== See also ==
- List of Paramount Pictures films
