= Marah Ellis Ryan =

American novelist

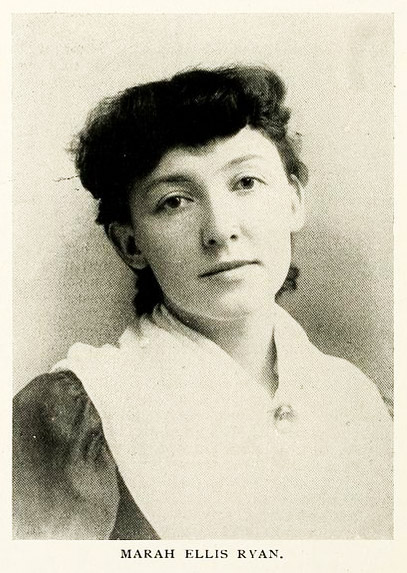
Marah Ellis Ryan, c. 1897

Marah Ellis Ryan (née Martin; February 27, 1860 or 1866 – July 11, 1934), also known as Ellis Martin, was an author, actress, and activist from the United States. She was considered an authority on Native Americans after living with the Hopi.

== Biography ==
Ryan was born in Butler County, Pennsylvania, to Graham and Sidney Mechling Martin. She started her career under the pen name of Ellis Martin, writing a few poems and stories. She married Samuel Erwin Ryan (b. 1834), an Irish actor and comedian, in 1883. She became a popular author, writing numerous novels during the period 1889–1925.

Around 1909, she went to live among the Hopi in Arizona. According to the New York Times, Ryan "claimed to be the only white woman ever admitted to the secret religious rites. She was noted as an authority on the tribal life of the Indians in the United States and Mexico."

She died in Los Angeles of encephalitis at the age of 68.

== Bibliography ==
- Merze: the story of an actress; Chicago, New York: Rand, McNally, 1888 and 1894, according to abebooks, 1889 according to the Melvyl catalog
- In loves' domains: a trilogy; Chicago: Rand, McNally, c1889
- Told in the hills; Chicago; New York: Rand, McNally, [1891], Rand, McNally, [1905] ("a romance and melodrama, set in New Orleans and the Pacific Northwest"—ABEBooks)
- A Pagan of the Alleghanies; Chicago and New York, Rand, McNally, [1891]
- Squaw Elouise; Chicago; New York: Rand, McNally, [1892]
- A flower of France: a story of old Louisiana; Chicago: Rand, McNally & Company [1894], Freeport, N. Y., Books for Libraries Press, [1972]
- A chance child: Comrades, Hendrex and Margotte, and Persephone: being four tales; Chicago; New York: Rand, McNally, [1896]
- The bondwoman; Chicago; New York: Rand, McNally, [1899]
- That girl Montana; Rand McNally & Company, [1901], New York, Grosset & Dunlap [c1901]
- Miss Moccasins; Chicago: Rand, McNally, [c1904]
- My Quaker maid; Chicago; New York: Rand McNally & Company, [1906]
- Indian love letters; Chicago: A.C. McClurg & Co., [1907]
- The flute of the gods, illustrated by Edward S. Curtis; New York, F.A. Stokes company [1909]
- For the soul of Rafael; with many illustrations from photographs taken expressly for this book, by Harold A. Taylor; decorative designs by Ralph Fletcher Seymour; Chicago: A.C. McClurg & Co., [1906]
- The woman of the twilight; the story of a story; illustrations by Hanson Booth; Chicago, A.C. McClurg & Co., [1913]
- Pagan prayers ; Chicago: A.C. McClurg, [1913]
- The house of the dawn; illustrated and decorated by Hanson Booth; Chicago: A.C. McClurg, [1914] ("A highly romanticized novel involving a Hopi woman who has traveled far and returned to the mesas, a couple in love in the southwest and their travails, the inquisition, and the Pueblo Revolt of 1680."—ABEBooks)
- The Druid path ; decorated by Will Vreeland; Chicago, A. C. McClurg & Co. [1917]
- The treasure trail: a romance of the land of gold and sunshine; illustrated by Robert Amick; Chicago: A.C. McClurg & Co., [1919], [c1918]
- First Americans; Los Angeles: Calif. Indian Welfare League, [1922]
- The dancer of Tuluum, illustrated by Rene Kinga, decorations by Kay Roberts; Chicago, A. C. McClurg & Co., [1924—no listing in CCR, not renewed]

== Translate works ==
- Preghiere pagane, Lulu Press, Raleigh (NC), 2018, Italian version of Pagan prayers (1913), translated by the Rev. Marco Lupi Speranza, ISBN 978-0-24-470921-1.
