= Clara Bow filmography =

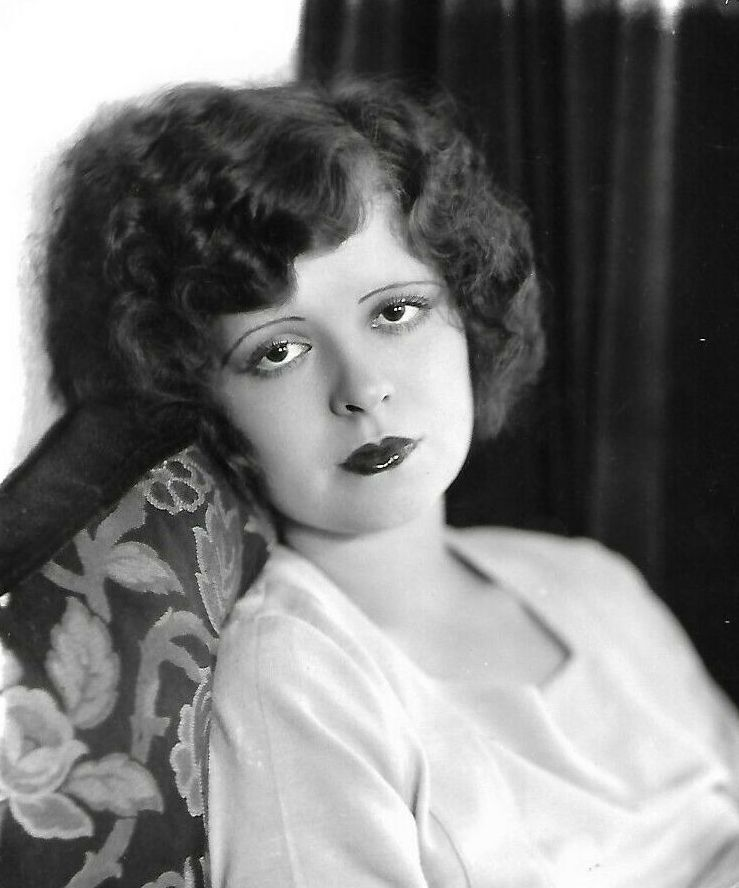
Bow in the 1930s

Clara Bow (1905–1965) was a 16-year-old living in the New York City borough of Brooklyn when she won the 1921 nationwide "Fame and Fortune Contest" advertised in Motion Picture Magazine. After submitting their autobiography with a completed entry form clipped from the magazine, finalists were given multiple screen tests. As the winner, she was cast in a small role in the silent era film Beyond the Rainbow. Although her part was eventually edited out, the contest inspired her to pursue an acting career. She relocated to Los Angeles and in 1923 signed with producer B.P. Schulberg. Over the next seven years, she would make more than 40 silent-era films, the majority of them under contract to Paramount Pictures. Her 1927 starring role in It, about an attractive and charismatic young woman, led the public to label Bow the "It girl".

The 1927 film Wings, in which she co-starred with Charles "Buddy" Rogers, won the first Academy Award for Best Picture in 1929. Paramount initially released it as a silent film, to accommodate smaller regional theaters that were not yet equipped for sound. They would later release a sound version, informally referred to as a "talkie".

Two of her other Paramount films, The Wild Party and The Saturday Night Kid, were also released in both silent and "talkie" formats. Paramount had a special department for the sole purpose of counting and answering every incoming fan letter. Named the film industry's top box office draw, her admirers flooded Paramount every month with an average of 30,000 fan letters.

Bow dreaded the transition to sound in films, as she never lost her Brooklyn accent and speech patterns, and was convinced that the new technology would be the end of her career. The studio arranged a special public appearance for her when the "talkie" version of The Wild Party opened at the 4,200-seat Brooklyn Paramount Theater. She addressed the cheering crowd in her hometown neighborhood jargon, "I hope youse all prouda me." Both the audience and the news media gave her rave reviews for her first sound movie.

Bow never completely adapted to the process of making sound pictures, was dissatisfied with her career, and made only nine more films. She married fellow actor (and future lieutenant governor of Nevada) Rex Bell in 1931, moving to their Walking Box Ranch that spanned part of the Mojave Desert across the Nevada and California state lines. The couple split their time between the ranch and Los Angeles, briefly operating the "It Cafe" on the corner of Hollywood and Vine. She received a star on the Hollywood Walk of Fame on February 8, 1960. During most of her husband's 1955–1962 tenure as an office holder in Nevada, Bow was confined to her Culver City, California, residence, where she was in declining health requiring around-the-clock nursing care. Rex Bell died in 1962, Bow dying three years later, in 1965.

== Theatrical releases ==
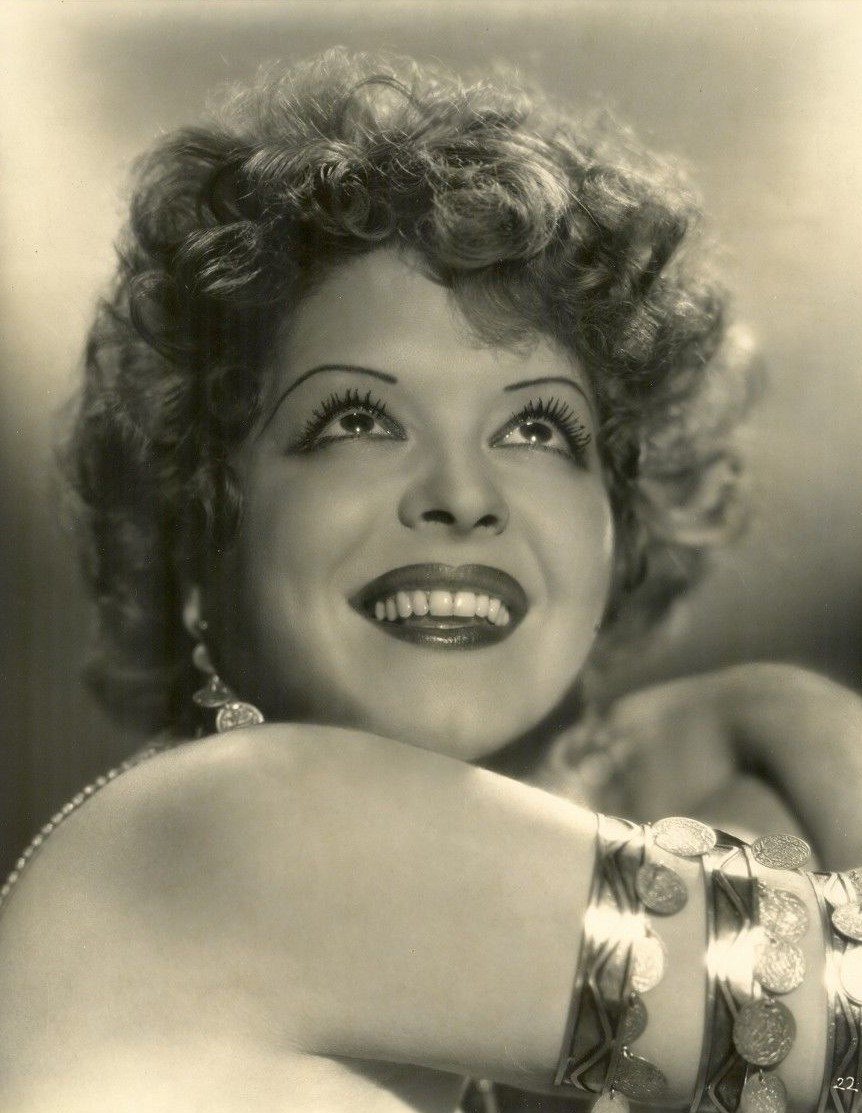
Clara Bow publicity photo, possibly for "Hoopla" (1933).

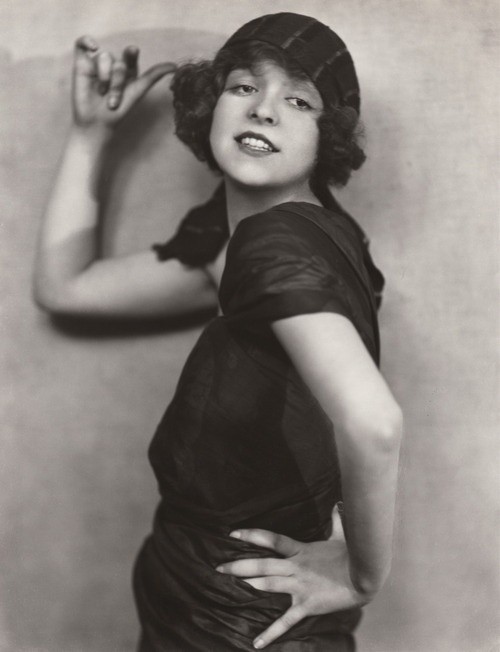
Clara Bow (1921) Brewster Publication's annual nationwide acting contest

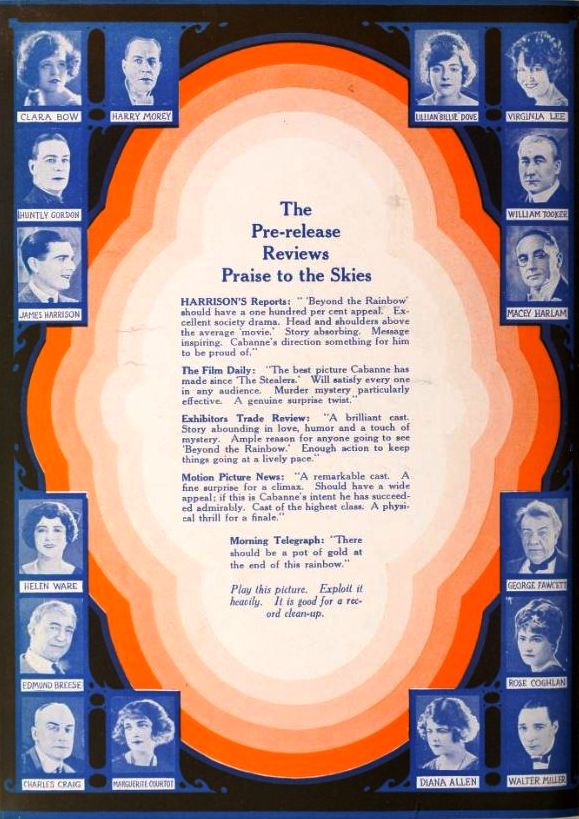
Publicity release for Beyond the Rainbow, Clara Bow (upper left corner) and cast (1922)

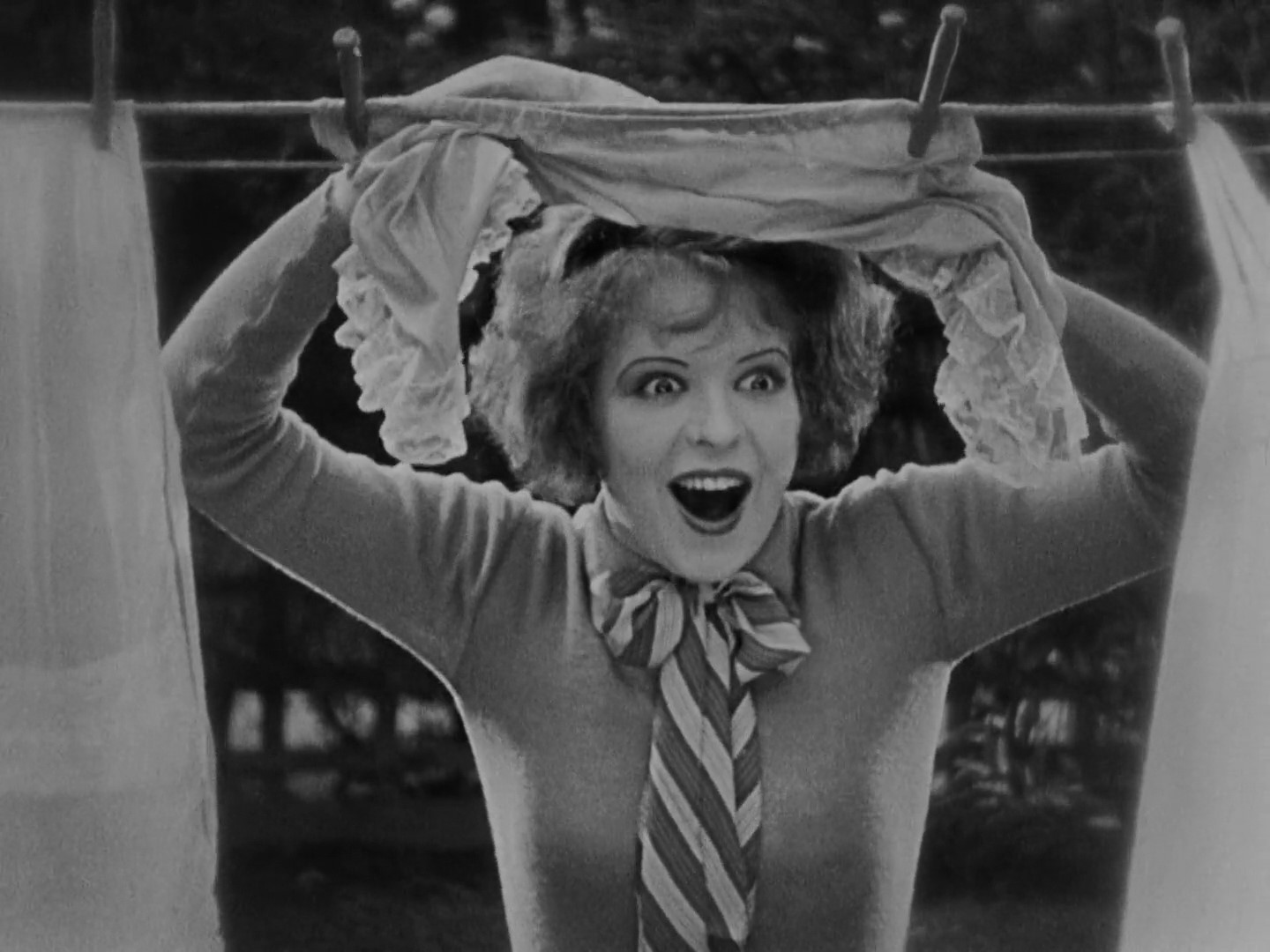
Clara Bow in the Wings trailer (1927)

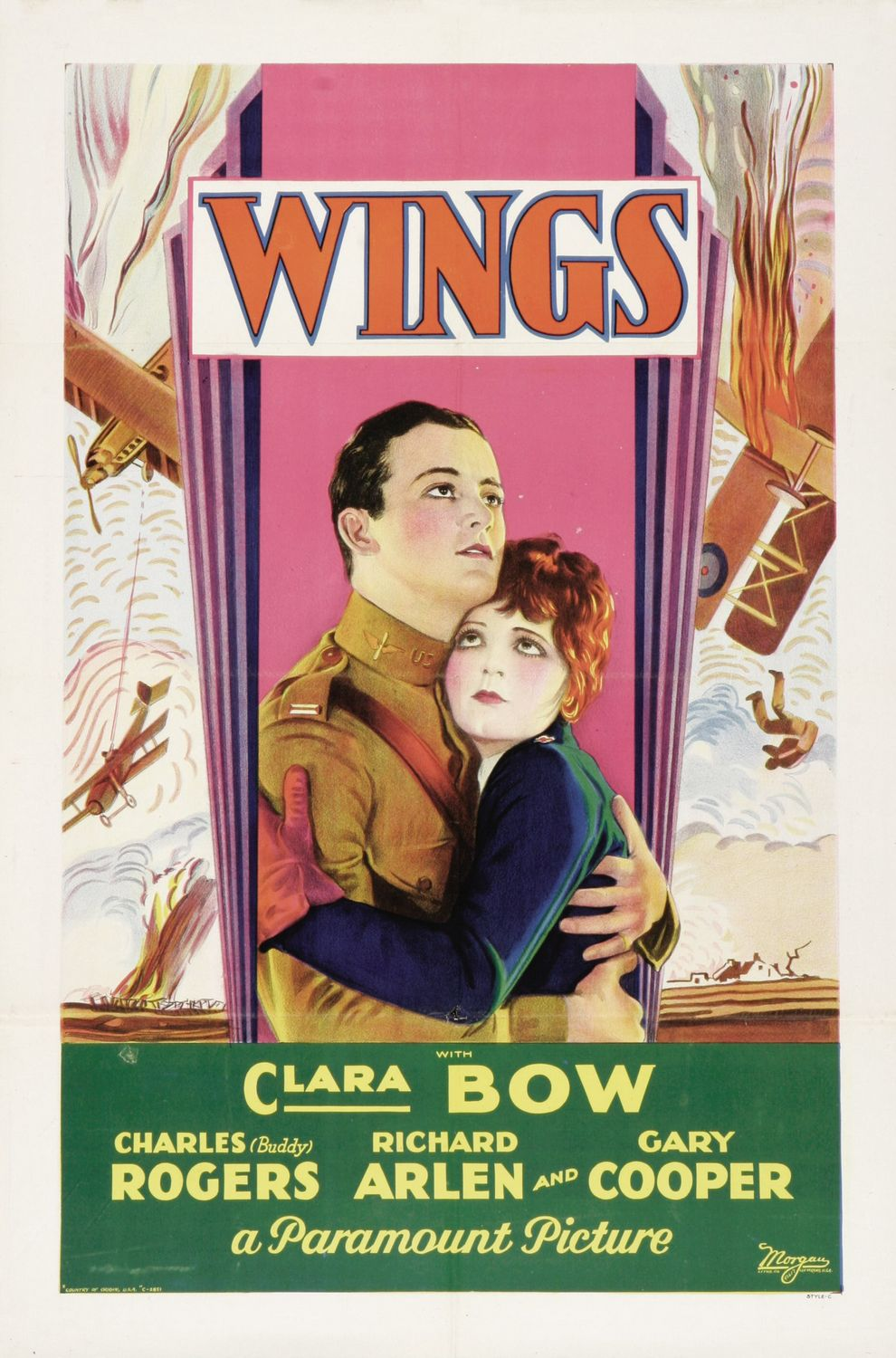
Lobby poster for Wings (1927), Charles "Buddy" Rogers and Clara Bow

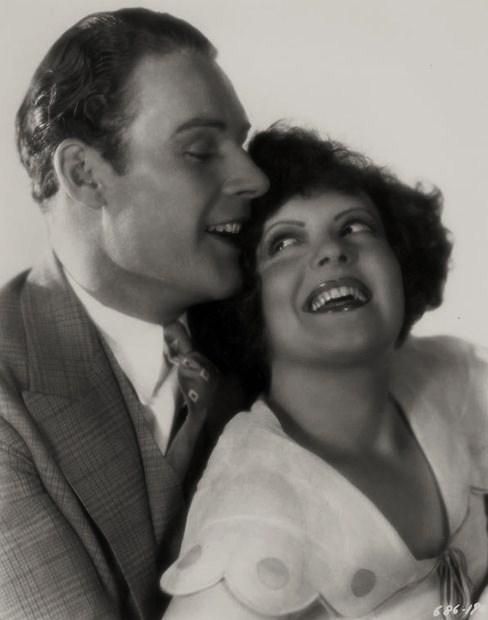
Lane Chandler and Clara Bow in Red Hair (1928)

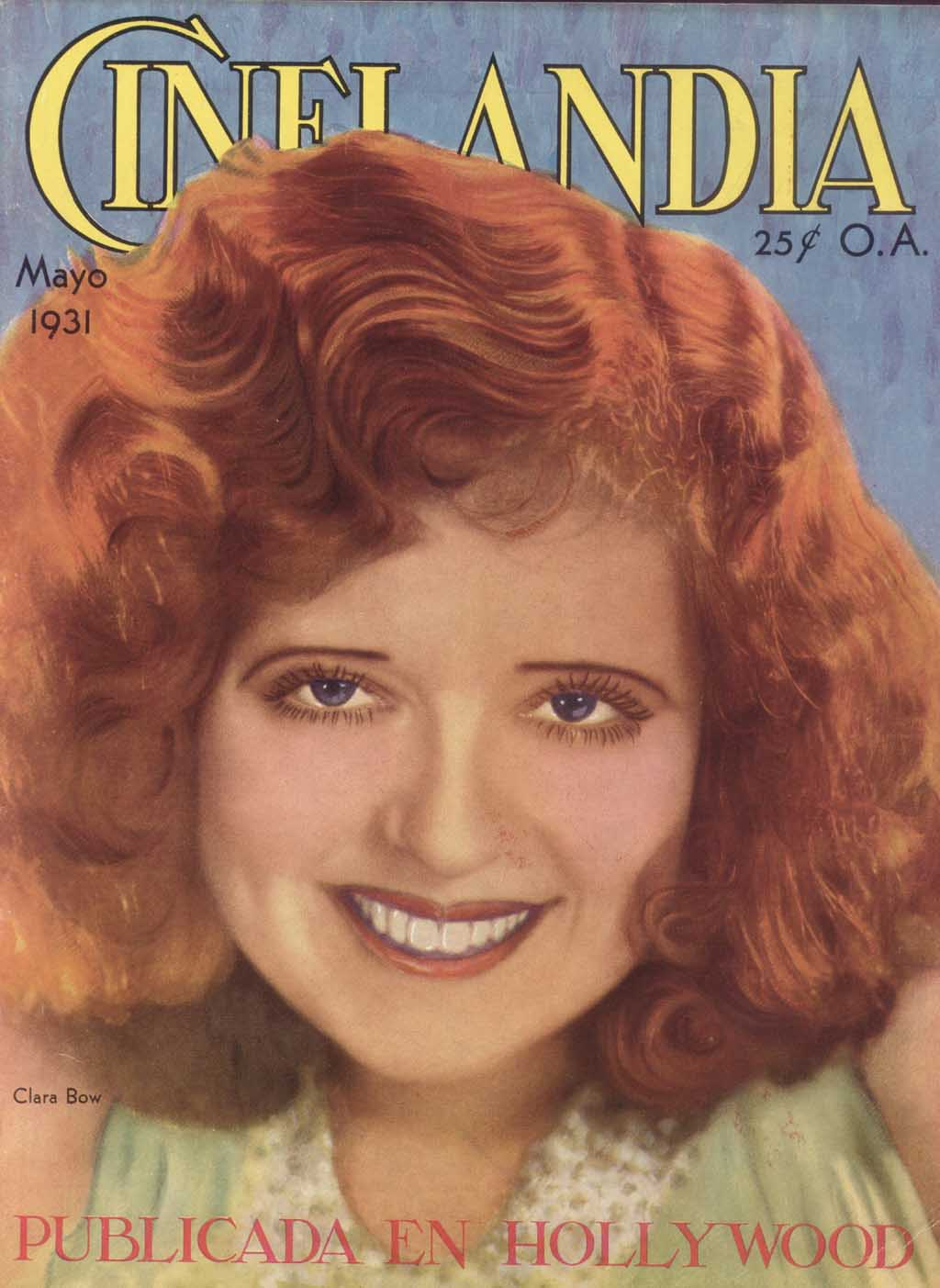
Clara Bow on the cover of CINELANDIA magazine (1931)

Feature-length film (silent except where noted) credits of Clara Bow
Title	Year	Role	Studio	Notes	Ref(s)
Beyond the Rainbow	1922	Virginia Gardener	Robertson-Cole Pictures	Extant	
Down to the Sea in Ships	1922	Dot Morgan	Whaling Film Corp	Extant	
The Pill Pounder	1923		W.W. Hodkinson Corporation	Originally lost, a print was found at an auction by filmmaker Gary Huggins in Omaha, Nebraska in 2023.	
The Daring Years	1923	Mary	Daniel Carson Goodman production	Lost film	
Enemies of Women	1923	Girl dancing on table	Cosmopolitan Productions	Uncredited; An incomplete copy exists at the Library of Congress, missing reels 3 and 9 of 11 total	
Maytime	1923	Alice Tremaine	B. P. Schulberg	An incomplete copy exists missing 3 of the 7 reels total	
Black Oxen	1923	Janet Ogelthorpe	Frank Lloyd Productions	Several incomplete copies exist	
This Woman	1924	Aline Sturdevant	Warner Bros.	Extant	
Grit	1924	Orchid McGonigle	Film Guild Productions	Lost film	
Poisoned Paradise: The Forbidden Story of Monte Carlo	1924	Margot LeBlanc	B. P. Schulberg	An incomplete copy is preserved at UCLA Film and Television Archive	
Daughters of Pleasure	1924	Lila Millas	B.F. Zeidman	An incomplete copy is held at the Library of Congress	
Wine	1924	Angela Warriner	Universal Pictures	Lost film	
Empty Hearts	1924	Rosalie	Banner Pictures Corporation	An incomplete copy is preserved at UCLA Film and Television Archive	
Helen's Babies	1924	Alice Mayton	Principal Pictures	Extant	
Black Lightning	1924	Martha Larned	Gotham Productions	Extant Preserved at UCLA Film and Television Archive	
Capital Punishment	1925	Delia Tate	B.P. Schulberg Productions	Extant	
The Adventurous Sex	1925	The Girl	Howard Estabrook Productions	Lost film	
Eve's Lover	1925	Rena D'Arcy	Warner Bros.	Lost film	
The Lawful Cheater	1925	Molly Burns	B.P. Schulberg Productions	Lost film	
The Scarlet West	1925	Miriam	First National Pictures	Lost film Trailer survives	
My Lady's Lips	1925	Lola Lombard	B.P. Schulberg Productions	Extant Preserved at UCLA Film and Television Archive	
Parisian Love	1925	Marie	B.P. Schulberg	Extant Preserved at UCLA Film and Television Archive	
Kiss Me Again	1925	Grizette	Warner Bros.	Lost film	
The Keeper of the Bees	1925	Lolly Cameron	Gene Stratton Porter Productions	Lost film Trailer exists	
The Primrose Path	1925	Marilyn Merrill	Embassy Pictures	Extant	
Free to Love	1925	Marie Anthony	B.P. Schulberg Productions	Extant	
The Best Bad Man	1925	Peggy Swain	Fox Film Corporation	Extant	
The Ancient Mariner	1925	Doris	Fox Film Corporation	Lost film	
My Lady of Whims	1925	Prudence Severn	Dallas M. Fitzgerald Productions	Extant Preserved at UCLA Film and Television Archive	
The Plastic Age	1925	Cynthia Day	B.P. Schulberg Productions	Extant Preserved at UCLA Film and Television Archive	
Shadow of the Law	1926	Mary Brophy	Embassy Pictures	Lost film	
Two Can Play	1926	Dorothy Hammis	Encore Pictures	Lost film Fragments exist	
Dancing Mothers	1926	Kittens Westcourt	Paramount Famous Players Lasky	Extant	
Fascinating Youth	1926	Herself	Paramount Famous Players Lasky	Trailer exists	
The Runaway	1926	Cynthia Meade	Paramount Famous Players Lasky	Fragment exists	
Mantrap	1926	Alverna	Paramount Famous Players–Lasky	Extant Preserved at UCLA Film and Television Archive	
Kid Boots	1926	Clara McCoy	Paramount Famous Players Lasky	Extant	
It	1927	Betty Lou Spence	Paramount Famous Players–Lasky	Extant	
Children of Divorce	1927	Kitty Flanders	Paramount Famous Players Lasky	Extant	
Rough House Rosie	1927	Rosie O'Reilly	Paramount Famous Players Lasky	Lost film Trailer exists	
Wings	1927	Mary Preston	Paramount Famous Players–Lasky	Extant Won the first Oscar for Outstanding Picture in 1929 released in both silent and sound versions	
Hula	1927	Hula Calhoun	Paramount Famous Players Lasky	Extant	
Get Your Man	1927	Nancy Worthington	Paramount Famous Players Lasky	An Incomplete print exists, missing two of its six reels.	
Red Hair	1928	Bubbles McCoy	Paramount Famous Players Lasky	Fragments exist, including the only known color footage of Bow)	
Ladies of the Mob	1928	Yvonne	Paramount Famous Players Lasky	Lost film	
The Fleet's In	1928	Peaches Deane	Paramount Famous Players Lasky	Lost film	
Three Week-Ends	1928	Gladys O'Brien	Paramount Famous Players Lasky	Fragments exist	
The Wild Party	1929	Stella Ames	Paramount Pictures	Extant Both sound and silent versions Preserved at UCLA Film and Television Archive	
The Saturday Night Kid	1929	Mayme	Paramount Pictures	Extant Alternative title: Love 'Em and Leave 'Em; Both sound and silent versions Preserved at UCLA Film and Television Archive	
Dangerous Curves	1929	Pat Delaney	Paramount Famous Players Lasky	Extant Sound film	
Paramount on Parade	1930	Herself	Paramount Pictures	Extant Sound film English and Spanish versions (Galas de la Paramount); Preserved at UCLA Film and Television Archive	
Love Among the Millionaires	1930	Pepper Whipple	Paramount-Publix Corp	Extant Sound film	
Her Wedding Night	1930	Norma Martin	Paramount-Publix Corp	Extant Sound film Preserved at UCLA Film and Television Archive	
True to the Navy	1930	Ruby Nolan	Paramount-Publix Corp	Extant Sound film	
No Limit	1931	Helen "Bunny" O'Day	Paramount-Publix Corp	Extant Sound film	
Kick In	1931	Molly Hewes	Paramount-Publix Corp	Extant Sound film	
Call Her Savage	1932	Nasa Springer	Fox Film Corporation	Extant Sound film	
Hoop-La	1933	Lou	Fox Film Corporation	Extant Sound film	

== Miscellaneous ==
Various shorts related to Clara Bow
Title	Year	Notes	Ref(s)
Untitled documentary about the 1920s	1927	Footage of multiple celebrities Warner Bros.	
Clara Bow, former It Girl, and husband Rex Bell open the "It Cafe" in Hollywood, California	1937	Hearst vault material Preserved at UCLA Film and Television Archive	
Screen Snapshots Series 20, No. 1	1940	Columbia Pictures 20th anniversary show	
Screen Snapshots 1860: Howdy, Podner	1949	Short subject – Clara Bow, Rex Bell and other celebrities in Las Vegas	
Screen Snapshots Series 35, No. 4	1958	"Ramblin' round Hollywood"; Columbia Pictures 20th anniversary show. Footage shot by Ken Murray, produced by Ralph Staub.	

== Bibliography ==
- Sarvady, Andrea Cornell (2006). Miller, Frank (ed.). Leading Ladies: The 50 Most Unforgettable Actresses of the Studio Era. TCM film guide. San Francisco, California: Chronicle Books. ISBN 978-0-8118-5248-7. OCLC 64744501.
- Stenn, David (1988). Clara Bow: Runnin' Wild (1st ed.). New York: Doubleday. ISBN 978-0-385-24125-0.
