= Lois Hutchinson =

- Occupations: Screenwriter, journalist
- Years active: 1923–1926

Lois Hutchinson was an American screenwriter and journalist employed by film producer B.P. Schulberg in the 1920s.

== Biography ==
Hutchinson started out as a journalist in Washington before moving to Hollywood and working in the publicity department for Samuel Goldwyn around 1923. She worked as a secretary for B.P. Schulberg and then became a script girl for director John M. Stahl at First National. Within three years, she had worked her way up the ranks into the scenario department. Her first full script was the 1925 film Parisian Love.

== Selected filmography ==
- Out of the Storm (1926)
- The Girl Who Wouldn't Work (1925)
- Parisian Love (1925)
- White Man (1924) (titles)
