= Alyce Mills =

American silent film actress

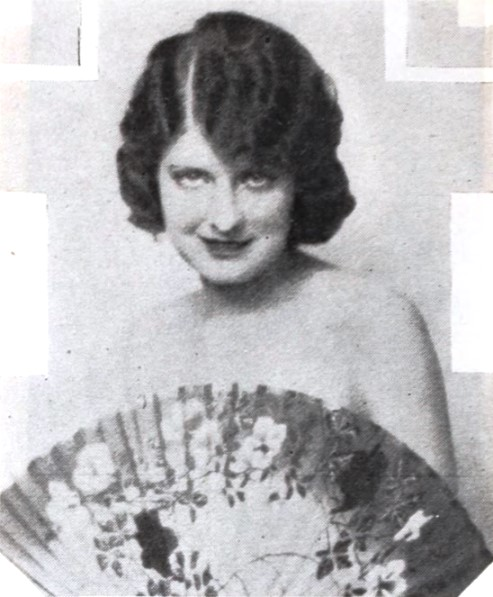
- Mills in 1925
- Born: February 16, 1899; Pittsburgh, Pennsylvania, United States
- Died: April 27, 1990 (aged 91); Fort Lauderdale, Florida, United States
- Occupation: Actress
- Years active: 1923 - 1927 (film)

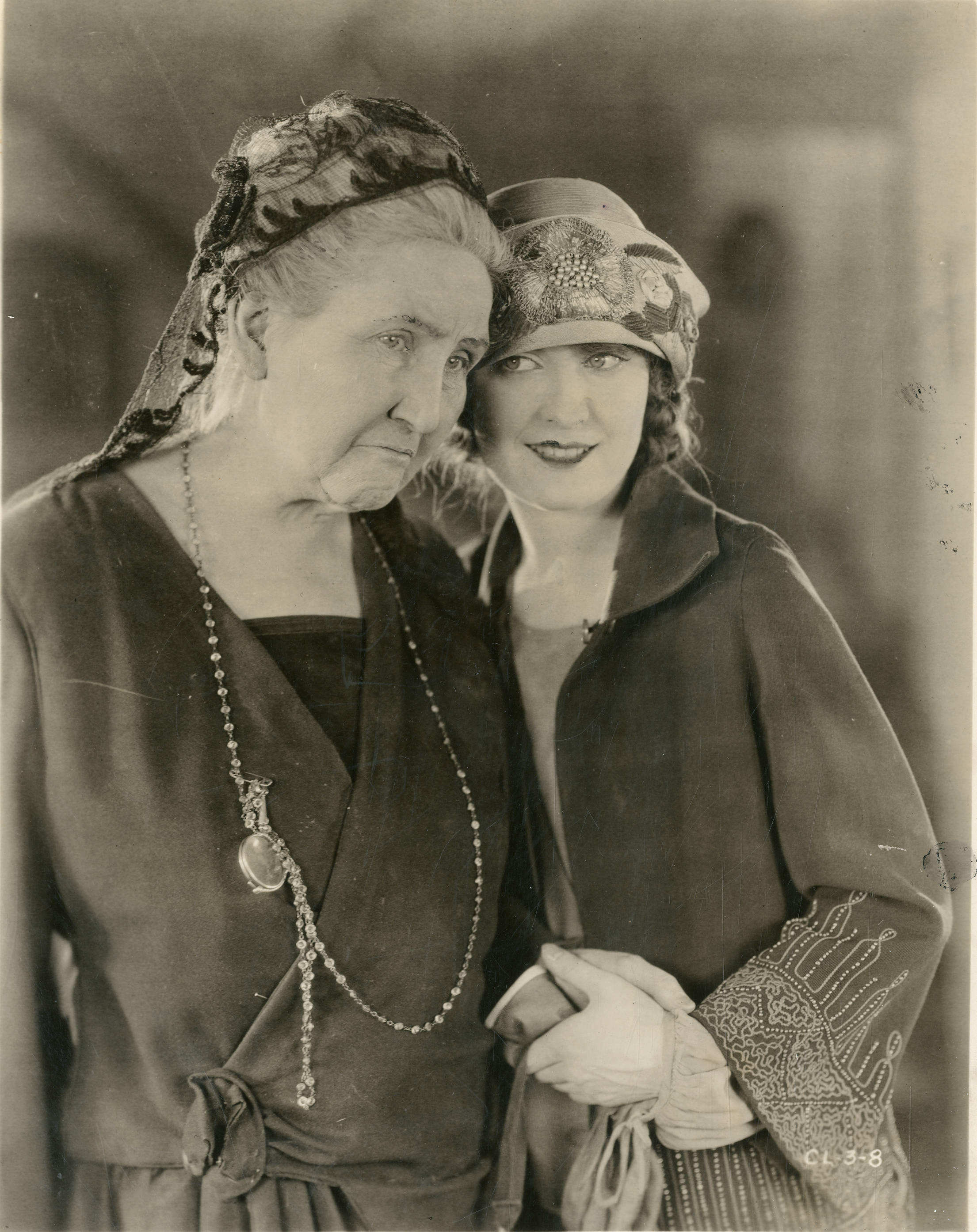
Alice Chapin and Alyce Mills in the film Daughters of the Night (1924)

Alyce Mills (16 February 1899 – 27 April 1990) was an American actress. She appeared in silent films including as a lead. She starred in the 1924 film Daughters of the Night and the 1926 film Say It Again. She also starred in two B. P. Schulberg films with William Powell: My Lady's Lips and Faint Perfume.

== Biography ==
Mills was from Pittsburgh, Pennsylvania, where she attended Allegheny High School and won a beauty contest before beginning a career in film. She arrived in Los Angeles in 1925, having signed a long-term contract with Schulberg to appear in his films.

In a review of With This Ring, the Lansing State Journal wrote that Mills was "rapidly becoming established as one of the leading actresses of the younger players."

Mills married businessman William Davey in 1928. He bought her a house and they honeymooned in Honolulu, Hawaii. Mills retired from acting at the time of her marriage. The couple divorced in 1937, and Davey went on to marry actress Gloria Swanson in 1945.

== Filmography ==
Year	Title	Role	Notes
1924	Daughters of the Night	Betty Blair	Lost film
1925	Faint Perfume	Ledda Perrin	Lost film
1925	The Keeper of the Bees	Molly Cameron	Lost film
1925	Morals for Men	Marion Winslow	
1925	My Lady's Lips	Dora Blake	
1925	Parisian Love	Jean D'Arcy	
1925	With This Ring		Lost film
1925	School for Wives	Mary Wilson	Lost film
1925	Too Many Kisses	Flapper	
1926	The Prince of Broadway	Nancy Lee	
1926	Say It Again	Princess Elena	Lost film
1926	The Romance of a Million Dollars	Marie Moore	
1927	The Whirlwind of Youth	Cornelia Evans	
1927	Two Girls Wanted	Edna Delafield	Lost film
