= Rich Men's Wives =

1922 film

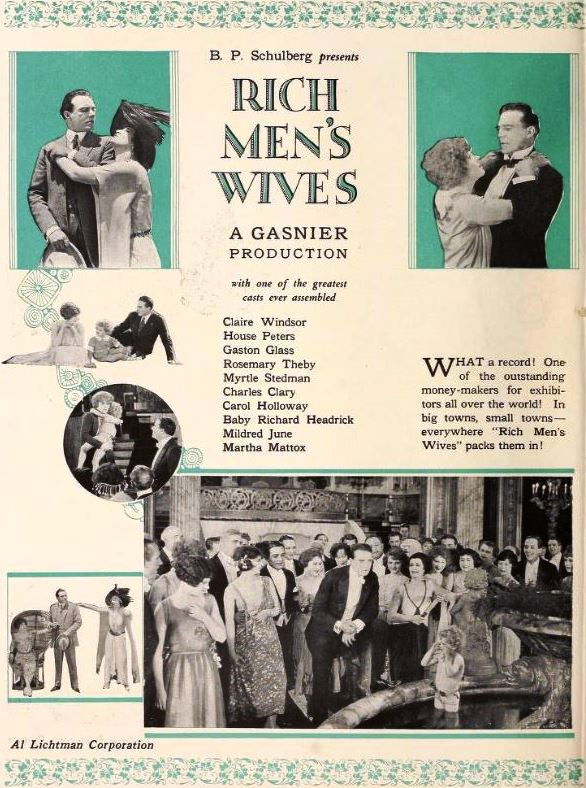
- Directed by: Louis J. Gasnier
- Written by: Agnes Christine Johnston (story); Frank Mitchell Dazey (story); Lois Zellner
- Produced by: B.P. Schulberg; Louis J. Gasnier
- Starring: House Peters; Claire Windsor; Gaston Glass
- Cinematography: Karl Struss
- Production company: B.P. Schulberg Productions
- Distributed by: Preferred Pictures
- Release date: September 15, 1922
- Running time: 70 minutes
- Country: United States
- Languages: Silent; English intertitles

Rich Men's Wives is a lost 1922 American silent drama film directed by Louis J. Gasnier and starring House Peters, Claire Windsor and Gaston Glass.

== Plot ==
A bored wife of a wealthy man is irritated by his neglect, and is drawn into a flirtation with another man. When her husband discovers this he banishes this from the family home, and forbids her from seeing their son.

== Cast ==
- House Peters as John Masters
- Claire Windsor as Gay Davenport
- Richard Headrick as Jackie
- Gaston Glass as Juan Camillo
- Charles Clary as Mr. Davenport
- Myrtle Stedman as Mrs. Davenport
- Mildred June as Estelle Davenport
- Rosemary Theby as Mrs. Lindley-Blair
- Carol Holloway as Maid
- Martha Mattox as Nurse
- William Austin as Reggie

== Bibliography ==
- Connelly, Robert B. The Silents: Silent Feature Films, 1910-36, Volume 40, Issue 2. December Press, 1998.
- Munden, Kenneth White. The American Film Institute Catalog of Motion Pictures Produced in the United States, Part 1. University of California Press, 1997.
