= The Triflers =

The Triflers may refer to:

- The Triflers, 1920 silent American film directed by Christy Cabanne
- The Triflers, 1924 silent American film directed by Louis Gasnier
