= The Girl Who Wouldn't Work =

1925 film

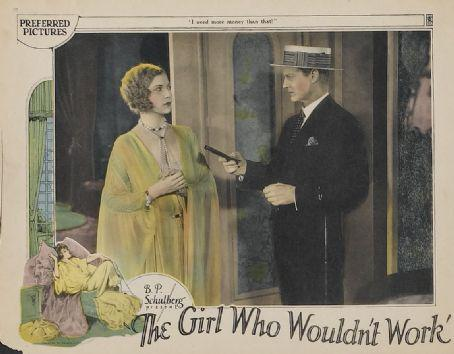
- Poster
- Directed by: Marcel De Sano
- Written by: Lois Hutchinson (scenario)
- Based on: The Girl Who Wouldn't Work by Gertie de S. Wentworth-James
- Produced by: B. P. Schulberg
- Starring: Lionel Barrymore; Marguerite De La Motte; Henry B. Walthall
- Cinematography: Allen Siegler
- Distributed by: Preferred Pictures
- Release date: August 18, 1925
- Running time: 6 reels; 5,979 feet
- Country: United States
- Language: Silent (English intertitles)

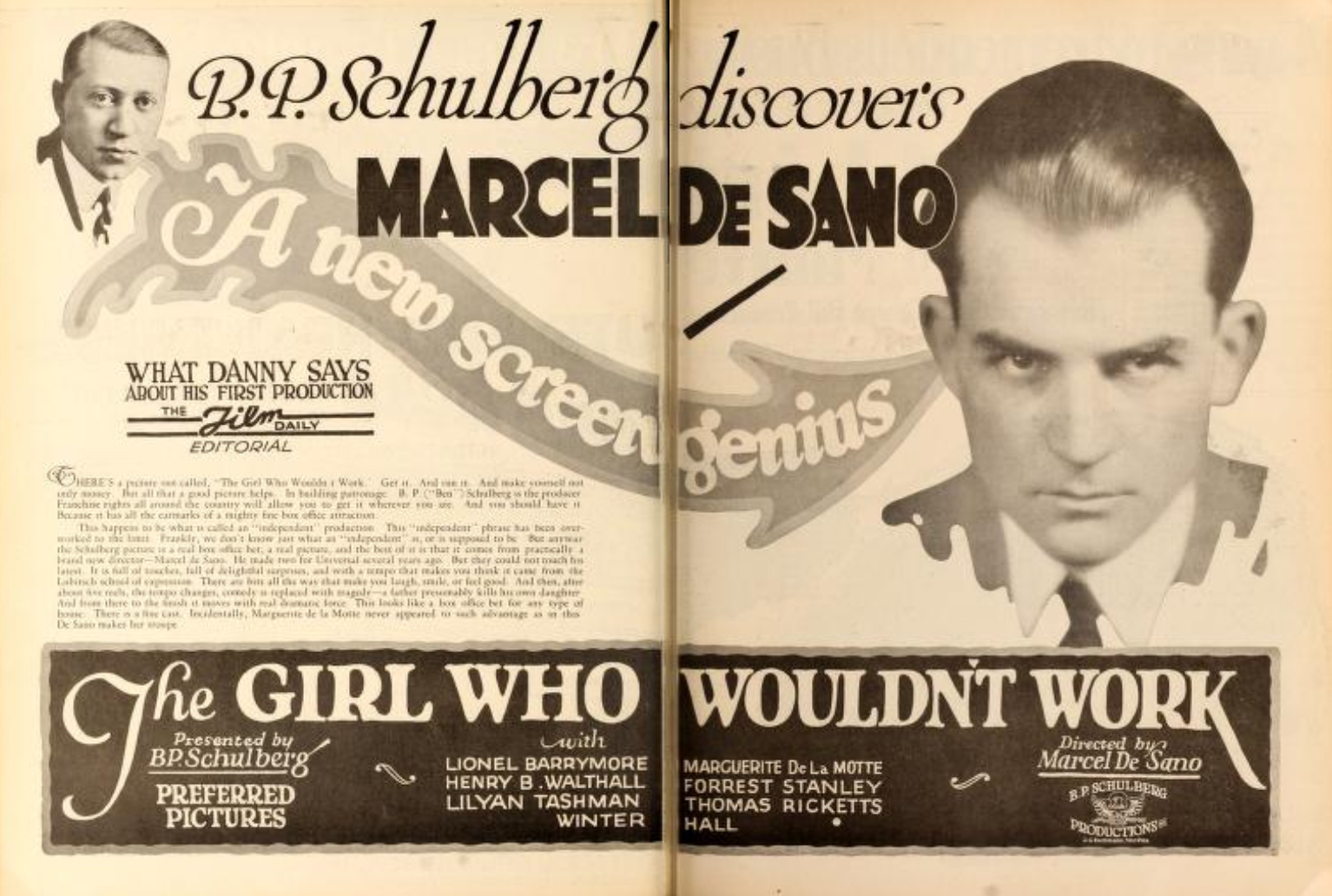
Advertisement in Motion Picture News (1925)

The Girl Who Wouldn't Work is an extant 1925 American silent drama film produced by B. P. Schulberg and starring Lionel Barrymore and Marguerite De La Motte. Preferred Pictures and Al Lichtman handled the distribution of this film directed by Marcel De Sano.

== Plot ==
As described in a film magazine reviews, Mary Hale, employed in a department store, arouses the displeasure of her boss because she shirks her work. Gordon Kent, a rounder, is turned down by another clerk, and flirts with Mary and she loses her job. To spite her fiancé, William Norworth, the assistant manager, she drives away in Kent’s automobile. They land at her home early in the morning just as her father, a night watchman, is returning home. He scolds and slaps her and, when she meets Kent the next day, she tells him that she has left home. He persuades her to come to his home for the night and he goes to the club. Greta, a chorus girl who is his mistress, comes to the house and kicks Mary out. Mary’s father also appears on the scene, mistakes Greta, who has hidden in bed, for Mary and shoots her dead. The next morning Kent discovers the tragedy, blames himself for it, and confesses the crime to save Mary’s reputation. Her father, however, finally confesses.

== Cast ==
- Lionel Barrymore as Gordon Kent
- Marguerite De La Motte as Mary Hale
- Henry B. Walthall as William Hale
- Lilyan Tashman as Greta Verlaine
- Forrest Stanley as William Norworth
- Winter Hall as District Attorney
- Tom Ricketts as The Rounder

== Preservation ==
A print of The Girl Who Wouldn't Work is preserved at the Library of Congress.

== See also ==
- Honor killing
- Lionel Barrymore filmography
