= Faint Perfume =

1925 film

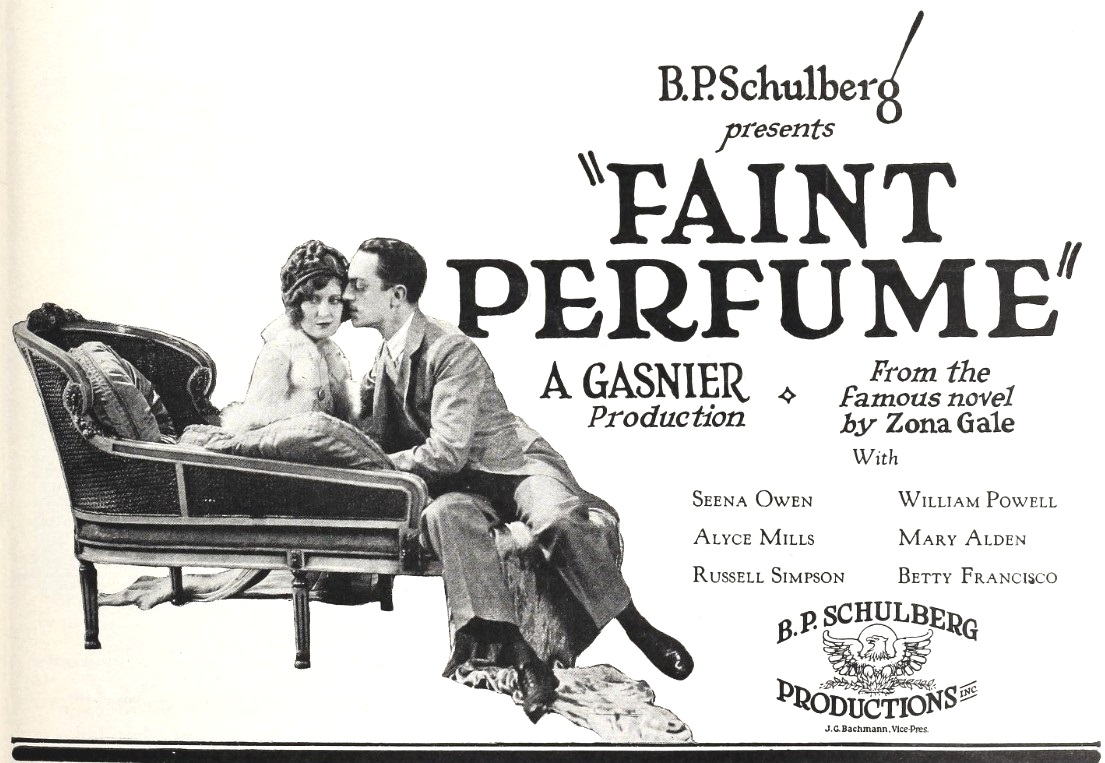
- Advertisement
- Directed by: Louis J. Gasnier
- Written by: John F. Goodrich
- Based on: Faint Perfume by Zona Gale
- Produced by: B.P. Schulberg
- Starring: Seena Owen; William Powell; Alyce Mills
- Cinematography: Allen G. Siegler
- Production company: B.P. Schulberg Productions
- Distributed by: Preferred Pictures
- Release date: June 27, 1925
- Running time: 60 minutes
- Country: United States
- Language: Silent (English intertitles)

Faint Perfume is a 1925 American silent drama film directed by Louis J. Gasnier and starring Seena Owen, William Powell, and Mary Alden.

== Plot ==
As described in a film magazine review, Ledda Perrin is in love with Barnaby Powers, the husband of her cousin Richmiel Crumb. Their child Oliver is put in the custody of Richiel by the divorce decree. However, Richmiel is unhappy with the bother of the child's care. Barnaby stops to visit Richmiel when he returns from Europe to plead for custody of the boy. While in Richmiel's room the whole family of Richmiel enters the place. Richmiel vows to spite them both by keeping possession of the child. However, when Barnaby goes to Richmiel's rooms, he finds her with her lover. She is glad to be rid of the child and Barnaby is glad to get the boy.

== Cast ==
- Seena Owen as Richmiel Crumb
- William Powell as Barnaby Powers
- Alyce Mills as Ledda Perrin
- Mary Alden as Ma Crumb
- Russell Simpson as Grandpa Crumb
- Betty Francisco as Pearl Crumb
- Jackie Saunders as Tweet Crumb
- Philo McCullough as Richmiel's lover
- Ned Sparks as Orrin Crumb
- Dick Brandon as Oliver Powers
- Joan Standing as The Hired Girl

== Bibliography ==
- Goble, Alan. The Complete Index to Literary Sources in Film. Walter de Gruyter, 1999.
