= Keeper of the Bees =

Keeper of the Bees may refer to:

- The Keeper of the Bees (novel), a novel by Gene Stratton-Porter, the basis of several films
- The Keeper of the Bees (1925 film), an American film directed by James Leo Meehan
- The Keeper of the Bees (1935 film), an American film directed by Christy Cabanne
- Keeper of the Bees (1947 film), an American film directed by John Sturges
