= The Whirlwind of Youth =

1927 film

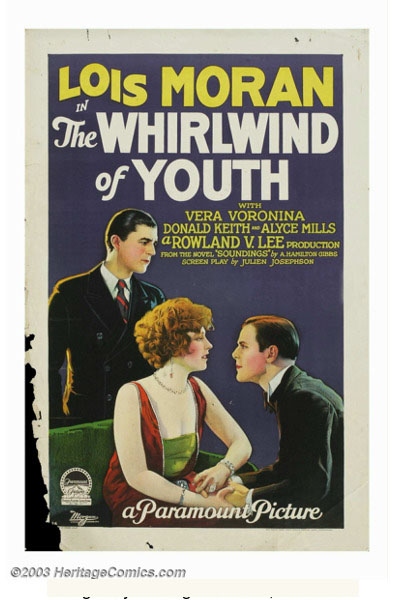
- Film poster
- Directed by: Rowland V. Lee
- Written by: Julien Josephson
- Produced by: B.P. Schulberg
- Starring: Lois Moran; Vera Voronina; Donald Keith; Alyce Mills
- Cinematography: G.O. Post
- Production company: Paramount Pictures
- Distributed by: Paramount Pictures
- Release date: April 30, 1927
- Running time: 60 minutes; 5,866 feet (1,788 m)
- Country: United States
- Language: Silent (English intertitles)

The Whirlwind of Youth is a 1927 American silent romance film directed by Rowland V. Lee and starring Lois Moran, Vera Voronina, Donald Keith, and Alyce Mills.

== Cast ==
- Lois Moran as Nancy Hawthorne
- Vera Voronina as Heloise
- Donald Keith as Bob Whittaker
- Alyce Mills as Cornelia Evans
- Larry Kent as Lloyd Evans
- Gareth Hughes as Curley
- Charles Lane as Jim Hawthorne

== Preservation ==
With no prints of The Whirlwind of Youth located in any film archives, it is a lost film.

== Bibliography ==
- Gillian B. Anderson. Music for silent films, 1894-1929: a guide. Library of Congress, 1988.
