= Daughters of the Night =

1924 film

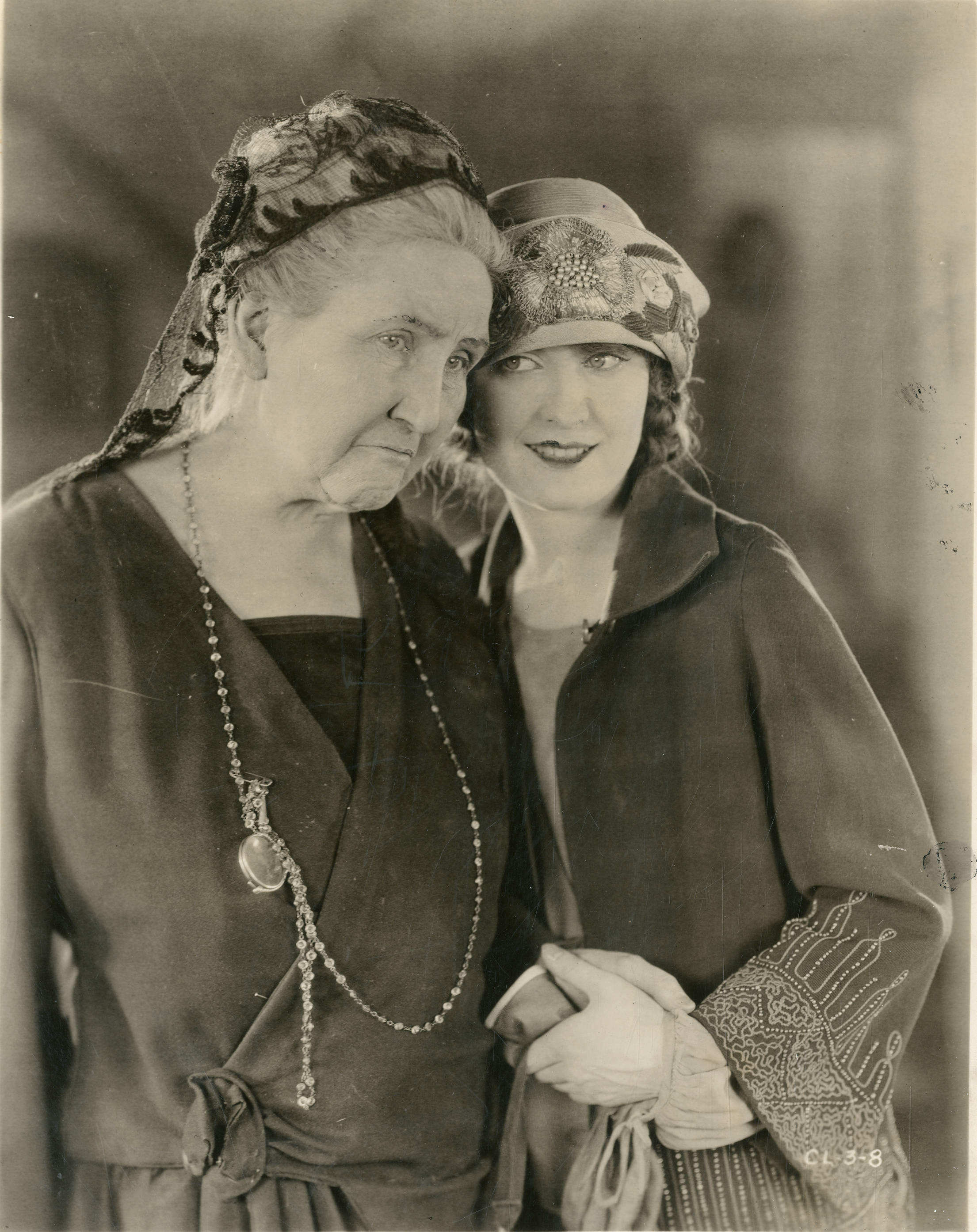
- Still with Alice Chapin and Alyce Mills
- Directed by: Elmer Clifton
- Written by: Willard Robertson (story & screenplay)
- Produced by: William Fox
- Starring: Orville Caldwell; Alyce Mills
- Distributed by: Fox Film Corporation
- Release date: November 9, 1924
- Running time: 6 reels
- Country: United States
- Language: Silent (English intertitles)

Daughters of the Night is a 1924 American silent melodrama film produced and distributed by the Fox Film Corporation. It was directed by Elmer Clifton with Alyce Mills as the lead actress.

== Plot ==
As described in a review in a film magazine, Betty Blair (Mills) finishes a training course at the school for telephone operators in New York and returns to her home town Midvale where her scheming aunt (Chapin) makes her promise to marry a scheming wealthy lawyer, Kilmaster (Richmond). Brothers Jimmy (Sands) and Billy Roberts (Caldwell) cap the climax to a wild career by getting arrested in a street brawl and are turned out by their irate father. Jimmy joins his crook pals while Billy determines to make good. He wanders into Midvale and gets a job as lineman with the telephone company where he meets Betty and falls in love with her. Jimmy's gang pick out the Midvale bank for a haul. In making a getaway, Jimmy rushes into the telephone building. A fire starts and he is trapped but manages to send a last message to his mother over the phone. The thieves have cut the wires, but Betty stays on the job until Billy repairs the lines and sends an alarm, which brings about the capture of the gang. Billy rushes back and rescues her from the flames and, having made good, returns home with his bride-to-be and gets his parents' forgiveness.

== Cast ==
- Orville Caldwell as Billy Roberts
- Alyce Mills as Betty Blair
- Phelps Decker as Doc Long
- Alice Chapin as Grandma Backer
- Warner Richmond as Lawyer Kilmaster
- Bobbie Perkins as Eloise Dabb
- Clarice Vance as Mrs. Dabb
- Claude Cooper as Mr. Dabb
- Willard Robertson as Professor Woodbury
- Charles Slattery as Dick Oliver
- Henry Sands as Jimmy Roberts

== Preservation ==
With no prints of Daughters of the Night located in any film archives, it is a lost film.
