= The Prince of Broadway =

1926 film

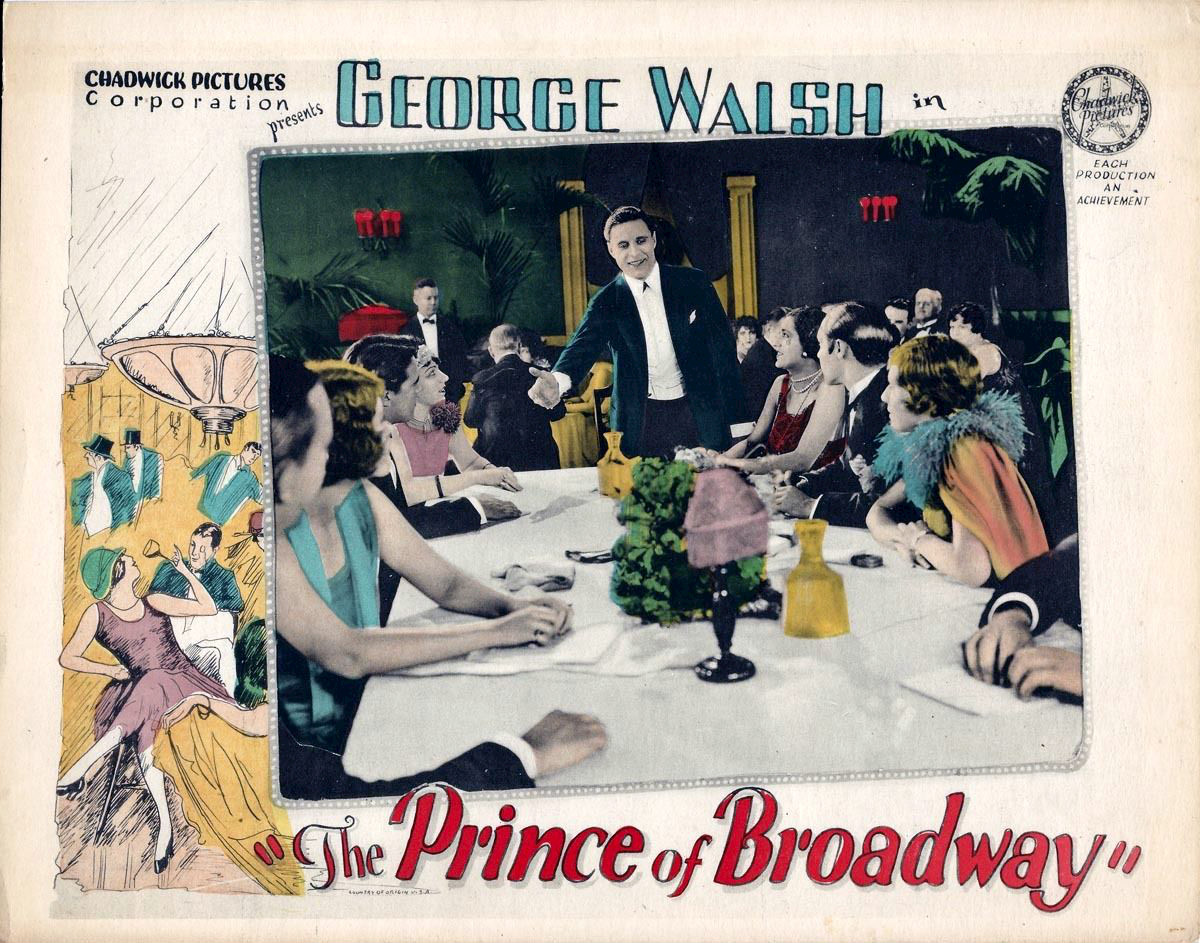
- Lobby card
- Directed by: John Gorman
- Written by: Frederick Chapin
- Based on: The Prince of Broadway by John Gorman
- Produced by: Hampton Del Ruth
- Starring: George Walsh; Alyce Mills; Freeman Wood
- Production company: Chadwick Pictures
- Release date: January 1, 1926
- Running time: 6 reels
- Country: United States
- Language: Silent (English intertitles)

The Prince of Broadway is a 1926 American silent drama film directed by John Gorman and starring George Walsh, Alyce Mills, and Freeman Wood.

== Plot ==
As described in a film magazine review, middleweight boxing champion George Burke leads a convivial life and his careless living results in him being knocked out in a match. Actress Nancy Lee, who was his boyhood sweetheart, persuades her wealthy lover Wade Turner to let George use his California ranch to rehabilitate and train. Turner does so but notifies his foreman to hinder George from getting into fighting shape. George, however, rounds back into shape under the care of and training by James J. Jeffries. Wade and Nancy arrive, the former having told her that George is not making good with his time at the ranch. However, George is able to best the champion and wins the love of Nancy.

== Cast ==
- George Walsh as George Burke
- Alyce Mills as Nancy Lee
- Freeman Wood as Wade Turner
- James J. Jeffries as himself
- Robert Roper as The Champion
- Tommy Ryan as Jack Root, Matchmaker
- Charles McHugh as Tim McCane
- Spencer Bell as Snowball
- Frankie Genaro as Fighter
- Ad Wolgast as Fighter
- Billy Papke as Fighter
- Leach Cross as Fighter
- Gene Delmont as Fighter

== Bibliography ==
- Munden, Kenneth White. The American Film Institute Catalog of Motion Pictures Produced in the United States, Part 1. University of California Press, 1997.
