= The Woman's Side =

1922 film

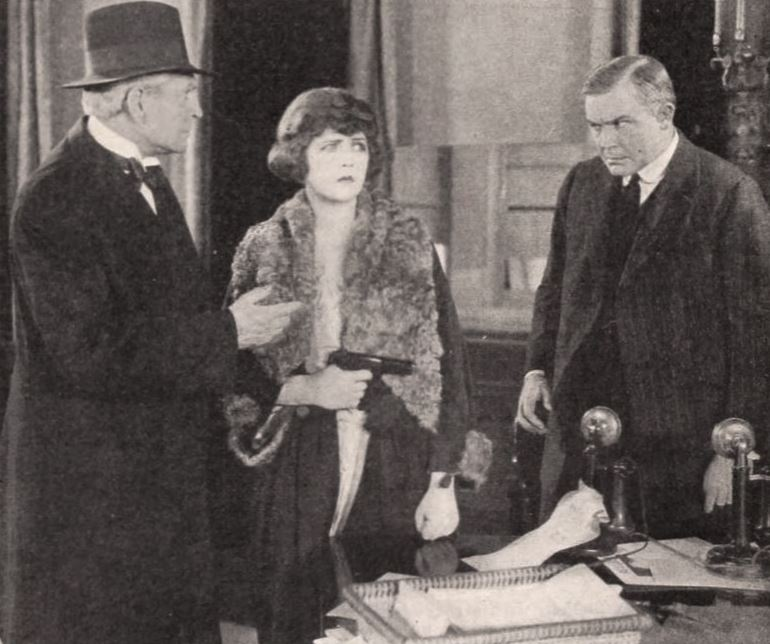
- Directed by: J.A. Barry
- Written by: J.A. Barry; Elliott J. Clawson
- Produced by: B.P. Schulberg
- Starring: Katherine MacDonald; Edmund Burns; Henry A. Barrows
- Cinematography: Joseph Brotherton
- Production company: Preferred Pictures
- Distributed by: Associated First National Pictures
- Release date: March 1922
- Running time: 60 minutes
- Country: United States
- Languages: Silent; English intertitles

The Woman's Side is a 1922 American silent drama film directed by J.A. Barry and starring Katherine MacDonald, Edmund Burns and Henry A. Barrows.

== Cast ==
- Katherine MacDonald as Mary Gray
- Edmund Burns as Theodore Van Ness Jr.
- Henry A. Barrows as Thedore VanNess Sr.
- T.D. Crittenden as Judge Gray
- Ora Devereaux as The ex-Mrs. Judge Gray
- Wade Boteler as 'Big Bob' Masters

== Preservation ==
The film is currently lost.

== Bibliography ==
- Connelly, Robert B. The Silents: Silent Feature Films, 1910-36, Volume 40, Issue 2. December Press, 1998.
- Munden, Kenneth White. The American Film Institute Catalog of Motion Pictures Produced in the United States, Part 1. University of California Press, 1997.
