= The Romance of a Million Dollars =

1926 film

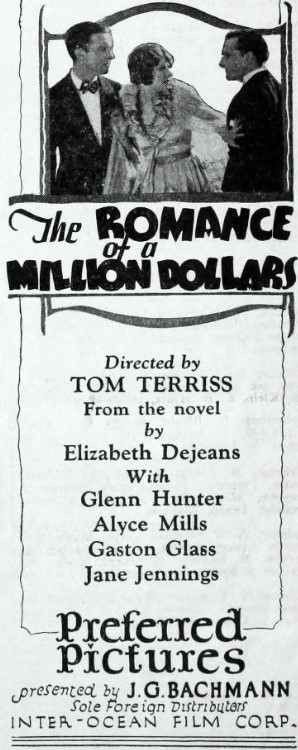
- Advertisement
- Directed by: Tom Terriss
- Written by: Arthur Hoerl
- Based on: Novel by Elizabeth Dejeans
- Produced by: J. G. Bachmann
- Starring: Glenn Hunter; Alyce Mills; Gaston Glass
- Cinematography: Stuart Kelson; William Miller
- Production company: J.G. Bachmann Productions
- Distributed by: Preferred Pictures
- Release date: July 15, 1926
- Running time: 6 reels
- Country: United States
- Language: Silent (English intertitles)

The Romance of a Million Dollars is a 1926 American silent drama film directed by Tom Terriss and starring Glenn Hunter, Alyce Mills, and Gaston Glass.

== Cast ==
- Glenn Hunter as Breck Dunbarton
- Alyce Mills as Marie Moore
- Gaston Glass as West MacDonald
- Jane Jennings as Mrs. Dunbarton
- Bobby Watson as The Detective
- Lea Penman as Mrs. Olwin
- Thomas Brooks as Ezra Dunbarton

== Preservation ==
A print of The Romance of a Million Dollars is held by the Library of Congress.

== Bibliography ==
- Langman, Larry. American Film Cycles: The Silent Era. Greenwood Publishing, 1998.
