= Say It Again (film) =

1926 film by Gregory La Cava

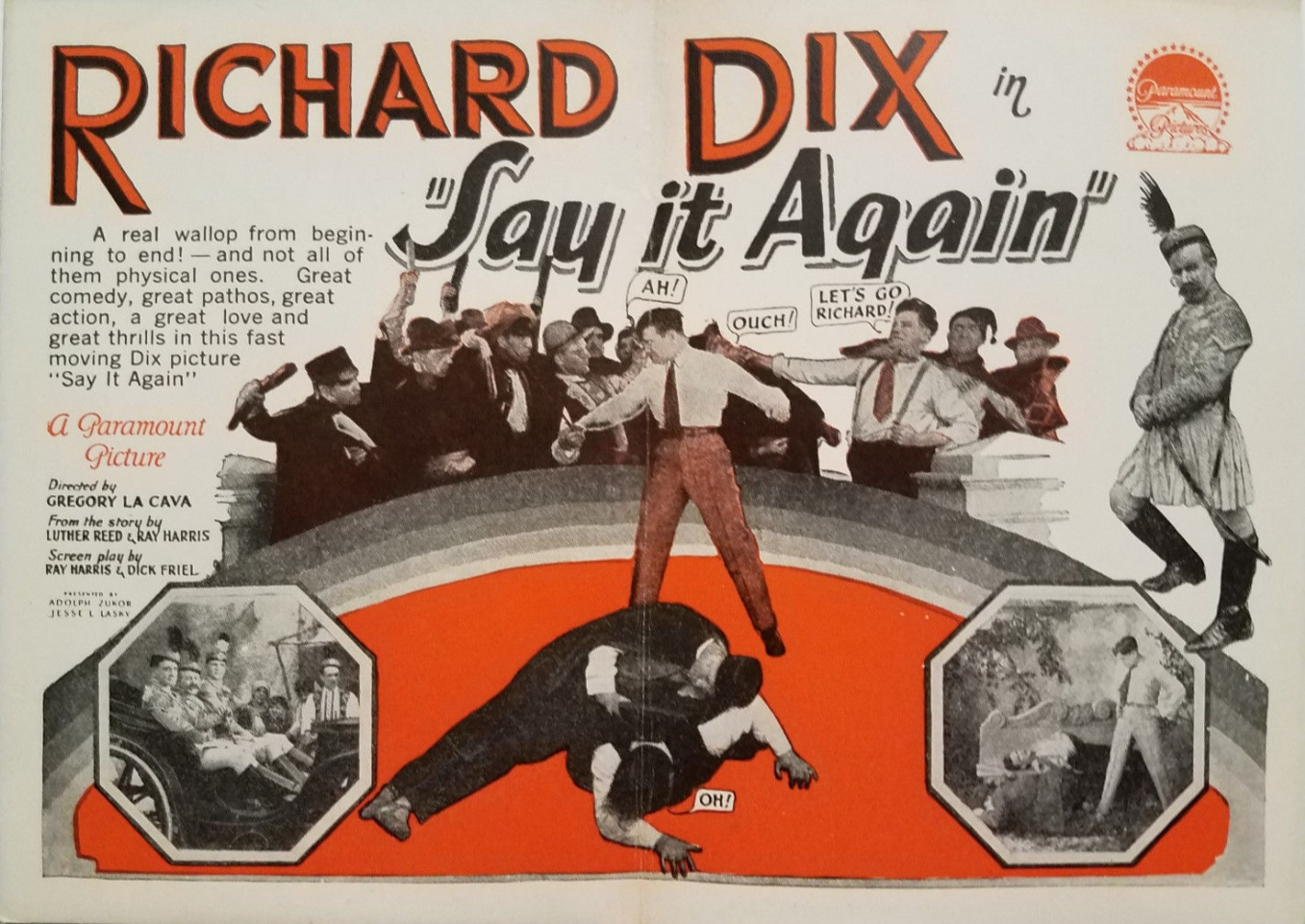
- Lobby card
- Directed by: Gregory La Cava
- Written by: Ray Harris (story & screenplay); Luther Reed (story); Richard M. Friel
- Produced by: Adolph Zukor; Jesse Lasky
- Starring: Richard Dix; Alyce Mills
- Cinematography: Edward Cronjager
- Distributed by: Paramount Pictures
- Release date: May 31, 1926
- Running time: 80 minutes; 8 reels
- Country: United States
- Language: Silent (English intertitles)

Say It Again is a 1926 American silent romantic comedy film produced by Famous Players–Lasky and released through Paramount Pictures. It starred Richard Dix and was directed by Gregory La Cava.

== Plot ==
As described in a film magazine, during the World War, the queen of Spenozia turns her chateau into a hospital. Princess Elena, who is nursing there, falls in love with Bob Howard, one of the patients whose face she cannot see because of his bandages. When the Armistice comes, Bob returns to America, but after a year or two starts back to Europe to find the nurse. He is mistaken for the crown prince, and, not speaking Spenozian, does not understand what has happened. The people discover Bob is an imposter and a revolution occurs despite the man's attempts to admit he is not the prince. He saves the Princess Elena, and she, realizing he is the soldier she loved in the hospital, flees with him back to America.

== Cast ==
- Richard Dix as Bob Howard
- Alyce Mills as Princess Elena
- Chester Conklin as Prince Otto V
- Gunboat Smith as Gunner Jones
- Bernard Randall as Baron Ertig
- Paul Porcasi as Count Tanza
- Ida Waterman as Marguerite
- William Ricciardi as Prime Minister Stemmler

== Preservation ==
With no prints of Say It Again located in any film archives, it is a lost film.
