= Heroes and Husbands =

1922 film by Chester Withey

- Directed by: Chester Withey
- Written by: Charles A. Logue
- Produced by: B.P. Schulberg
- Starring: Katherine MacDonald; Nigel Barrie; Charles K. Gerrard
- Cinematography: Joseph Brotherton
- Production company: Preferred Pictures
- Distributed by: First National Pictures
- Release date: August 21, 1922
- Running time: 60 minutes
- Country: United States
- Languages: Silent; English intertitles

Heroes and Husbands is a 1922 American silent drama film directed by Chester Withey and starring Katherine MacDonald, Nigel Barrie and Charles K. Gerrard.

== Cast ==
- Katherine MacDonald as Susanne Danbury
- Nigel Barrie as Walter Gaylord
- Charles Clary as Hugh Bemis
- Charles K. Gerrard as Martin Tancray
- Mona Kingsley as Agatha Bemis
- Ethel Kaye as Annette

== Preservation ==
The film is lost.

== Bibliography ==
- Munden, Kenneth White. The American Film Institute Catalog of Motion Pictures Produced in the United States, Part 1. University of California Press, 1997.
