= Preferred Pictures =

American silent film production company

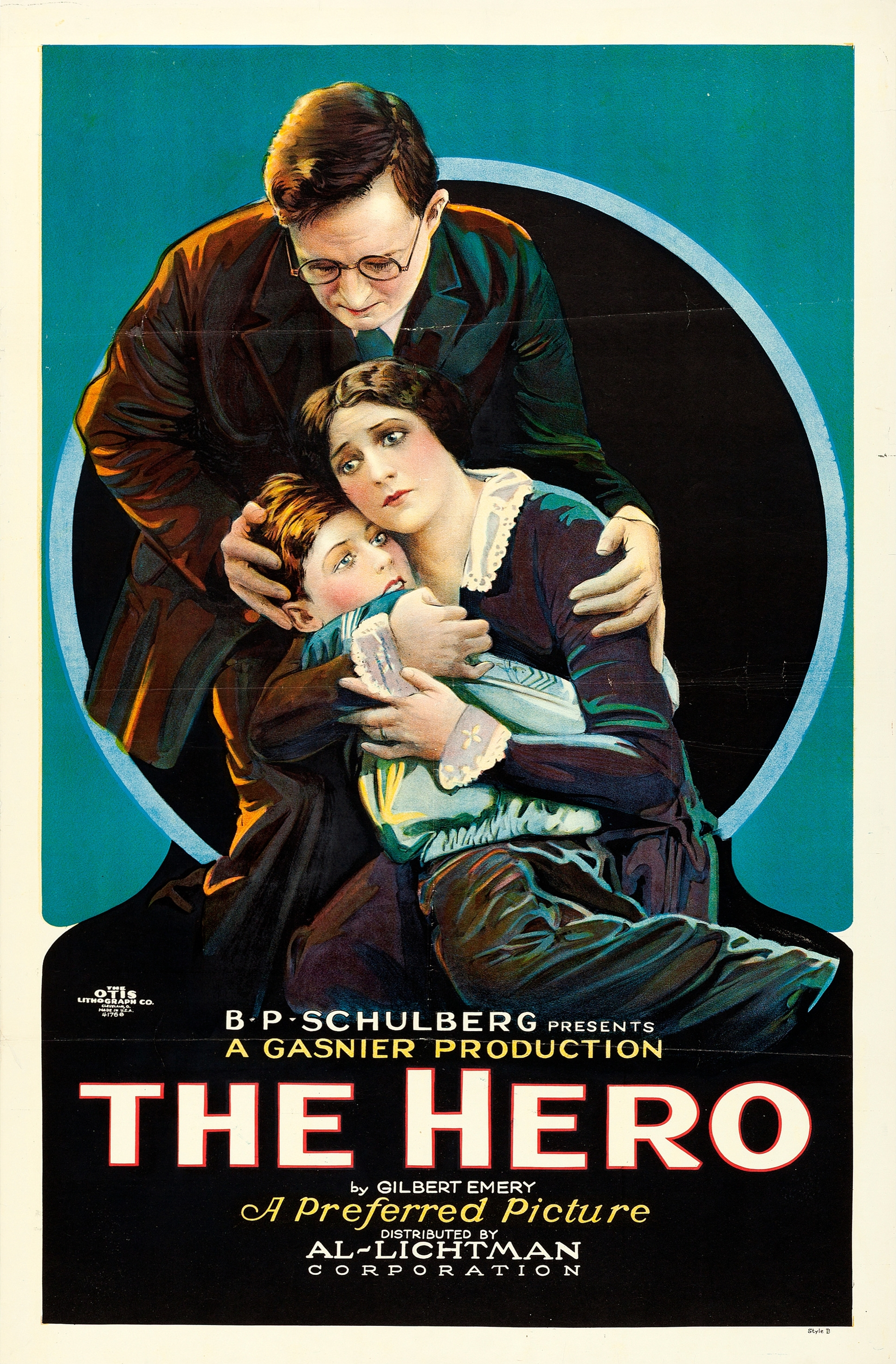
The Hero (1923)

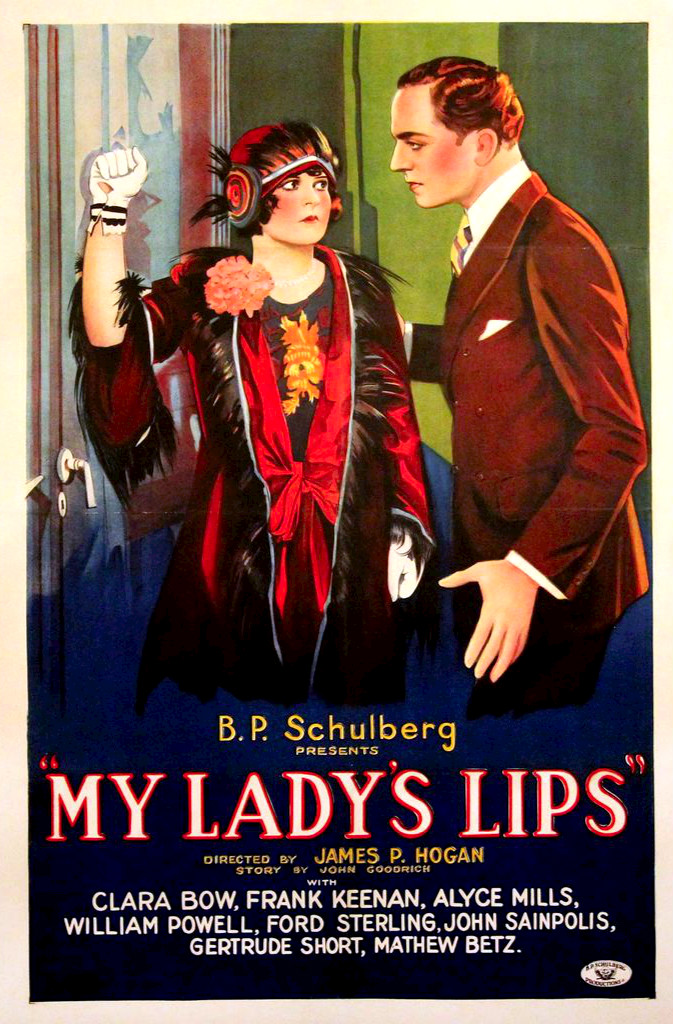
My Lady's Lips (1925)

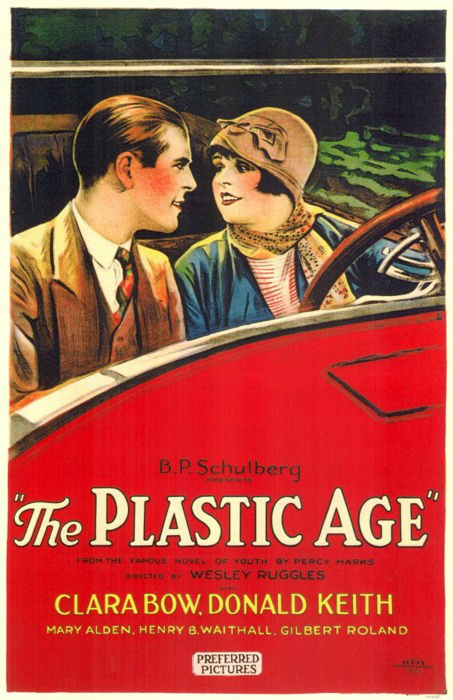
The Plastic Age (1925)

Preferred Pictures was an American film production company of the silent era. Founded in 1920 by the producer B. P. Schulberg following his departure from Paramount Pictures, it was an independent, either distributing its own films or releasing them through First National Pictures. Schulberg's partners were J. G. Bachmann and Al Lichtman, and many of the company's earliest productions featured the actress Katherine MacDonald. She was replaced as the company's leading star by Clara Bow.

In 1925 the company ran into financial trouble. Schulberg was lured back to Paramount and brought Bow with him. The final few releases under the Preferred Pictures label were released in 1926. Many of these were released by the company only in certain states, with other distributors handling them in other regions.

== Filmography ==
- The Beautiful Liar (1921)
- The Woman's Side (1922)
- The Infidel (1922)
- Rich Men's Wives (1922)
- Heroes and Husbands (1922)
- White Shoulders (1922)
- Shadows (1922)
- Domestic Relations (1922)
- Thorns and Orange Blossoms (1922)
- The Woman Conquers (1922)
- The Hero (1923)
- Are You a Failure? (1923)
- April Showers (1923)
- Poor Men's Wives (1923)
- Money! Money! Money! (1923)
- Refuge (1923)
- The Girl Who Came Back (1923)
- The Lonely Road (1923)
- Daughters of the Rich (1923)
- The Scarlet Lily (1923)
- Mothers-in-Law (1923)
- Don't Marry for Money (1923)
- The Virginian (1923)
- Maytime (1923)
- The Broken Wing (1923)
- Chastity (1923)
- Poisoned Paradise (1924)
- The Breath of Scandal (1924)
- White Man (1924)
- The Triflers (1924)
- Capital Punishment (1925)
- The Mansion of Aching Hearts (1925)
- North Star (1925)
- The Blind Trail (1925)
- The Boomerang (1925)
- Faint Perfume (1925)
- My Lady's Lips (1925)
- The Parasite (1925)
- The Lawful Cheater (1925)
- Go Straight (1925)
- Parisian Love (1925)
- Perils of the Rail (1925)
- The Other Woman's Story (1925)
- The Girl Who Wouldn't Work (1925)
- With This Ring (1925)
- Free to Love (1925)
- The Plastic Age (1925)
- Lew Tyler's Wives (1926)
- The Romance of a Million Dollars (1926)
- Dancing Days (1926)
- His New York Wife (1926)
- Exclusive Rights (1926)
- Shameful Behavior? (1926)

== Bibliography ==
- Slide, Anthony. The New Historical Dictionary of the American Film Industry. Routledge, 2014.
