= The Hero (1923 film) =

1923 film

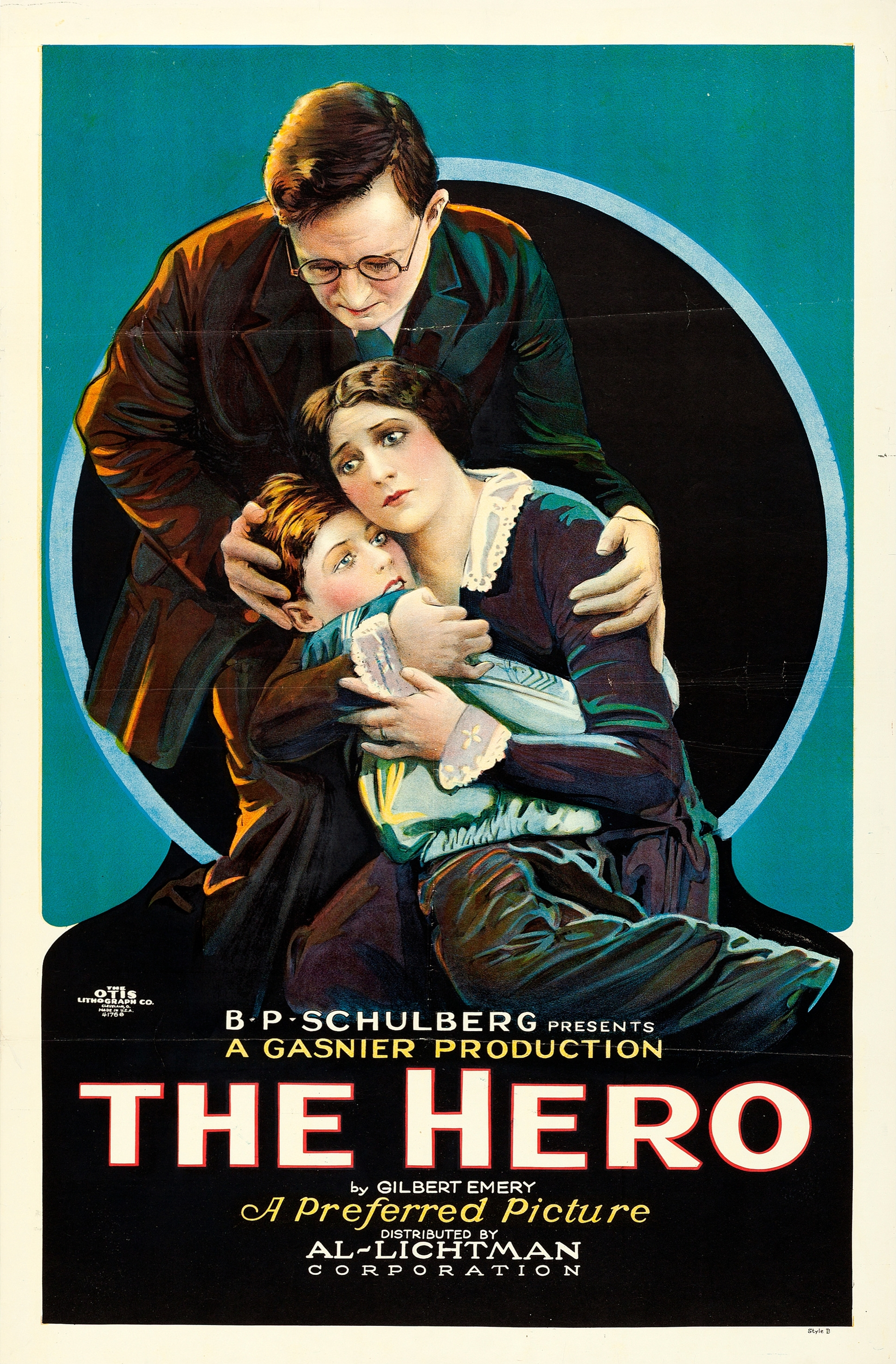
- Theatrical release poster
- Directed by: Louis J. Gasnier
- Written by: Eve Unsell
- Based on: The Hero by Gilbert Emery
- Produced by: B.P. Schulberg
- Starring: Gaston Glass; Barbara La Marr; John St. Polis
- Cinematography: Karl Struss
- Production company: B.P. Schulberg Productions
- Distributed by: Preferred Pictures
- Release date: January 1, 1923
- Running time: 70 minutes
- Country: United States
- Language: Silent (English intertitles)

The Hero is a 1923 American silent drama film directed by Louis J. Gasnier and starring Gaston Glass, Barbara La Marr, and John St. Polis. It is based upon the 1921 play of the same name by Gilbert Emery.

== Cast ==
- Gaston Glass as Oswald Lane
- Barbara La Marr as Hester Lane
- John St. Polis as Andrew Lane
- Martha Mattox as Sarah Lane
- Frankie Lee as Andy Lane
- David Butler as Bill Walters
- Doris Pawn as Martha
- Ethel Shannon as Hilda Pierce
- Miriam Cooper as Martha Baker

== Preservation ==
With no holdings located in archives, The Hero is considered a lost film.

== Bibliography ==
- Munden, Kenneth White. The American Film Institute Catalog of Motion Pictures Produced in the United States, Part 1. University of California Press, 1997.
