= Robert Frazer =

American actor (1891–1944)

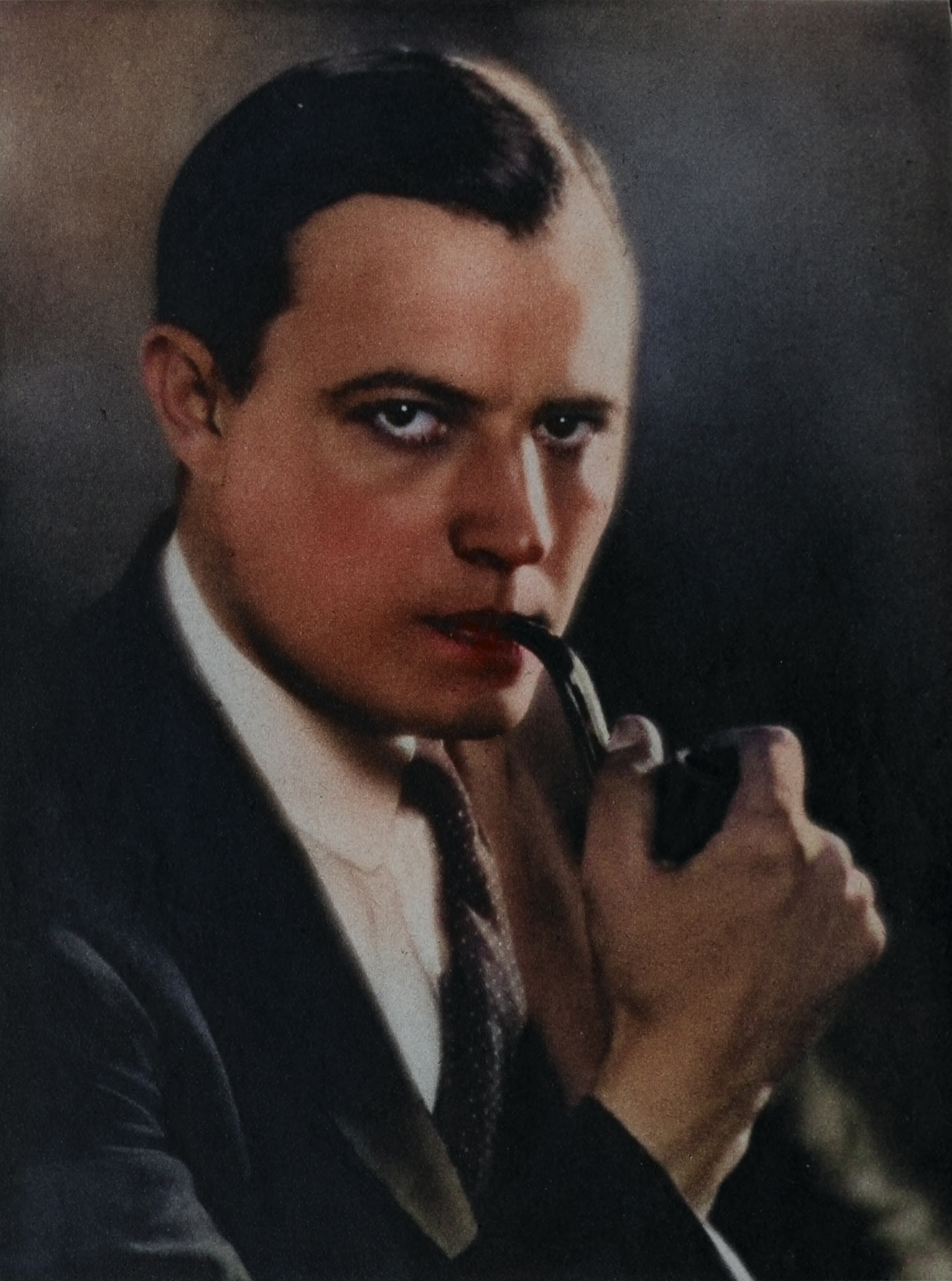
- Motion Picture Classic, 1923
- Born: Robert William Browne; June 29, 1891; Worcester, Massachusetts; U.S.
- Died: August 17, 1944 (age 53); Los Angeles, California; U.S.
- Occupations: Stage and film actor
- Years active: 1912–1944

Robert Frazer (born Robert William Browne, June 29, 1891 – August 17, 1944) was an American actor who appeared in some 224 shorts and films from the 1910s until his death. (Note: The reference book Encyclopedia of American Film Serials gives his full birth name as "Robert William Frazer".) He began in films with the Eclair company which released through Universal Pictures.

== Early years ==
Frazer was born in Worcester, Massachusetts, and educated in Massachusetts. When he was young, he worked in a grocery store during vacations and spent much of his spare time reading plays and literature about becoming an actor. He also staged backyard plays for his friends.

== Acting career ==
Frazer acted with several repertory companies, including the Cosgrove Stock Company, toured the United States in productions, and performed on Broadway in Seremonda (1917).

After some theater experience he swiftly moved into acting in silent films. In 1912 he began his movie career by portraying Jesus Christ in The Holy City, and in the same year played the lead in Robin Hood. He also appeared in two classic horror films, White Zombie (1932) and The Vampire Bat (1933).

== Personal life and death ==
Frazer was married to Mildred Bright, an actress.

On August 17, 1944, Frazer died of leukemia in Los Angeles, California. He was 53.

== Partial filmography ==
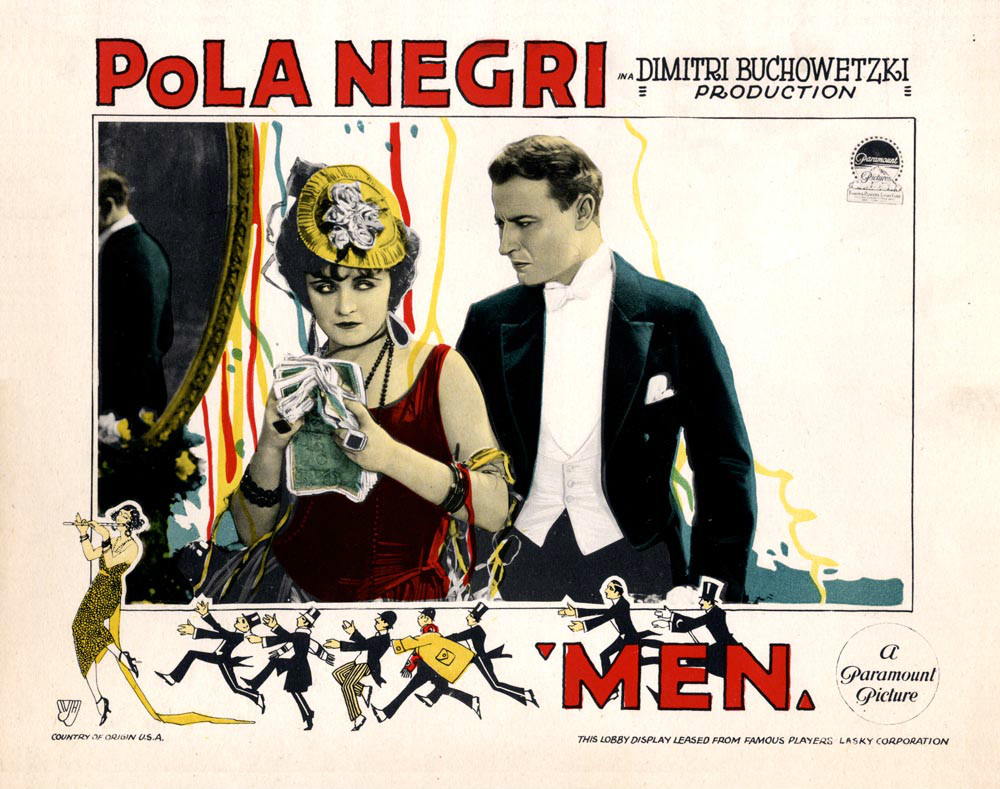
Pola Negri and Frazer in Men (1924)

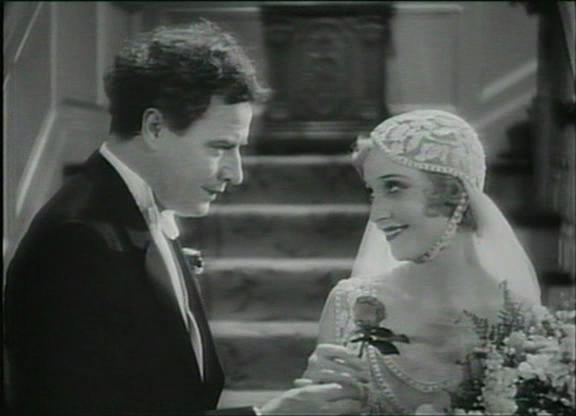
Frazer with Madge Bellamy in White Zombie (1932)

- The Holy City (1912)
- Robin Hood (1912)
- Rob Roy (1913)
- Duty (1914)
- The Lone Star Rush (1915) (filmed in Palm Springs, California)
- The Decoy (1916)
- The Light at Dusk (1916)
- The Ballet Girl (1916)
- The Dawn of Love (1916)
- The Feast of Life (1916)
- Her Code of Honor (1919)
- Bolshevism on Trial (1919)
- Fascination (1922)
- My Friend the Devil (1922)
- How Women Love (1922)
- When the Desert Calls (1922)
- Mr. Potter of Texas (1922)
- As a Man Lives (1923)
- Jazzmania (1923)
- The Love Piker (1923)
- After the Ball (1924)
- Women Who Give (1924)
- Traffic in Hearts (1924)
- Men (1924)
- When a Man's a Man (1924)
- The Foolish Virgin (1924)
- The Charmer (1925)
- Miss Bluebeard (1925)
- The White Desert (1925)
- The Other Woman's Story (1925)
- The Love Gamble (1925)
- The Scarlet West (1925)
- The Keeper of the Bees (1925)
- Why Women Love (1925)
- Secret Orders (1926)
- Sin Cargo (1926)
- The Speeding Venus (1926)
- Desert Gold (1926)
- Dame Chance (1926)
- The Isle of Retribution (1926)
- The City (1926)
- One Hour of Love (1927)
- The Silent Hero (1927)
- Lightning (1927)
- Out of the Past (1927)
- Back to God's Country (1927)
- Burning Up Broadway (1928)
- The City of Purple Dreams (1928)
- Black Butterflies (1928)
- Out of the Ruins (1928)
- Sioux Blood (1929)
- The Woman I Love (1929)
- The Drake Case (1929)
- Beyond the Law (1930)
- Two-Gun Caballero (1931)
- Ten Nights in a Bar-Room (1931)
- Mystery Trooper (1931) rare serial
- The King Murder (1932)
- The Arm of the Law (1932)
- White Zombie (1932)
- The Three Musketeers (1933)
- The Mystery Squadron (1933)
- The Vampire Bat (1933)
- The Fighting Parson (1933)
- Found Alive (1933)
- Love Past Thirty (1934)
- Green Eyes (1934)
- One in a Million (1934)
- The Clutching Hand (1935)
- The Fighting Pilot (1935)
- Trails of The Wild (1935)
- Million Dollar Haul (1935)
- The Black Coin (1936)
- Easy Money (1936)
- We're in the Legion Now! (1936)
- Left-Handed Law (1937)
- Black Aces (1937)
- Religious Racketeers (1938)
- Cipher Bureau (1938)
- Law of the Wolf (1939)
- Navy Secrets (1939)
- Crashing Thru (1939)
- Roar of the Press (1941)
- Pals of the Pecos (1941)
- Gangs of Sonora (1941)
- Black Dragons (1942)
- Inside the Law (1942)
- Seeing Hands (1943)
- Captain America (1944, Serial)
- Forty Thieves (1944)
- Law Men (1944)
