= With This Ring (1925 film) =

1925 film

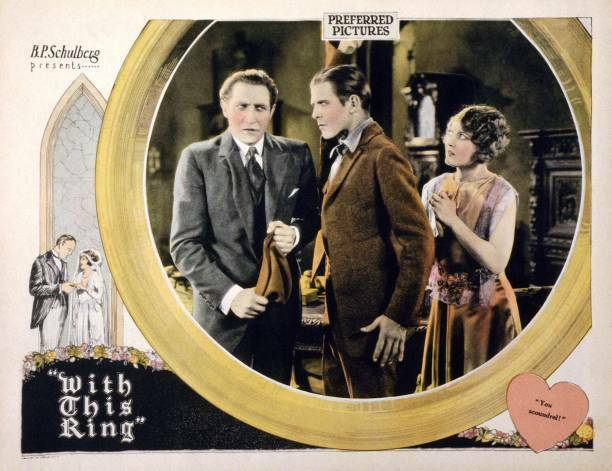
- Lobby card
- Directed by: Fred Windemere
- Based on: With This Ring by Fanny Heaslip Lea
- Produced by: B. P. Schulberg
- Starring: Alyce Mills; Forrest Stanley; Lou Tellegen
- Cinematography: Conrad Wells
- Production company: B.P. Schulberg Productions
- Distributed by: Preferred Pictures; Warner Bros. (UK)
- Release date: September 5, 1925
- Running time: 60 minutes
- Country: United States
- Language: Silent (English intertitles)

With This Ring is a 1925 American silent drama film directed by Fred Windemere and starring Alyce Mills, Forrest Stanley, and Lou Tellegen. In America it was distributed by the independent outfit Preferred Pictures while its British release was originally to be handled by Vitagraph, before that company was acquired by Warner Bros. who distributed it on the British market in 1926. A print of With This Ring exists in the George Eastman Museum film archive.

== Synopsis ==
While marooned on a desert island, Cecilie Vaughn and Donald Van Buren live as man and wife and she falls pregnant. Donald is attacked and believed dead and Cecilie is rescued. She visits his wealthy family, but they refuse to recognize her or her son and Donald's brother Rufus offers to make her his mistress. She agrees instead to a marriage proposal from the kindly family lawyer, before Donald returns and they are reunited.

== Cast ==
- Alyce Mills as Cecilie Vaughn
- Forrest Stanley as John Wendell
- Lou Tellegen as Rufus Van Buren
- Donald Keith as Donald Van Buren
- Dick Sutherland as The Portuguese
- Martha Mattox as Luella Van Buren
- Joan Standing as Cecilie's maid
- Eulalie Jensen as Tabitha Van Buren

== Bibliography ==
- Connelly, Robert B. The Silents: Silent Feature Films, 1910-36, Volume 40, Issue 2. December Press, 1998.
- Munden, Kenneth White. The American Film Institute Catalog of Motion Pictures Produced in the United States, Part 1. University of California Press, 1997.
