= Allen G. Siegler =

American cinematographer (1892–1960)

- Born: Allen Graydon Siegler; June 26, 1892; Newark, New Jersey, USA
- Died: September 21, 1960 (aged 68); Los Angeles, California, USA
- Occupation: Cinematographer

Allen G. Siegler was an American cinematographer who lensed nearly 200 films and television episodes between 1914 and 1952. He worked at Columbia Pictures for many years, and was an early member of the American Society of Cinematographers.

== Biography ==
Allen was born in Newark, New Jersey, in 1892 to Frederick Siegler and Flora Wood. He started working as a cameraman around 1914, picking up dozens of credits over the ensuing decades on films by directors like Lois Weber and Sam Newfield. During World War II, he took a break from Hollywood to serve in the U.S. Naval Reserve's photographic and motion picture unit. He had two daughters with his wife, Gertrude.

== Partial filmography ==
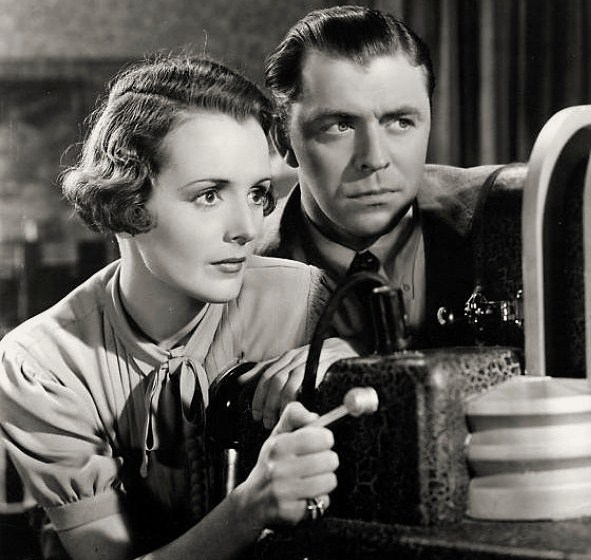
Mary Astor and Lyle Talbot in Trapped by Television.

- The Broken Coin (1915)
- The Dumb Girl of Portici (1916)
- Shoes (1916)
- Saving the Family Name (1916)
- Idle Wives (1916)
- The Hand That Rocks the Cradle (1917)
- The Price of a Good Time (1917)
- The Doctor and the Woman (1918)
- Danger, Go Slow (1918)
- Modern Love (1918)
- The Scarlet Shadow (1919)
- The Delicious Little Devil (1919)
- What Am I Bid? (1919)
- The Unpainted Woman (1919)
- April Folly (1920)
- The Restless Sex (1920)
- Over the Wire (1921)
- The Truant Husband (1921)
- The Inside of the Cup (1921)
- Kisses (1922)
- The Dangerous Age (1922)
- Slippy McGee (1923)
- A Fool's Awakening (1924)
- The Fighting Sheriff (1925)
- Faint Perfume (1925)
- My Lady's Lips (1925)
- White Thunder (1925)
- The Human Tornado (1925)
- Parisian Love (1925)
- The Other Woman's Story (1925)
- Laddie (1926)
- Breed of the Sea (1926)
- Enemies of Society (1927)
- The Magic Garden (1927)
- Judgment of the Hills (1927)
- Not for Publication (1927)
- The Harvester (1927)
- Driftin' Sands (1928)
- The Big Hop (1928)
- Pointed Heels (1929)
- Burning Up (1930)
- L'Énigmatique Monsieur Parkes (1930)
- Sea Legs (1930)
- Take the Heir (1930)
- The Sky Raiders (1931)
- Hell's House (1932)
- Damaged Lives (1933)
- Unknown Valley (1933)
- Meet the Baron (1933)
- Against the Law (1934)
- The Crime of Helen Stanley (1934)
- The Calling of Dan Matthews (1935)
- You May Be Next! (1936)
- Roaming Lady (1936)
- Trapped by Television (1936)
- Blackmailer (1936)
- Killer at Large (1936)
- The Cowboy Star (1936)
- Counterfeit Lady (1936)
- Woman in Distress (1936)
- Trapped (1937)
- Two-Fisted Sheriff (1937)
- The Devil Is Driving (1937)
- Playing the Ponies (1937)
- The Old Wyoming Trail (1937)
- No Time to Marry (1938)
- Tassels in the Air (1938)
- Healthy, Wealthy and Dumb (1938)
- The Main Event (1938)
- Smashing the Spy Ring (1938)
- The Lone Wolf Spy Hunt (1939)
- Beware Spooks! (1939)
- My Son Is a Criminal (1939)
- Romance of the Redwoods (1939)
- Saved by the Belle (1939)
- Behind Prison Gates (1939)
- Five Little Peppers at Home (1940)
- How High Is Up? (1940)
- Military Academy (1940)
- Shadows on the Stairs (1941)
- Strange Alibi (1941)
- Adventure in Washington (1941)
- The Body Disappears (1941)
- Sing While You Dance (1946)
- The Secret of the Whistler (1946)
- The Lone Wolf in Mexico (1947)
- Millie's Daughter (1947)
- Devil Ship (1947)
- All Gummed Up (1947)
- Shivering Sherlocks (1948)
- The Wreck of the Hesperus (1948)
- Pardon My Clutch (1948)
- Port Said (1948)
- Fiddlers Three (1948)
- Inner Sanctum (1948)
- Mummy's Dummies (1948)
- Air Hostess (1949)
- Smuggler's Gold (1951)
- Never Trust a Gambler (1951)
- Merry Mavericks (1951)
- Unknown World (1951)
