= Martha Mattox =

American actress (1879–1933)

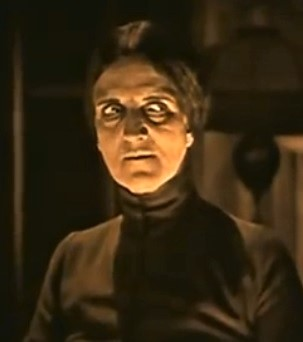
- Mattox in The Cat and the Canary (1927)
- Born: Eleanor Perry Mellen; June 19, 1879; Natchez, Mississippi, U.S.
- Died: May 2, 1933 (aged 53); Sidney, New York, U.S.
- Education: East Mississippi Female College
- Occupation: Actress
- Years active: 1913 - 1933
- Spouse: Archibald Junius Sneed
- Children: 5

Martha Mattox (born Eleanor Perry Mellen; June 19, 1879 – May 2, 1933) was an American silent film actress most notable for her portrayal of Mammy Pleasant in the 1927 film The Cat and the Canary. She also played a role in Torrent (1926). She died from a heart ailment at age 53.

== Early years ==
Born Eleanor Perry Mellen in Natchez, Mississippi, Mattox was the daughter of Thomas Lewis Mellen and Mary Eleanor Mellen. She attended East Mississippi College, where she studied dramatic art. (Another source gives the school's name as East Mississippi Female College, with graduation in 1892.) A 1923 article in the Calgary Herald newspaper described her as "a full-blooded Creole", of Spanish descent on her father's side and French on her mother's. She taught for several years at Holding Seminary.

== Career ==
Her initial acting was on stage, including performances with the Marion Leonard Company. After working on stage, she began performing in films, initially in Westerns and action films and later in melodramas and comedies. Her film debut came in 1915, and she played a variety of roles in the silent-film era.

== Personal life and death ==
Mattox married Arichbald J. Sneed Jr. on July 29, 1897, in Canton, Mississippi, and they had five children.

Activities in Mattox's personal life included donating prizes and selecting winners in the Better Baby Exposition.

On May 2, 1933, Mattox died of heart disease in Sidney, New York, at age 53.

== Partial filmography ==
- Buckshot John (1915) (uncredited)
- The Hungry Actors (1915 short) (uncredited)
- Bucking Broadway (1917) (uncredited)
- The Charmer (1917)
- The Clean-Up (1917)
- Polly Put the Kettle On (1917)
- Wild Women (1918)
- Thieves' Gold (1918)
- The Scarlet Drop (1918)
- Danger, Go Slow (1918) (uncredited)
- Ace High (1919)
- The Wicked Darling (1919)
- The Scarlet Shadow (1919)
- The Sheriff's Oath (1920)
- The Butterfly Man (1920)
- Huckleberry Finn (1920)
- Old Lady 31 (1920)
- The Girl of My Heart (1920)
- A Cumberland Romance (1920)
- Conflict (1921)
- A Game Chicken (1922)
- Rich Men's Wives (1922)
- The Angel of Crooked Street (1922)
- Beauty's Worth (1922)
- The Hands of Nara (1922)
- Restless Souls (1922)
- Top o' the Morning (1922)
- Hearts Aflame (1923)
- Three Wise Fools (1923)
- Bavu (1923)
- Red Lights (1923)
- The Hero (1923)
- Maytime (1923)
- Look Your Best (1923)
- The Family Secret (1924)
- Oh Doctor (1925)
- Dangerous Innocence (1925)
- With This Ring (1925)
- The Man in Blue (1925)
- The Keeper of the Bees (1925)
- The Home Maker (1925)
- Heir-Loons (1925)
- Infatuation (1925)
- Torrent (1926)
- Christine of the Big Tops (1926)
- Shameful Behavior? (1926)
- Forest Havoc (1926)
- Twinkletoes (1926)
- The Nutcracker (1926)
- The Yankee Señor (1926)
- The Warning Signal (1926)
- Snowbound (1927)
- The Devil Dancer (1927)
- The Cat and the Canary (1927)
- Her Wild Oat (1927)
- The Thirteenth Juror (1927)
- Old San Francisco (1927)
- Finger Prints (1927)
- The Little Shepherd of Kingdom Come (1928)
- Fools for Luck (1928)
- The Wreck of the Singapore (1928)
- A Bit of Heaven (1928)
- The Naughty Duchess (1928)
- The Fatal Warning (1929)
- Montmartre Rose (1929)
- The Love Racket (1929)
- Born to Love (1931)
- Misbehaving Ladies (1931)
- Murder by the Clock (1931)
- Dynamite Ranch (1932)
- The Monster Walks (1932)
- Heroes of the West (1932)
- Haunted Gold (1932)
