= The Other Woman's Story =

1925 film

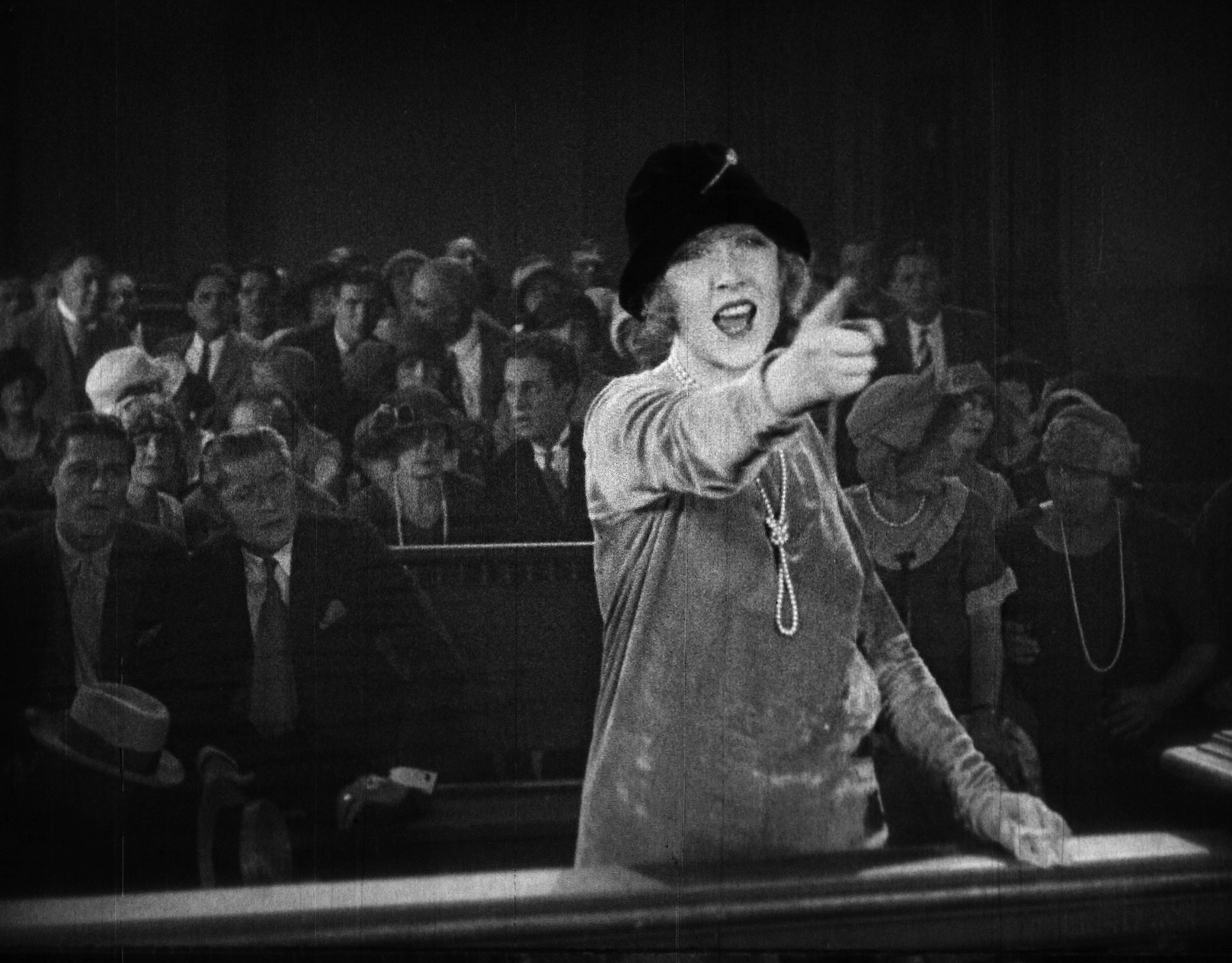
- Still
- Directed by: B.F. Stanley
- Written by: John F. Goodrich
- Story by: Peggy Gaddis
- Produced by: B.P. Schulberg
- Starring: Alice Calhoun; Robert Frazer; Helen Lee Worthing
- Cinematography: Allen G. Siegler; Gilbert Warrenton
- Production company: B.P. Schulberg Productions
- Distributed by: Preferred Pictures; Warner Bros. (UK)
- Release date: November 15, 1925
- Running time: 60 minutes
- Country: United States
- Language: Silent (English intertitles)

The Other Woman's Story is a 1925 American silent drama film directed by B.F. Stanley and starring Alice Calhoun, Robert Frazer, and Helen Lee Worthing. In America it was distributed by the independent outfit Preferred Pictures while its British release was originally to be handled by Vitagraph, before that company was acquired by Warner Bros. who distributed it on the British market.

== Plot ==
The Other Woman's Story (1925)

As described in a film magazine review, Mrs. Colby, a woman seeking a divorce and naming her husband's female business partner Jean Prentiss as a co-respondent, retains an attorney who, before his work is finished, is murdered. Suspicion points to the husband. The woman named as the co-respondent uncovers evidence that proves the wife guilty of the murder, killing Robert Marshall in a jealous rage. With this evidence, Jean reverses the verdict of guilty brought against her new husband.

== Cast ==
- Alice Calhoun as Mrs. Colby
- Robert Frazer as Colman Colby
- Helen Lee Worthing as Jean Prentiss
- David Torrence as Judge
- Riza Royce as Maid
- Mahlon Hamilton as Robert Marshall
- Gertrude Short as Gertie Van
- Ellinor Vanderveer as Party Guest (uncredited)

== Bibliography ==
- Connelly, Robert B. The Silents: Silent Feature Films, 1910-36, Volume 40, Issue 2. December Press, 1998.
- Munden, Kenneth White. The American Film Institute Catalog of Motion Pictures Produced in the United States, Part 1. University of California Press, 1997.
