= The Scarlet Shadow =

1919 film directed by Robert Zigler Leonard

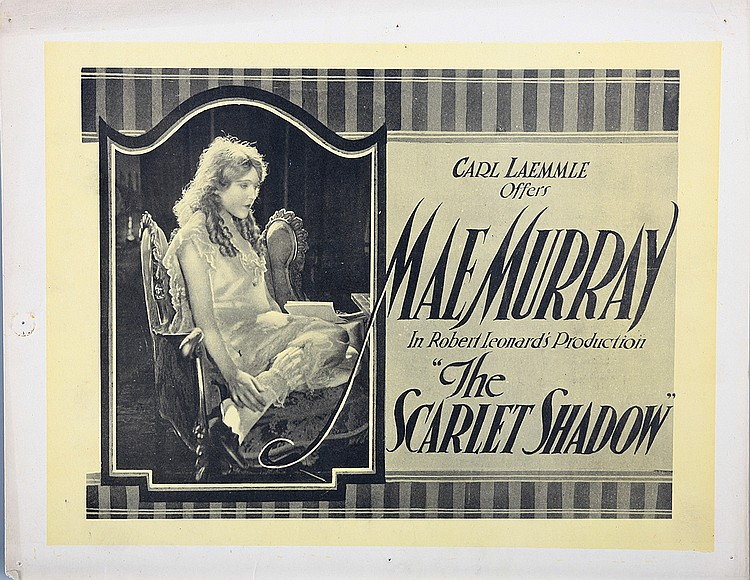
- Directed by: Robert Z. Leonard
- Written by: Harvey F. Thew
- Based on: "The Scarlet Strain" by Lorne H. Fontaine and Katherine Leiser Robbins
- Starring: Mae Murray; Ralph Graves; Martha Mattox
- Cinematography: Allen G. Siegler
- Production company: Universal Pictures
- Distributed by: Universal Pictures
- Release date: March 10, 1919
- Country: United States
- Languages: Silent; English intertitles

The Scarlet Shadow is a 1919 American silent comedy film directed by Robert Z. Leonard and starring Mae Murray, Martha Mattox and Frank Elliott. It was adapted for the screen by Harvey F. Thew based on a novelette by Katherine Leiser Robbins titled "The Scarlet Strain," which had originally appeared in The All-Story Magazine.

Location shooting for the film took place in Lake Tahoe, Nevada.

== Cast ==
- Mae Murray as Elena Evans
- Martha Mattox as Aunt Alvira Evans
- Frank Elliott as Harvey Presby
- Ralph Graves as Van Presby
- Clarissa Selwynne as Edith Presby
- Willard Louis as Joseph Fleming
- J. Edwin Brown as The Gardner

== Preservation ==
The Scarlet Shadow is currently presumed lost. In February of 2021, the film was cited by the National Film Preservation Board on their Lost U.S. Silent Feature Films list.

== Bibliography ==
- Michael G. Ankerich. Mae Murray: The Girl with the Bee-stung Lips. University Press of Kentucky, 2012.
