= The Triflers (1924 film) =

1924 film by Louis J. Gasnier

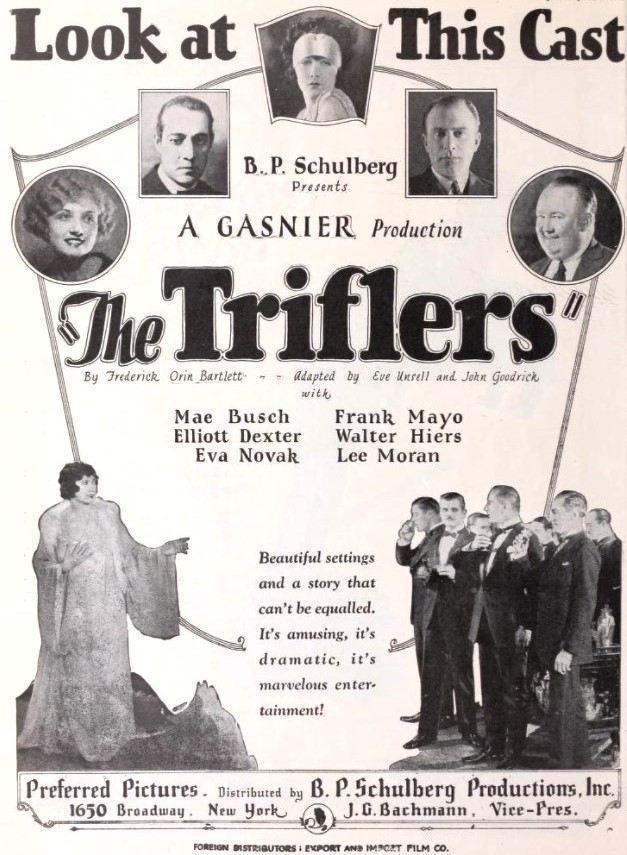
- Advertisement
- Directed by: Louis Gasnier
- Written by: Eve Unsell; John F. Goodrich
- Based on: The Triflers by Frederick Orin Bartlett
- Produced by: B. P. Schulberg
- Starring: Mae Busch
- Cinematography: William Tuers
- Distributed by: Preferred Pictures; Al Lichtman
- Release date: December 15, 1924
- Running time: 70 min.
- Country: United States
- Language: Silent (English intertitles)

The Triflers is a 1924 American silent society drama film directed by Louis Gasnier and starring Mae Busch. It was produced by B. P. Schulberg and distributed by Preferred Pictures and Al Lichtman.

== Plot ==
As described in a review in a film magazine, after inheriting great wealth, Marjorie (Busch) is besieged by suitors but she gives them all the cold shoulder. For one, Peter (Dexter), she feels pity and a touch of seriousness. One friend, Monte (Mayo), refuses to run after her and treats affairs with women lightly. In California they meet. When Teddy (Whitlock), one of the suitors, refuses to accept no, Monte saves Marjorie from an unpleasant situation and, without love, they marry for their mutual protection. After the wedding they both slip away following a few embarrassing moments in the bedroom and end up sleeping away from each other in bathtubs. Monte still treats her casually and she falls desperately in love with him. Marjorie again meets Peter who has become blind and he mistakes her pity for love, while Monte gets the same impression and decides to go away. Marjorie and Peter finally declare their love for each other, but Teddy in jealousy shoots them. The wounds are slight and in the hospital in twin beds, they feel they have atoned for being triflers with love, and face the future confidently.

== Cast ==
- Mae Busch as Marjorie Stockton
- Elliott Dexter as Peter Noyes
- Frank Mayo as Monte Covington
- Walter Hiers as Chick Warren
- Eva Novak as Beatrice Noyes
- Lloyd Whitlock as Teddy Hamilton

== Preservation status ==
A print of The Triflers is preserved in the Library of Congress collection.
