= Parisian Love =

1925 film

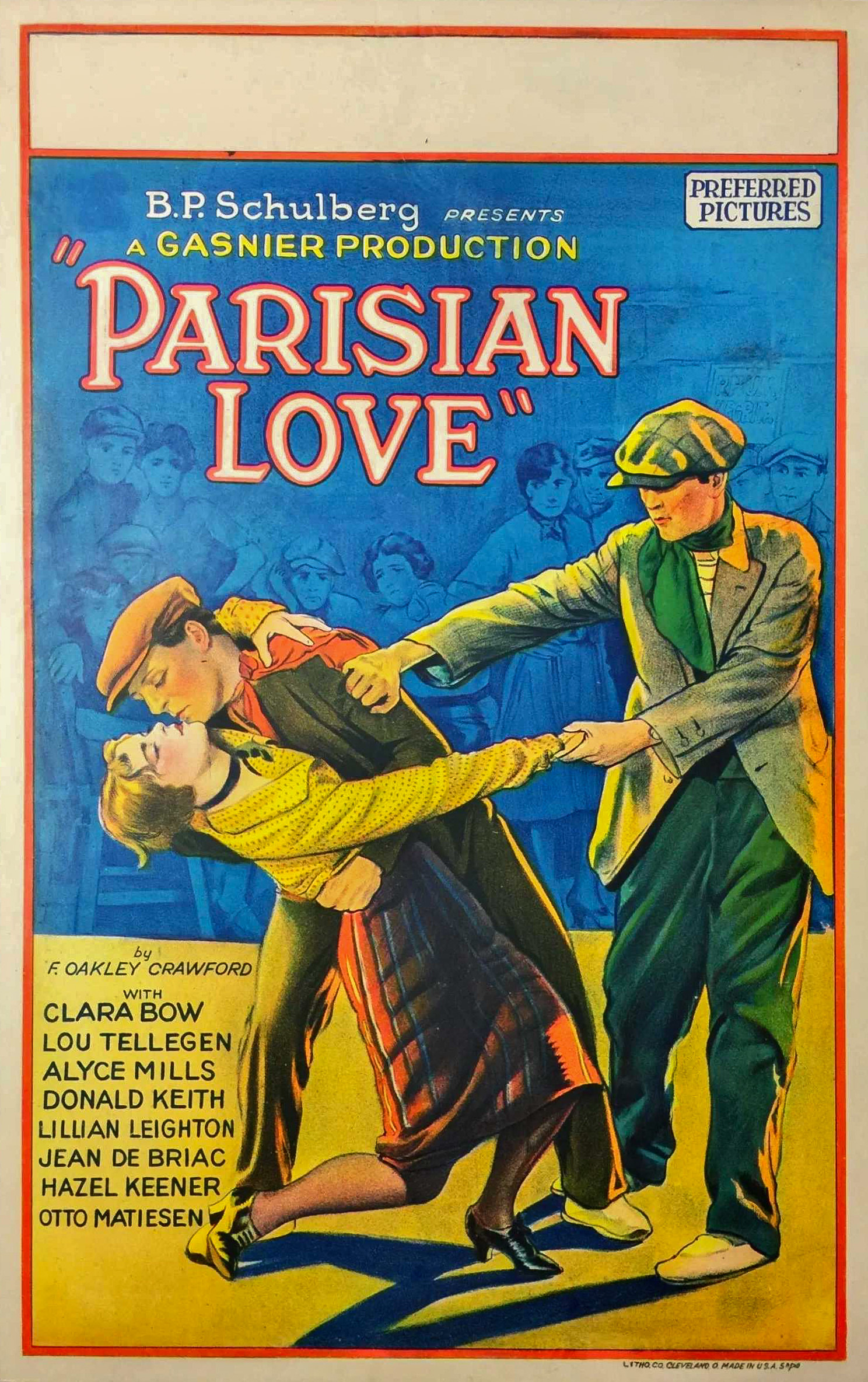
- Directed by: Louis J. Gasnier
- Written by: F. Oakley Crawford (story); Lois Hutchinson (adaptation)
- Produced by: B. P. Schulberg
- Starring: Clara Bow
- Cinematography: Allen G. Siegler
- Distributed by: Preferred Pictures; Al Lichtman; Independent Sales Corporation (State's Rights)
- Release date: August 1, 1925
- Running time: 70 minutes; 7 reels (6,324 feet)
- Country: United States
- Language: Silent (English intertitles)

Parisian Love is a black and white 1925 American silent romantic crime drama film directed by Louis J. Gasnier and starring Clara Bow. The film was produced by B.P. Schulberg Productions. A copy of this film still survives.

== Plot ==
Street gangsters Armand and Marie are madly in love, and she persuades Armand and other gang members to rob the home of Pierre Marcel, a wealthy scientist. The police break up the robbery but Pierre hides Armand from them because he kept a gang member from stabbing him, but Armand is wounded in doing so. As Armand regains his health, Pierre sets him up with the beautiful Jean D'Arcy, and Armand has no objections. Marie – jealous of Jean – swears revenge on Pierre. They meet and he falls in love with her, and they are married while Armand is away in London. On their wedding night, Marie tells Pierre she is an Apache and her revenge is complete, and she rushes into Armand's arms. But her fellow gang members, who helped her deceive Pierre, shoot her. As she recovers Pierre leaves for America and gets a divorce so she can be with Armand.

== Cast ==
- Clara Bow as Marie
- Donald Keith as Armand
- Lillian Leighton as Frouchard
- J. Gordon Russell as D'Avril
- Hazel Keener as Margot
- Lou Tellegen as Pierre Marcel
- Jean De Briac as Knifer
- Otto Matieson as Apache Leader
- Alyce Mills as Jean D'Arcy
- Julian Rivero as Party Guest (uncredited)
