= The Keeper of the Bees (1925 film) =

1925 film by James Leo Meehan

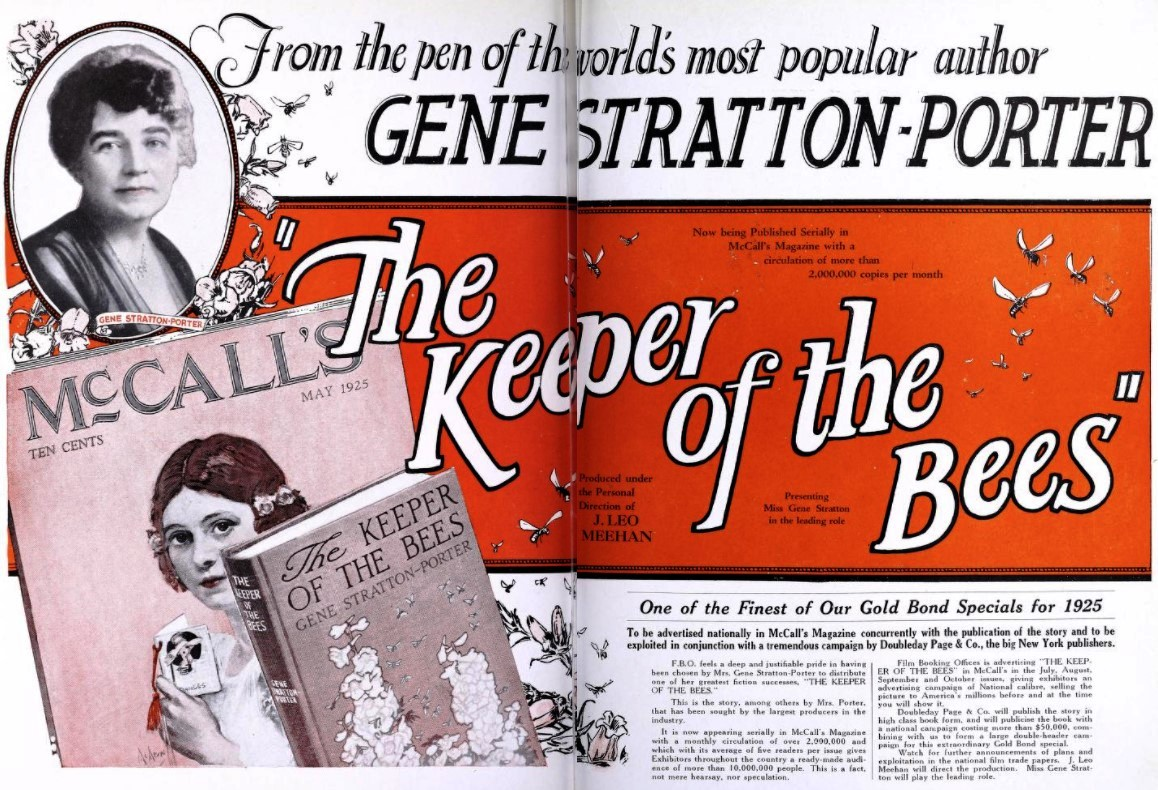
- Advertisement
- Directed by: James Leo Meehan
- Screenplay by: James Leo Meehan
- Based on: The Keeper of the Bees by Gene Stratton-Porter
- Starring: Robert Frazer; Josef Swickard; Martha Mattox; Clara Bow; Alyce Mills; Gene Stratton
- Cinematography: John W. Boyle
- Production company: Gene Stratton Porter Productions
- Distributed by: Film Booking Offices of America
- Release date: September 6, 1925
- Running time: 70 minutes
- Country: United States
- Language: Silent (English intertitles)

The Keeper of the Bees is a 1925 American silent drama film written and directed by James Leo Meehan. It is based on the 1925 novel The Keeper of the Bees by Gene Stratton-Porter. The film stars Robert Frazer, Josef Swickard, Martha Mattox, Clara Bow, Alyce Mills, and Gene Stratton. The film was released on September 6, 1925, by Film Booking Offices of America.

== Plot ==
James Lewis MacFarlane, a World War I hero, has been spending his post-war days in government hospitals, having his war wounds healed by the best doctors. However, he soon learns that he has only one year to live. With this information, James decides to leave the hospital, and his only hope for an unlikely recovery, to spend his last year experiencing the world. James meets The Bee Master along the way, an old veteran who lives alone and takes care of hundreds of bees. When The Bee Master falls ill, James is trusted to take care of the bees while The Bee Master is away. While The Bee Master is away James meets the bees’ other caretaker, Little Scout, an 11 year old boy. James meets a young woman by the waterside, who is about to drown herself due to getting pregnant out of wedlock, and they soon get married. Upon getting married, his wife disappears and leaves a note signed “Alice Louise MacFarlane”. With the help of a neighbor, Margaret Cameron, James’ wounds heal and he regains his health. The Bee Master eventually succumbs to his illness, leaving James and Little Scout to care for the bees. When Little Scout reacts to The Bee Master’s passing, Little Scout is revealed to be a girl dressing and acting as a boy. Soon after The Bee Master’s death, James gets a call saying that his wife has had a child. He rushes to the hospital only to find another woman in bed wearing the ring he gave his “wife”. This woman, Alice Louise, dies in childbirth, and the woman he actually married, Molly Cameron (Margaret Cameron’s daughter) shows up and reveals that she married James under her sister’s name to protect her reputation. In the end, James remarries Molly and they live together, taking care of the bees with Little Scout and Alice’s child.

== Cast ==
- Robert Frazer as James Lewis MacFarlane
- Josef Swickard as Michael Worthington / Bee Master
- Martha Mattox as Margaret Cameron
- Clara Bow as Alice Louise Cameron
- Alyce Mills as Molly Cameron
- Gene Stratton as Little Scout
- Joe Coppa as Angel Face
- Ainse Charland as Fat Ole Bill
- Billy Osborne as Nice Child

== Preservation ==
- This is now a lost film. A trailer survives.
