= B. P. Schulberg =

American film producer (1892–1957)

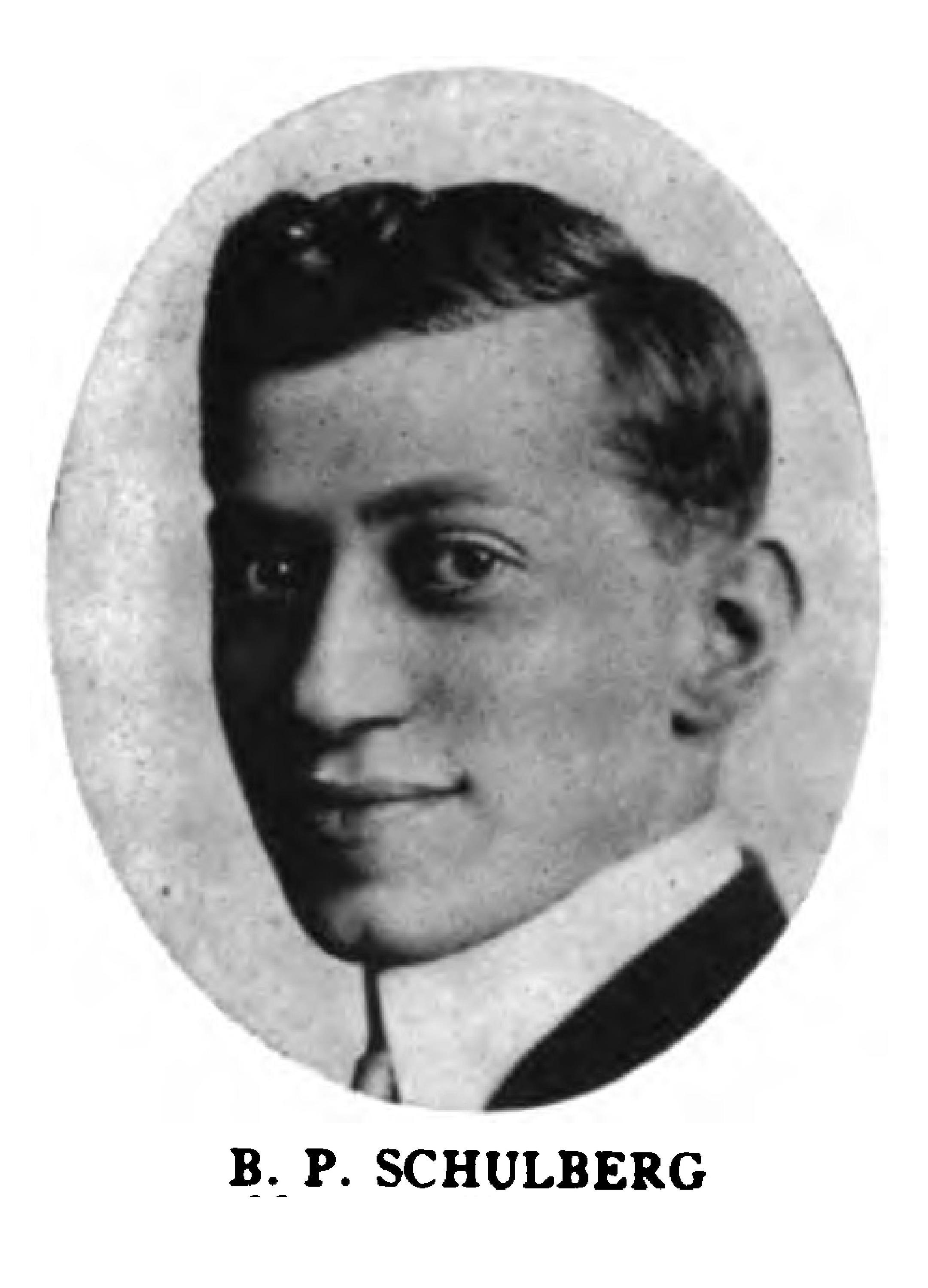
- Schulberg in 1914
- Born: Percival Schulberg; January 19, 1892; Bridgeport, Connecticut, U.S.
- Died: February 25, 1957 (aged 65); Key Biscayne, Florida, U.S.
- Other name: Benjamin Schulberg
- Occupations: Film producer, film studio executive
- Spouse: Adeline Jaffe (m. 1913; div. 1933)
- Children: 3, including Budd
- Family: Sam Jaffe (brother-in-law)

B. P. Schulberg (born Percival Schulberg, January 19, 1892 – February 25, 1957) was an American pioneer film producer and film studio executive.

== Biography ==
Born Percival Schulberg in Bridgeport, Connecticut, he took the forename Benjamin from the boy in front of him when registering for school to avoid being mocked over his true name.

Schulberg was impressed with Edwin S. Porter's films and managed to get a job with the famous director as a scenario writer. He became a publicity manager at Famous Players–Lasky, but in the power struggle around the formation of United Artists ended up on the losing side and lost his job. The public later learned that it was Schulberg's idea to bring together the "Big-4" before they were ever founded. He was one of the founding members of the Associated Motion Picture Advertisers.

In 1919, at age 27, he founded Preferred Pictures and built it around actress Katherine MacDonald. In 1923, his old school-mate and associate Jack Bachman convinced him to offer a New York starlet, 18-year-old Clara Bow, a three-month trial contract. Within days of her arrival, she was made part of the studio permanent stock.

On October 21, 1925, Schulberg's Preferred Pictures filed for bankruptcy, with debts of $820,774 and assets of just $1,420 due to his addiction to gambling. Three days later it was announced that Schulberg would join with Adolph Zukor and became associate producer of Paramount Pictures, bringing his organization, i.e. Clara Bow.

As head of production at Paramount, Schulberg produced hits starring Bow including It and Wings, which went on to win the first Academy Award for Best Picture at the first award ceremony in 1929.

Schulberg used his background in publicity to create some of the best-known phrases and slogans in film. He dubbed Mary Pickford "America's Sweetheart," and came up with the slogans "Famous Players in Famous Plays" and "If it's a Paramount Picture, it's the best show in town." During his time at Paramount, he also helped to launch the careers of Cary Grant, Ernst Lubitsch, Emil Jannings, Maurice Chevalier, Marlene Dietrich, and Shirley Temple.

In an era when the film industry was filled with conservative studio executives, Schulberg was a "New Deal" liberal, described by Moving Pictures magazine as "a political liberal in the reactionary world of Mayer and Hearst." The high-flying executive was also known as a major high-stakes poker player, especially in games regularly held at Buster Keaton's mansion, where once, in a game with fellow movie exec Joseph Schenck, Schulberg raked in $48,000.

In 1931, Paramount top-star Clara Bow left the studio, and within a year Schulberg was "squeezed out" and went back to independent film-production. In 1937, Paramount stopped distributing his films and he remained out of the business until 1940 when he began producing for Columbia Pictures. He produced six films for Columbia in three years.

In 1950, after feeling forgotten and underappreciated by Hollywood, he unsuccessfully offered his services in the film trade papers. He suffered a stroke the same year and retired permanently. Schulberg died at his home in Key Biscayne, Florida, on February 25, 1957. His son Budd stated in 1981 "I completely supported him for the last five years of his life".

For his contribution to the motion picture industry, B. P. Schulberg has a star on the Hollywood Walk of Fame at 1500 Vine Street. The Paramount studios' "Production Building" was renamed the "Schulberg Building" in his honor.

== Personal life ==
In 1913, he married Adeline Jaffe who was also Jewish. Adeline had founded a talent agency, taken over by her brother, producer/talent agent Sam Jaffe. They became the parents of renowned novelist and screenwriter, Budd Schulberg, producer Stuart Schulberg, and writer Sonya Schulberg O'Sullivan.

In 1931, Schulberg left his family to live with actress Sylvia Sidney. Schulberg and Adeline divorced in 1933.

== Partial filmography ==
- Get Your Man (1921)
- The Woman Conquers (1922)
- The Woman's Side (1922)
- Thorns and Orange Blossoms (1922)
- Heroes and Husbands (1922)
- Refuge (1923)
- April Showers (1923)
- Maytime (1923)
- Mothers-in-Law (1923)
- Are You a Failure? (1923)
- Poor Men's Wives (1923)
- Chastity (1923)
- The Scarlet Lily (1923)
- The Hero (1923)
- White Man (1924)
- The Breath of Scandal (1924)
- The Triflers (1924)
- My Lady's Lips (1925)
- The Mansion of Aching Hearts (1925)
- The Other Woman's Story (1925)
- With This Ring (1925)
- The Boomerang (1925)
- The Lawful Cheater (1925)
- Parisian Love (1925)
- Free to Love (1925)
- The Plastic Age (1925)
- Mantrap (1926)
- The Eagle of the Sea (1926)
- It (1927)
- Wedding Bills (1927)
- The Whirlwind of Youth (1927)
- Wings (1927)
- Special Delivery (1927)
- Underworld (1927)
- Swim Girl, Swim (1927)
- The Woman on Trial (1927)
- Beau Sabreur (1928)
- Red Hair (1928)
- The First Kiss (1928)
- The Love Doctor (1929)
- The Greene Murder Case (1929)
- The Virginian (1929)
- Dangerous Paradise (1930)
- Paramount on Parade (1930) co-producer
- No Limit (1931)
- Make Me a Star (1932)
- Million Dollar Legs (1932)
- Madame Butterfly (1932)
- Three-Cornered Moon (1933)
- Luxury Liner (1933)
- The Crime of the Century (1933)
- Pick-Up (1933)
- The Girl in 419 (1933)
- Jennie Gerhardt (1933)
- Her Bodyguard (1933)
- Good Dame (1934)
- Thirty Day Princess (1934)
- Little Miss Marker (1934)
- Kiss and Make-Up (1934)
- Behold My Wife! (1934)
- She Couldn't Take It (1935)
- Crime and Punishment (1935)
- Meet Nero Wolfe (1936)
- Counterfeit (1936)
- Wedding Present (1937)
- A Doctor's Diary (1937)
- The Great Gambini (1937)
- She's No Lady (1937)
- Bedtime Story (1941)
- The Adventures of Martin Eden (1942)
- The Wife Takes a Flyer (1942)
- Flight Lieutenant (1942)
- City Without Men (1943)
