= Drusilla with a Million =

1925 film

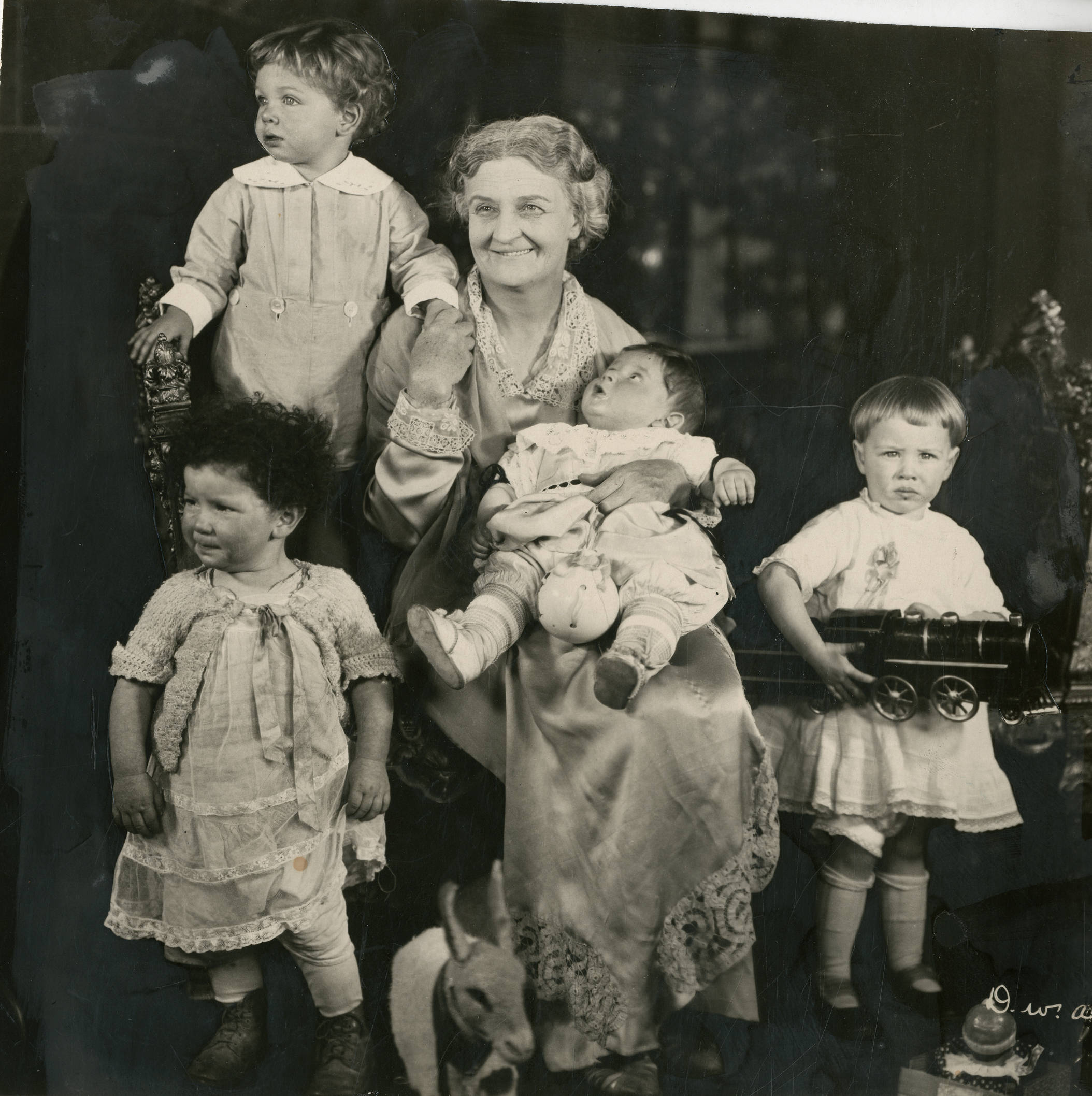
- Still with Carr
- Directed by: F. Harmon Weight
- Screenplay by: Lois Zellner
- Based on: Drusilla With a Million by Elizabeth Cooper
- Starring: Mary Carr; Priscilla Bonner; Kenneth Harlan; Henry A. Barrows; William J. Humphrey; Claire Du Brey
- Cinematography: H. Lyman Broening
- Production company: Associated Arts Corporation
- Distributed by: Film Booking Offices of America
- Release date: June 18, 1925
- Running time: 70 minutes
- Country: United States
- Language: Silent (English intertitles)

Drusilla with a Million is a 1925 American silent drama film directed by F. Harmon Weight and written by Lois Zellner. It is based on the 1916 novel Drusilla With a Million by Elizabeth Cooper. The film stars Mary Carr, Priscilla Bonner, Kenneth Harlan, Henry A. Barrows, William J. Humphrey, and Claire Du Brey. The film was released on June 18, 1925, by Film Booking Offices of America.

== Plot ==
As described in a film magazine review, Drusilla Doane, an inmate of an Old Ladies Home, when left $1,000,000 by Elias Arnold and uses the money to care for cast away children. Elias has also disinherited his son Collin. One of the babies now being cared for belongs to Sally May, the bride of Collin and a former orphanage inmate. Drusilla is brought into court because she has taken the child. Sally May is arrested for having left her husband, the reason being that his former fiancée influenced her to do so. The court rules in favor of Drusilla and Sally May, the bride and her husband are reunited.

== Cast ==
- Mary Carr as Drusilla Doane
- Priscilla Bonner as Sally May Ferris
- Kenneth Harlan as Colin Arnold
- Henry A. Barrows as Elias Arnold
- William J. Humphrey as John Thornton
- Claire Du Brey as Daphne Thornton
- Mary Louise Miller as Baby Adelmin
- Carmencita Johnson as Baby
- Dolores Corrigan as Child (uncredited)

== Preservation status ==
A print of Drusilla with a Million resides in the Lobster Film archive, Paris.
