= Priscilla Bonner =

American actress (1899–1996)

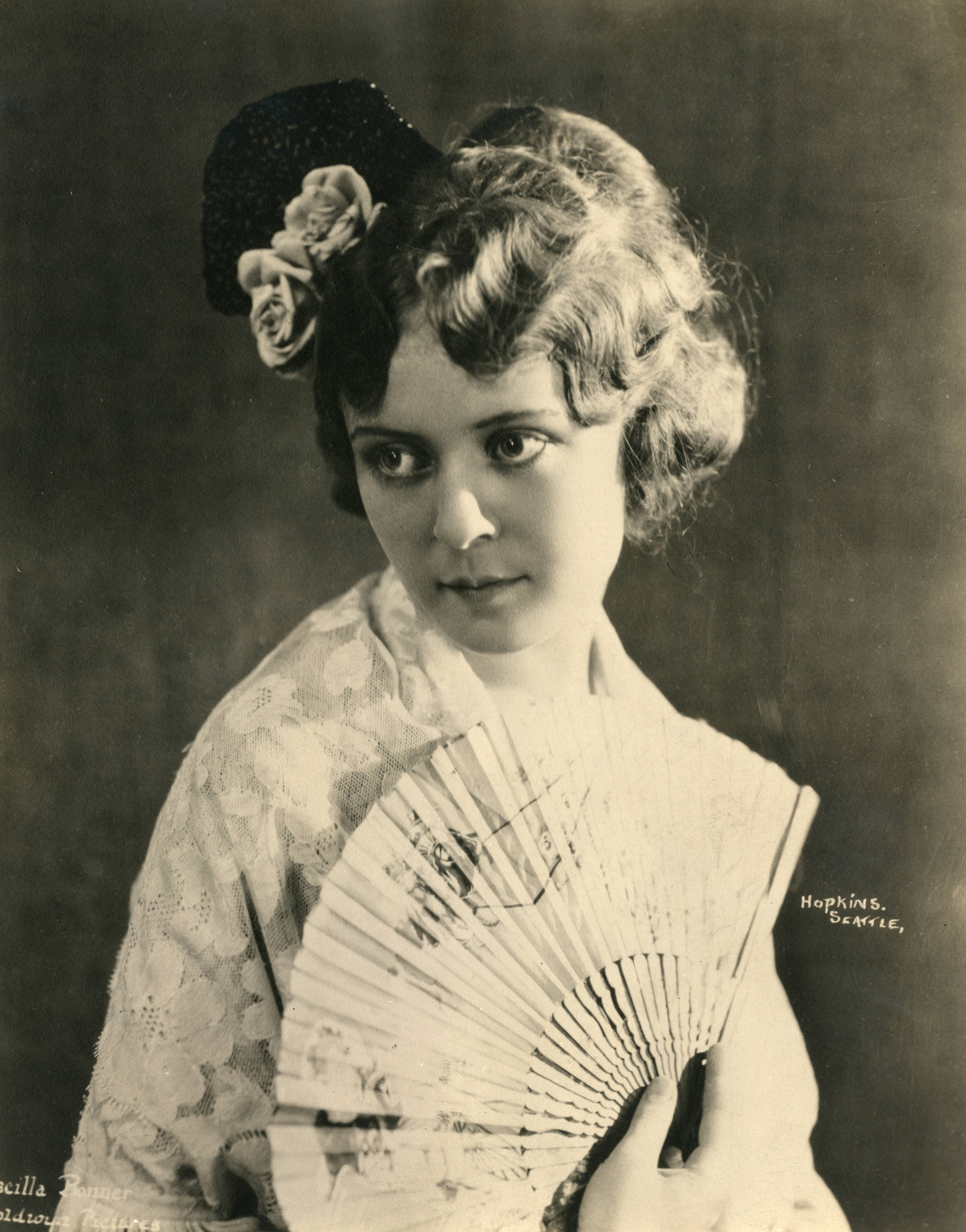
- Bonner in 1923
- Born: February 17, 1899; Washington, D.C., U.S.
- Died: February 21, 1996 (aged 97)
- Other name: Priscilla B. Woolfan
- Occupation: Actress
- Years active: 1920–1929
- Spouses: Allen Wynes Alexander (m. 1921; div. 1926) Dr. E. Bertrand Woolfan (m. 1928; died 1962)

Priscilla Bonner (February 17, 1899 – February 21, 1996) was an American silent film actress who specialized in portraying virginal, innocent heroines.

== Early years ==
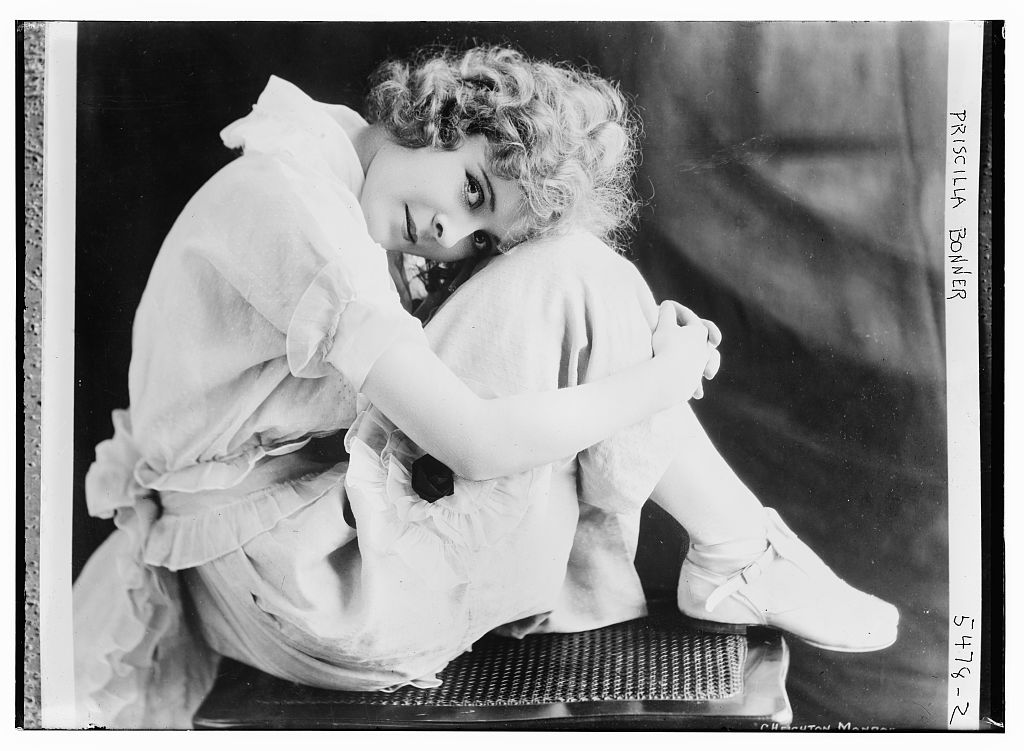
Priscilla Bonner

Priscilla Bonner was born in Washington, D.C. on February 17, 1899. Her father, John S. Bonner, worked for Page Fence and served as an officer in Company B of the local National Guard Unit. At the start of World War I the company was activated for service, and her father started his career as an Army officer. The family often moved, and she spent much of her life in different places. She often play-acted to amuse herself, playing all the parts and shifting the sets. While her father was stationed in Chicago, assigned to the staff of General Leonard Wood, she received a call from someone connected with Chicago Photoplay, insisting she come to their studio for photographs. Although she realized it was likely a wrong number, Bonner went. Intrigued by her bold initiative and photogenic charisma, the studio took portraits of her and sent them to film studios in California.

== Career ==
In 1916, when living in Adrian, Michigan, Bonner answered an open call to audition for the movie The Romance of Miss Adrian. Using her dance skills, she won a part in the picture.

In Los Angeles, she met Charles Ray, and appeared in the 1920 film Homer Comes Home, after being signed by MGM that year. She went on to co-star with Jack Pickford in The Man Who Had Everything (1920), Lon Chaney, Sr. in Shadows (1922), Colleen Moore in April Showers, and comedian Harry Langdon in The Strong Man. In 1925, she successfully sued Warner Bros. and won a substantial cash settlement when she was originally chosen and then dropped as the leading lady from John Barrymore's The Sea Beast in favor of Barrymore's new real life love interest Dolores Costello.

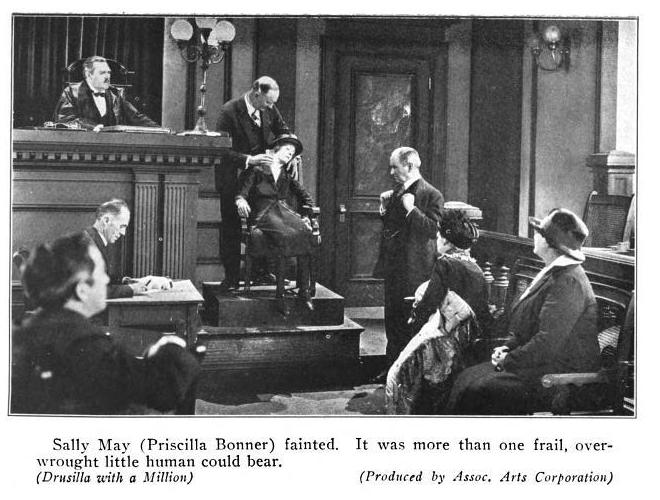
Priscilla Bonner, scene from Drusilla with a Million (1925)

That same year, she starred in the controversial independent film The Red Kimono produced and directed by Dorothy Davenport, the widow of Wallace Reid. In 1927, Bonner was loaned to Paramount Pictures to co-star in the box office hit It, starring Clara Bow.

== Personal life ==
In 1921, she married writer and author Allen Wynes Alexander. A little over a year later, he left her. She filed for divorce but later dismissed the case.

In 1928, Bonner married Dr. E. Bertrand Woolfan. She retired from film the following year. The couple were popular hosts to the burgeoning Los Angeles literary and film community, and particularly befriended Preston Sturges, the writer and director. On February 21, 1996, Bonner died at the age of 97.

Her younger sister was actress and writer Margerie Bonner.

== Filmography ==
Year	Title	Role	Notes
1920	Homer Comes Home	Rachel Prouty	
1920	Honest Hutch	Ellen	Preserved at MGM archives
1920	The Man Who Had Everything	Prue Winn	Copies are held at the George Eastman Museum and Library of Congress
1920	Officer 666	Sadie	Lost film
1921	The Son of Wallingford	Mary Curtis	Lost film
1921	Bob Hampton of Placer	Schoolteacher	Lost film
1921	Home Stuff	Susan Deep	Lost film
1922	Shadows	Mary Brent	
1923	Gallopin' Through		Lost film
1923	The Purple Dawn	Ruth Ketchell	Lost film
1923	Where's My Wandering Boy This Evening?		Lost film Short film
1923	Pitfalls of a Big City		Alternative title: The Pitfalls of a Great City; Lost film
1923	April Showers	Shannon O'Rourke	Lost film
1924	A Desperate Adventure		
1924	Hold Your Breath	The Sister	
1924	Tarnish	Aggie	Lost film
1924	Chalk Marks	Betty Towner	Lost film
1925	Charley's Aunt	Kitty	
1925	The Mansion of Aching Hearts	A City Girl	Lost film
1925	Proud Flesh	San Francisco Girl	
1925	The White Desert	Mrs. Foster	
1925	Drusilla with a Million	Sally May Ferris	
1925	Eyes of Hollywood		Lost film
1925	The Red Kimono	Gabrielle Darley	
1926	The Earth Woman	Sally	
1926	3 Bad Men	Millie Stanley	
1926	The Strong Man	Mary Brown	
1926	The False Alarm	Bessie Flannigan	Lost film
1927	It	Molly	
1927	Long Pants	His Bride (Priscilla)	
1927	Paying the Price		
1927	The Prince of Headwaiters	Faith Cable	Lost film
1927	Broadway After Midnight	Queenie Morgan/Gloria Livingston	Alternative title: Gangsters on Broadway; Lost film
1928	Outcast Souls	Alice Davis	Lost film
1928	Golden Shackles	Lucy Weston	
1929	Girls Who Dare	Sally Casey	Lost film
