= The Mansion of Aching Hearts =

1925 film

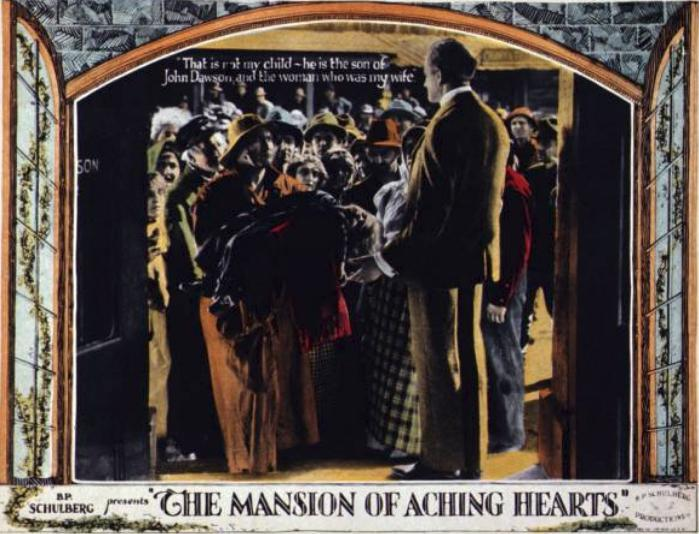
- Lobby card
- Directed by: James P. Hogan
- Written by: Frederick Stowers
- Produced by: B. P. Schulberg
- Starring: Ethel Clayton; Barbara Bedford; Priscilla Bonner
- Cinematography: Harry Perry
- Production company: B.P. Schulberg Productions
- Distributed by: Preferred Pictures
- Release date: February 27, 1925
- Running time: 60 minutes
- Country: United States
- Language: Silent (English intertitles)

The Mansion of Aching Hearts is a lost 1925 American silent drama film directed by James P. Hogan and starring Ethel Clayton, Barbara Bedford, and Priscilla Bonner.

== Plot ==
As described in a film magazine review, believing his wife is unfaithful, Martin Craig sends his with Pauline and their child away. The mother loses the child while on a boat, after which the father locates it and rears it as a stranger without a last name, to be called Bill Smith. The mother, believing the child has drowned, goes to a home for friendless pregnant young women and becomes its matron. Later, she returns to the home of her son only to find that he has been taught to promise vengeance upon her for bringing him into the world nameless. A mob forms intending to chase her from the town. However, she meets Martin and forces him to publicly admit the truth that she is innocent, whereupon she and the son are admitted to respectability. A reunion between the three follows.

== Cast ==
- Ethel Clayton as Pauline Craig
- Barbara Bedford as Martha
- Priscilla Bonner as A City Girl
- Philo McCullough as John Dawson
- Edward Delaney as A City Boy
- Cullen Landis as Bill Smith
- Sam De Grasse as Martin Craig
- Eddie Phillips as A 'Sheik'
- Eddie Gribbon as Fritz Dahlgren
- Helen Hoge as Bill, as a child

== Preservation ==
The film is currently lost.

== Bibliography ==
- Goble, Alan. The Complete Index to Literary Sources in Film. Walter de Gruyter, 1999.
