= Harry Perry (cinematographer) =

American cinematographer

- Born: May 2, 1888
- Died: February 9, 1985 (aged 96); Woodland Hills, Los Angeles, California, USA
- Occupation: Cinematographer
- Years active: 1920–1948
- Spouse: Fern Strange Perry
- Relatives: Paul Perry (brother)

Harry Perry (May 2, 1888 – February 9, 1985) was an American cinematographer who was nominated for an Academy Award at the 3rd Academy Awards for Best Cinematography for the film Hell's Angels along with Tony Gaudio. He lived to be 96 years old.

== Partial filmography ==
- The Sins of Rosanne (1920)
- The Easy Road (1921)
- The Faith Healer (1921)
- The City of Silent Men (1921)
- White and Unmarried (1921)
- The Conquest of Canaan (1921)
- Cappy Ricks (1921)
- A Prince There Was (1921)
- The Crimson Challenge (1922)
- The Ordeal (1922)
- If You Believe It, It's So (1922)
- Borderland (1922)
- Shadows (1922)
- Are You a Failure? (1923)
- The Girl Who Came Back (1923)
- April Showers (1923)
- The Breath of Scandal (1924)
- The Vanishing American (1925)
- The Mansion of Aching Hearts (1925)
- Flattery (1925)
- Go Straight (1925)
- Wings (1927)
- Now We're in the Air (1927)
- Hell's Angels (1930)
- Corvette K-225 (1943)
