= April Showers (1923 film) =

1923 film by Tom Forman

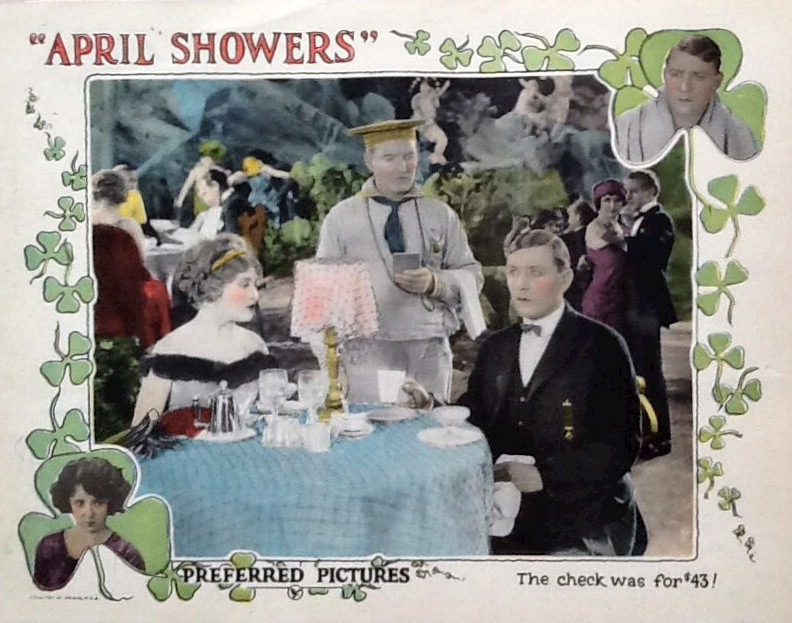
- Lobby card
- Directed by: Tom Forman
- Written by: Louis D. Lighton
- Produced by: B.P. Schulberg
- Starring: Colleen Moore; Kenneth Harlan; Ruth Clifford; Priscilla Bonner
- Cinematography: Harry Perry
- Production company: B.P. Schulberg Productions
- Distributed by: Preferred Pictures
- Release date: December 10, 1923
- Country: United States
- Language: Silent (English intertitles)

April Showers is a 1923 American silent romantic film directed by Tom Forman starring Colleen Moore. It is not known whether the film currently survives.

== Plot ==
Danny O'Rourke is the son of a police officer who was killed in the line of duty. Eager to join the police force, Danny fails his exams. The failure causes him to neglect his sweetheart Maggie, whose father is a police lieutenant. His attentions turn instead towards society girl Miriam Welton. When Danny’s sister, Shannon, is arrested for shoplifting, Danny turns to boxing to save her. He works his way towards the championship but discovers the final bought has been rigged. Danny fights anyhow and he is beaten, but it is discovered that a mistake had been made on his exams and he actually was eligible to join the police force after all.

== Cast ==
- Colleen Moore as Maggie Muldoon
- Kenneth Harlan as Danny O'Rourke
- Ruth Clifford as Miriam Welton
- Priscilla Bonner as Shannon O'Rourke
- Myrtle Vane as Mrs. O'Rourke
- James Corrigan as Matt Gallagher
- Jack Byron as Flash Irwin
- Ralph Faulkner as Champ Sullivan
- Tom McGuire as Lieutenant Muldoon
- Norman Selby as Ring Manager (as Kid McCoy)
- Danny Goodman as Ring Manager

== Background ==
Filmed in early [1923], April Showers would bring Colleen to the Mayer-Schulberg Studio (formerly the Selig studio). April Showers followed The Nth Commandment, and it was an old-fashioned romantic story billed as having “…the ‘all-Irish-all-star’ cast. The January 23 Los Angeles Times ran a story entitled “She Couldn't Keep Down Her Irish Blood,” which concerned the making of April Showers and managed to tap into the "Irish" persona she had cultivated:

“The piquant Colleen plays the role of a rather tomboyish little Irish girl of plain but honest parents.... Miss Moore lives her parts at home as well as before the camera and in practicing before her grandmother, Mm. Mary Kelly, she finally drew fire from that saint of the household.
“’Colleen me child,’ said Grandmother Kelly, ‘It's all very well to act like a little hoyden and be rough and tomboyish—but there’s too much of that sort on the screen, me dear. Remember, not all the Irish men are policemen and not all the Irish women are washwomen.... You don’t have to be any wilder because you’re supposed to be Irish.’
“’All right, grandmother,’ humbly agreed Colleen, ‘but it’s hard for me not to let myself go—being Irish.’"

Actor Harlan trained with real boxers to prepare for the role. shortly after this film was finished, Colleen would go to work for Associated First National where, with the success of the film Flaming Youth, she would achieve a new level of fame.

== Censorship ==
Before April Showers could be exhibited in Kansas, the Kansas Board of Review required the removal of a scene where Mrs. O'Rourke embraces a black person during a fight.
