= The Woman Thou Gavest Me =

The Woman Thou Gavest Me may refer to:

- The Woman Thou Gavest Me (novel), a 1913 novel by Hall Caine
- The Woman Thou Gavest Me (film), a 1919 silent film based on the novel
