= Violet Clark =

American screenwriter

- Born: Anna Violet Clark; May 13, 1896; Omaha, Nebraska, USA
- Died: October 23, 1974 (aged 78); Los Angeles, California, USA
- Occupation: Screenwriter

Anna Violet Clark (1896-1974) was an American screenwriter active during Hollywood's silent era.

== Biography ==
The youngest of four children born to A.W. Clark and Anna Taggert in Omaha, Nebraska, Violet attended Mills College in Oakland, California, and then graduated from the University of Chicago. She started off her professional career as a journalist at newspapers in the Midwest.

She soon began writing scenarios; the first one she sold was for 1919's Bonnie, Bonnie Lassie, directed by Tod Browning. In 1920, Clark came to Los Angeles to accept a position as a scenario writer for Thomas H. Ince. She'd also write a number of stories for actress Katherine McDonald and B. P. Shulberg at First National, as well as Samuel Goldwyn.

She married Los Angeles–based commercial artist Robert Freeman in 1922, and the pair spent a year in London, during which she wrote pictures for British studios. After the birth of their two sons, the pair spent four years in Europe, at which point Violet returned to her position at Paramount, but she's not credited with any other films after this period.

== Selected filmography ==
- The Girl from Gay Paree (1927)
- The Splendid Crime (1925)
- Not So Long Ago (1925)
- Grounds for Divorce (1925)
- A Self-Made Failure (1924)
- Slander the Woman (1923)
- Bell Boy 13 (1923)
- The Woman Conquers (1922)
- Domestic Relations (1922)
- The Foolish Age (1921)
- The Truth About Husbands (1921)
- The Devil's Garden (1920)
- Wings of Pride (1920)
- Madonnas and Men (1920)
- A Woman's Business (1920)
- Locked Lips (1920)
- Love Without Question (1920)
- The Red Lane (1919)
- The Pointing Finger (1919)
- Loot (1919)
- Bonnie, Bonnie Lassie (1919)
