= The Cost of Hatred =

1917 film by George Melford

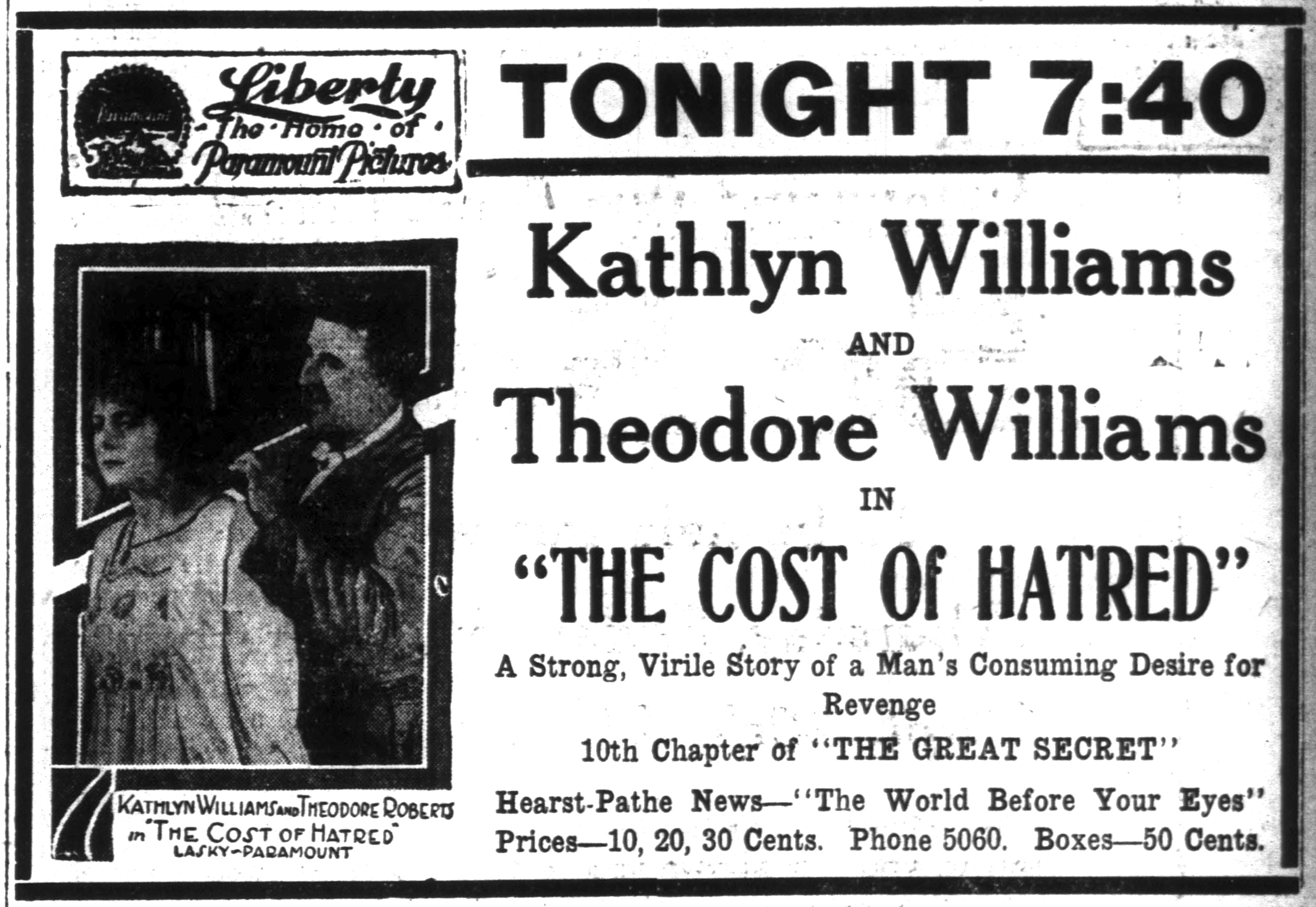
- Newspaper advertisement
- Directed by: George Melford
- Screenplay by: Beulah Marie Dix
- Produced by: Jesse L. Lasky
- Starring: Kathlyn Williams; Theodore Roberts; Tom Forman; Jack W. Johnston; Jack Holt; Charles Ogle
- Cinematography: Percy Hilburn (French)
- Production company: Jesse L. Lasky Feature Play Company
- Distributed by: Paramount Pictures
- Release date: April 9, 1917
- Running time: 50 minutes
- Country: United States
- Language: English

The Cost of Hatred is a 1917 American drama silent film directed by George Melford and written by Beulah Marie Dix. The film stars Kathlyn Williams, Theodore Roberts, Tom Forman, Jack W. Johnston, Jack Holt and Charles Ogle. The film was released on April 9, 1917, by Paramount Pictures.

== Plot ==
Advertised as a story about a man's consuming desire for revenge.

== Cast ==
- Kathlyn Williams as Elsie Graves / Sarita Graves
- Theodore Roberts as Justus Graves
- Tom Forman as Ned Amory
- Jack W. Johnston as Robert Amory (*aka J. W. Johnston)
- Jack Holt as Huertez
- Charles Ogle as McCabe (*Charles Stanton Ogle)
- Walter Long as Jefe Politico
- Horace B. Carpenter as Ramon
- Mayme Kelso as Elsie's Companion
- Louise Mineugh as Little Sarita
- Lucien Littlefield
- Lillian Rosine
