= Headin' South =

1918 film

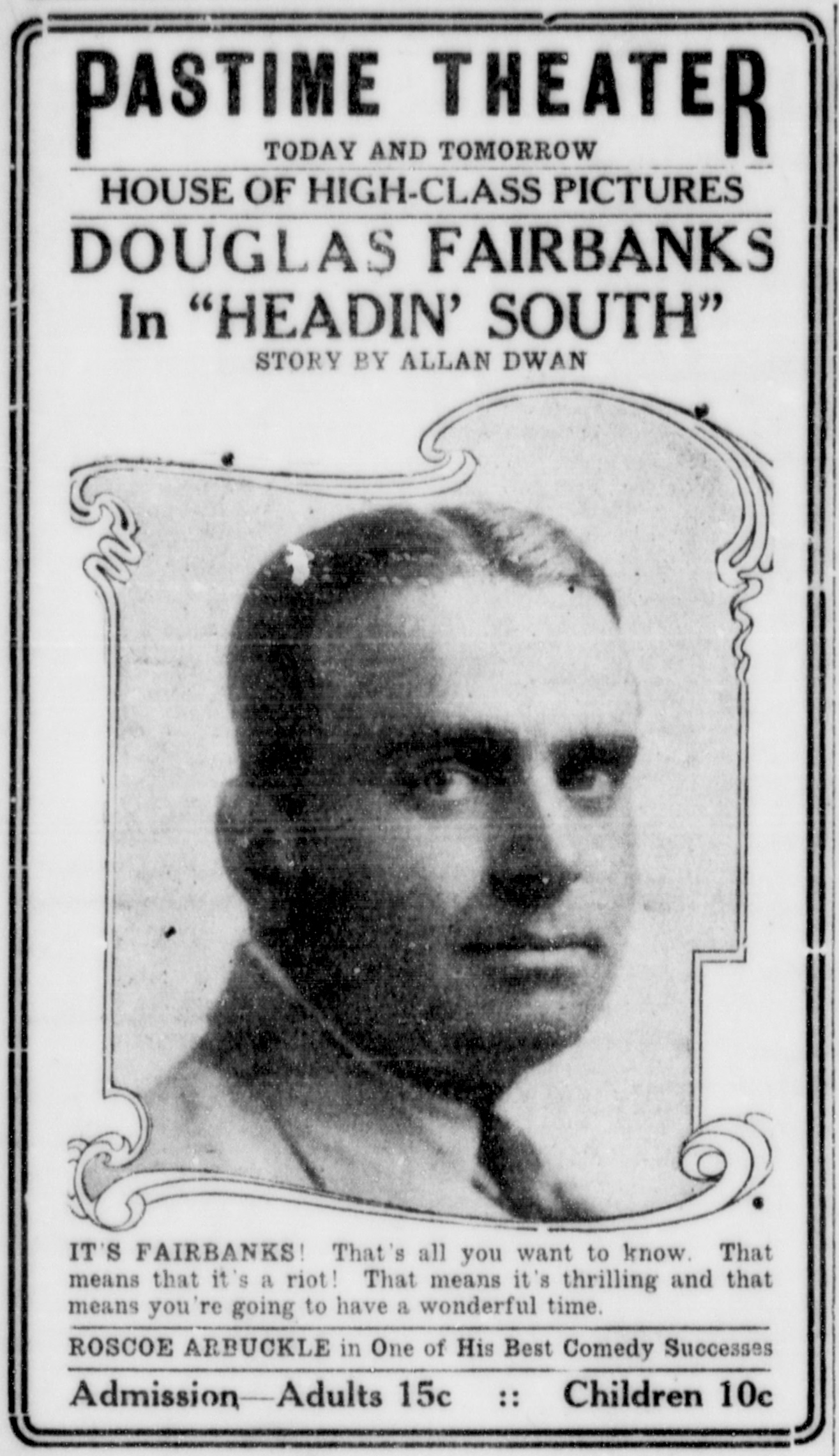
- Directed by: Allan Dwan; Arthur Rosson
- Written by: Allan Dwan
- Produced by: Douglas Fairbanks
- Starring: Douglas Fairbanks
- Cinematography: Connie De Roo; Glen MacWilliams; Hugh McClung; Len Powers; Harris Thorpe; Charles Warrington
- Production company: Famous Players–Lasky/Artcraft
- Distributed by: Paramount Pictures
- Release date: February 25, 1918
- Running time: 50 minutes
- Country: United States
- Language: Silent (English intertitles)

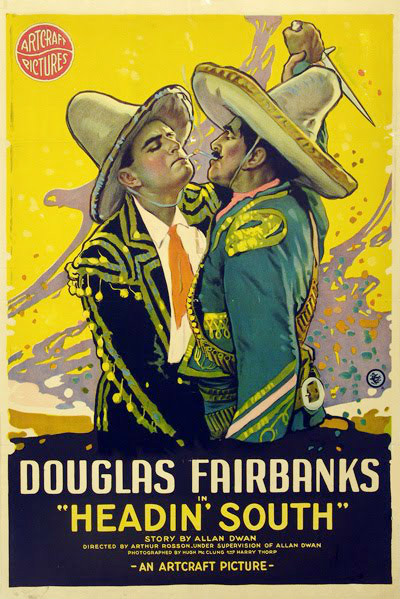
Existing film poster.

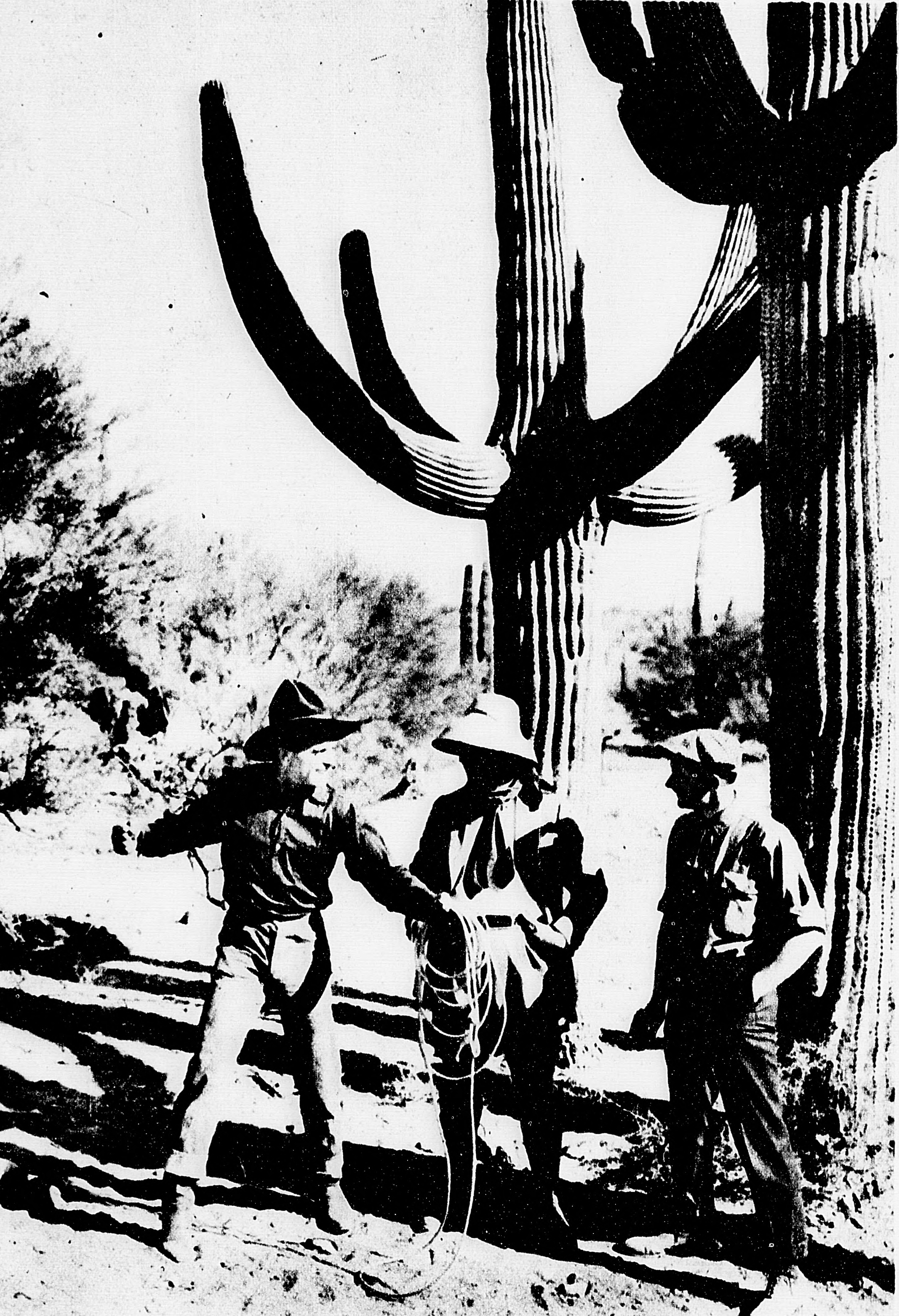
Douglas Fairbanks discussing a scene on location near the Mexican border with the directors.

Headin' South is a 1918 American silent romantic comedy film directed by Arthur Rosson with supervision from Allan Dwan and starring Douglas Fairbanks. The film is now considered to be lost.

== Plot ==
As described in a film magazine, a forest ranger known only as Headin' South goes forth in search of Spanish Joe, a Mexican responsible for most of the treachery and outlawry along the U.S.-Mexican border. Headin' South gains quite a reputation as he goes along and finally believes himself worthy of joining Joe's band. in a whirlwind finish in which Joe is captured, Headin' South meets one of Joe's near victims and falls in love with her.

== Cast ==
- Douglas Fairbanks as "Headin' South"
- Frank Campeau as Joe "Spanish Joe"
- Katherine MacDonald as The Girl
- James Mason as His Aide
- Johnny Judd
- Tom Grimes
- Art Acord
- Hoot Gibson
- Edward Burns (credited as Ed Burns)
- Jack Holt
- Marjorie Daw

== Reception ==
Like many American films of the time, Headin' South was subject to cuts by city and state film censorship boards. For example, the Chicago Board of Censors, in Reel 1, cut two scenes of shooting and men falling, shooting homesteader and his falling at wagon, ten scenes of shooting at town, man at stairway being shot and falling dead, Reel 2, view of coin, Reel 4, the four intertitles "I've a scheme to get them away from the women, that leaves the choice to us", "There are fifteen women and a hundred men—how can we divide them?", "Let's have a race around the cactus, the first fifteen back will have the pick", and "We'll have the first pick while their gone", two scenes of Mexicans shooting up town, Reel 5, fifteen shooting scenes in which men fall, two intertitles "Where are the women" and "In the church", and all scenes of dead men and horses.

== See also ==
- Hoot Gibson filmography
- The House That Shadows Built (1931) promotional film by Paramount with excerpt of Headin' South
- List of lost films
