= White Shoulders (1922 film) =

1922 film by Tom Forman

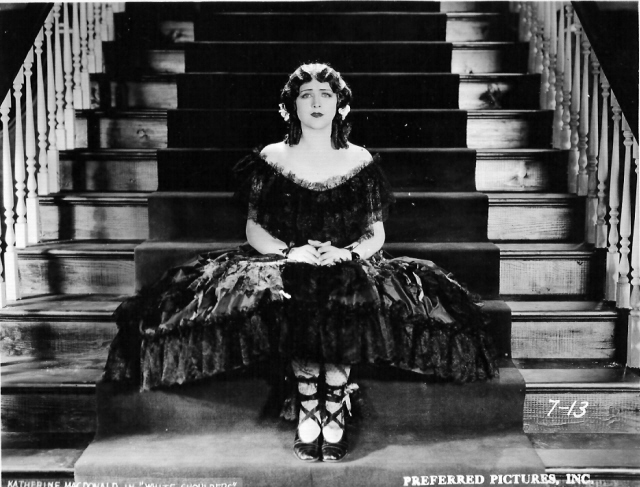
- Still with Katherine MacDonald
- Directed by: Tom Forman
- Written by: George Kibbe Turner (story); Lois Zellner (adaptation)
- Produced by: B. P. Schulberg; Preferred Pictures
- Starring: Katherine MacDonald
- Cinematography: Joseph Brotherton
- Production company: Preferred Pictures
- Distributed by: Associated First National
- Release date: October 1922
- Running time: 6 reels
- Country: United States
- Language: Silent (English intertitles)

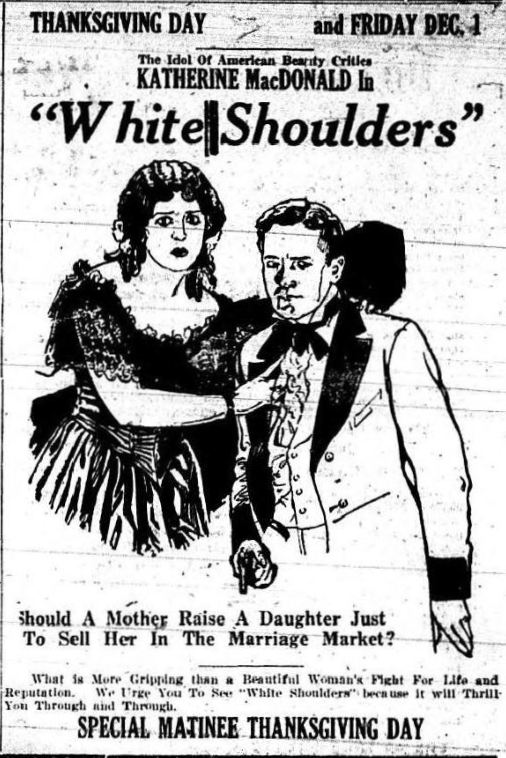
Advertisement

White Shoulders is a lost 1922 American silent drama film starring Katherine MacDonald that was directed by Tom Forman. It was produced by B. P. Schulberg and released through Associated First National, later First National Pictures.

== Cast ==
- Katherine MacDonald - Virginia Pitman
- Lillian Lawrence - Mrs. Pitman, Virginia's Mother
- Tom Forman - Robert Lee Pitman - Virginia's Brother
- Bryant Washburn - Cole Hawkins
- Nigel Barrie - Clayborne Gordon
- Charles K. French - Colonel Jim Singleton
- James O. Barrows - Judge Blakelock
- Richard Headrick - Little Jimmie Blakelock
- Fred Malatesta - Maurice, A Modiste
- Lincoln Stedman - Cupid Calvert
- William De Vaull - Uncle Enoch

== Production ==
Scenes were filmed at the Hotel Del Monte in Monterey, California.
