= Bonnie, Bonnie Lassie =

1919 film

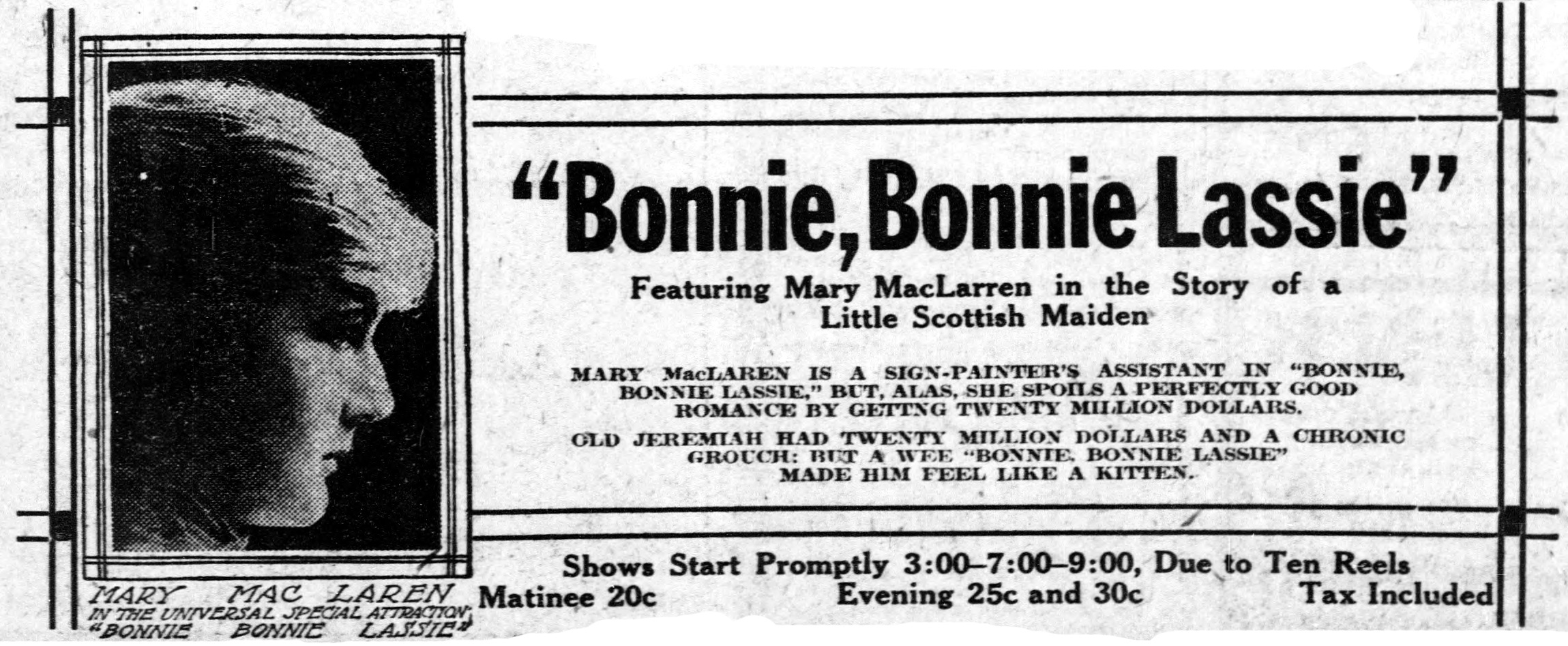
- Newspaper advertisement
- Directed by: Tod Browning
- Written by: Tod Browning; Violet Clark; Henry C. Rowland; Waldemar Young
- Starring: Mary MacLaren; Spottiswoode Aitken
- Cinematography: William Fildew
- Distributed by: Universal Film Manufacturing Company
- Release date: October 5, 1919
- Running time: 6 reels
- Country: United States
- Language: Silent with English intertitles

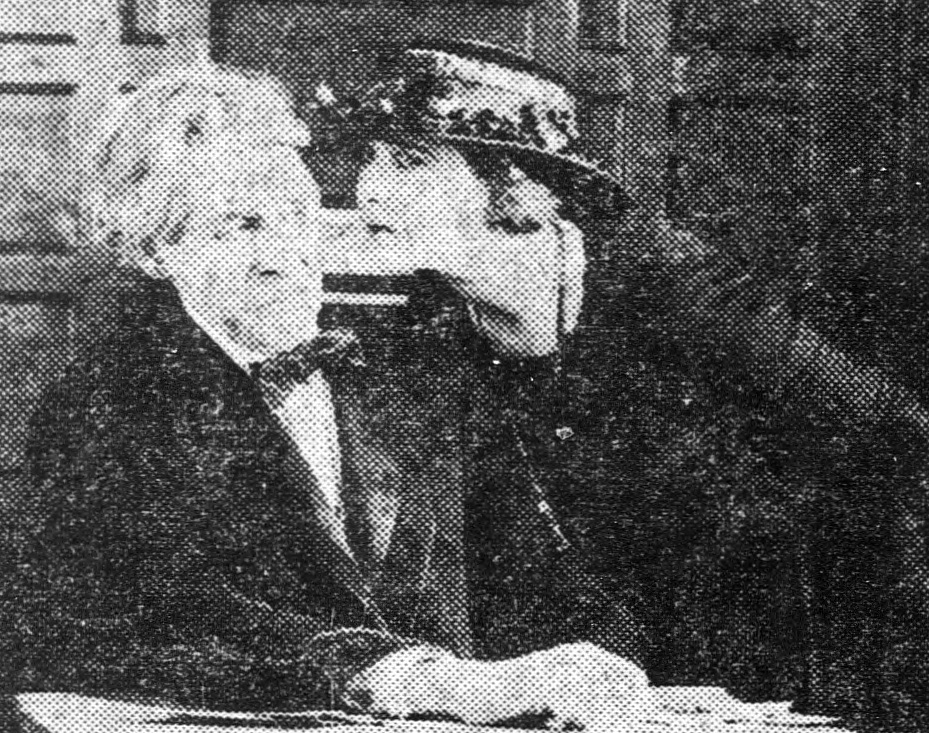
Scene from the film

Bonnie, Bonnie Lassie is a lost 1919 American comedy film directed by Tod Browning.

== Cast ==
- Mary MacLaren as Alisa Graeme
- Spottiswoode Aitken as Jeremiah Wishart
- David Butler - David
- Arthur Edmund Carewe as Archibald Loveday (as Arthur Carewe)
- F. A. Turner (as Fred Turner)
- Clarissa Selwynne (as Clarissa Selwyn)
- Eugenie Forde
