= The Lonely Road (film) =

1923 film by Victor Schertzinger

- Directed by: Victor Schertzinger
- Written by: Lois Zellner; Charles Logue
- Produced by: B. P. Schulberg
- Starring: Katherine MacDonald
- Cinematography: Joseph Brotherton
- Edited by: Eve Unsell
- Production company: Preferred Pictures
- Distributed by: Associated First National (*later First National Pictures)
- Release date: May 7, 1923
- Running time: 6 reels
- Country: USA
- Language: Silent...English titles

The Lonely Road is a lost 1923 silent film drama directed by Victor Schertzinger and starring Katherine MacDonald. It was produced by B. P. Schulberg and released through Associated First National.

== Cast ==
- Katherine MacDonald – Betty Austin
- Orville Caldwell – Warren Wade
- Kathleen Kirkham – Leila Mead
- Eugenie Besserer – Martha True
- William Conklin – Dr. Devereaux
- James Neill – Uncle Billy Austin
- Frank Leigh – Stewart Bartley
- Charles K. French – Hiram Wade
- Stanley Goethals – The Wade's Son
