= Shadows (1922 film) =

1922 film

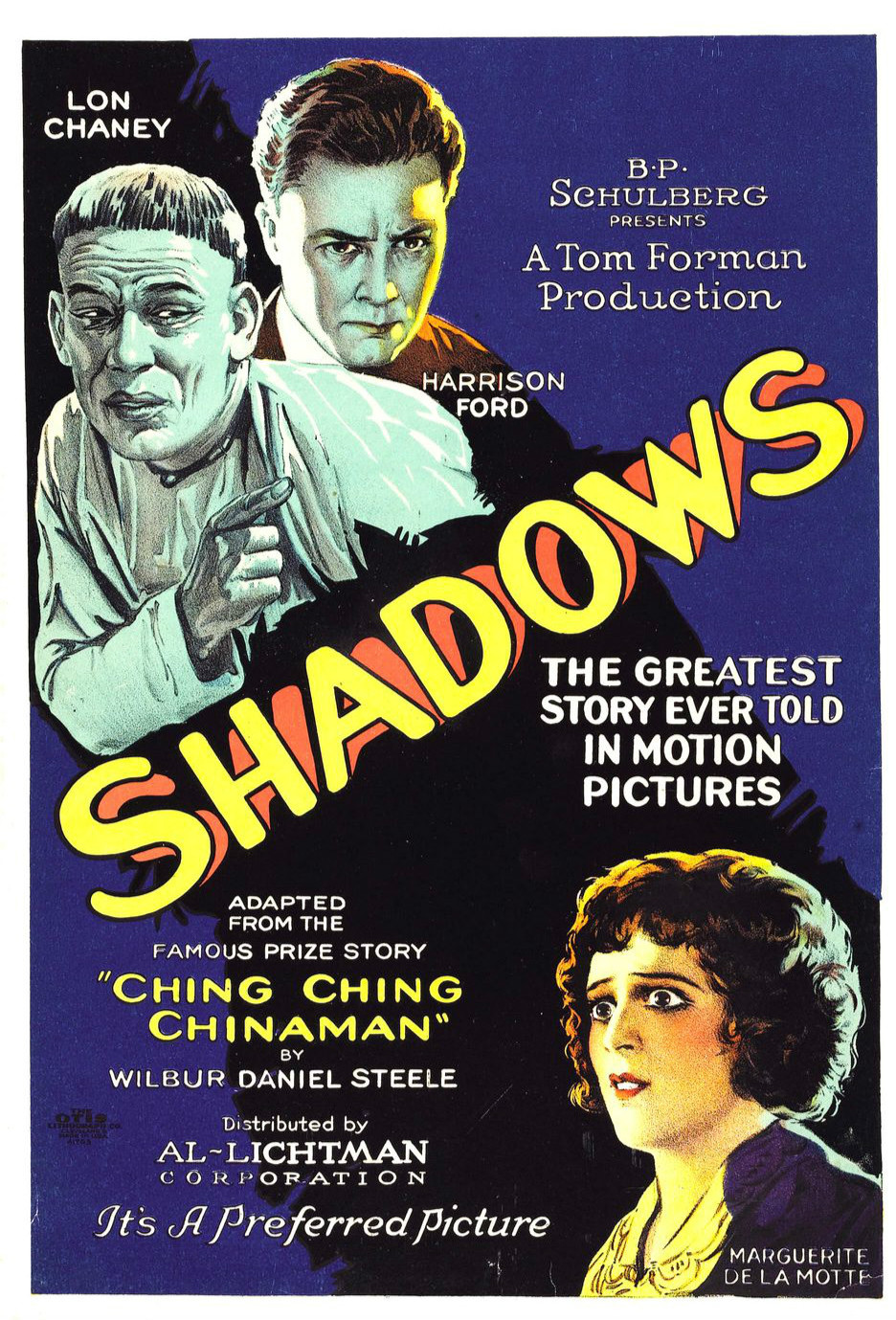
- Directed by: Tom Forman
- Written by: Eve Unsell; Hope Loring; Wilbur Daniel Steele (short story)
- Produced by: B. P. Schulberg
- Starring: Lon Chaney; Marguerite De La Motte; Harrison Ford; John St. Polis
- Cinematography: Harry Perry
- Music by: Louis Gottschalk
- Distributed by: Preferred Pictures
- Release date: November 10, 1922
- Running time: 70 minutes
- Country: United States
- Languages: Silent; English intertitles

Shadows feature film.

Shadows is a dramatic 1922 silent film starring Lon Chaney, Marguerite De La Motte, Harrison Ford and John Sainpolis. Shadows is a tale of a gentle Chinese immigrant trying to make a life for himself in a small New England town who comes across a vile plot to blackmail two good townspeople. It was directed by Tom Forman. The screenplay was written by Eve Unsell and Hope Loring, based on Ching, Ching, Chinaman, a short story by Wilbur Daniel Steele. The photography was by Harry Perry, and Louis Gottschalk supplied the music score, for which Eve Unsell also wrote the lyrics. The following year, as Chaney was preparing to star in The Hunchback of Notre Dame, he suggested Marguerite De La Motte for the role of Esmeralda, but the part went to Patsy Ruth Miller instead.

Some scenes were shot on location in Balboa, Newport Beach and Del Monte, California, and the interior scenes were shot at the Louis B. Mayer Studios. A still exists showing Chaney in his Yen Sin makeup. Two lobby cards from the film can also be seen here. Prints of the film were sold on the collectors' market for many years by Blackhawk Films. There are a number of existing prints in various collections, and the film is readily available on DVD.

== Plot ==
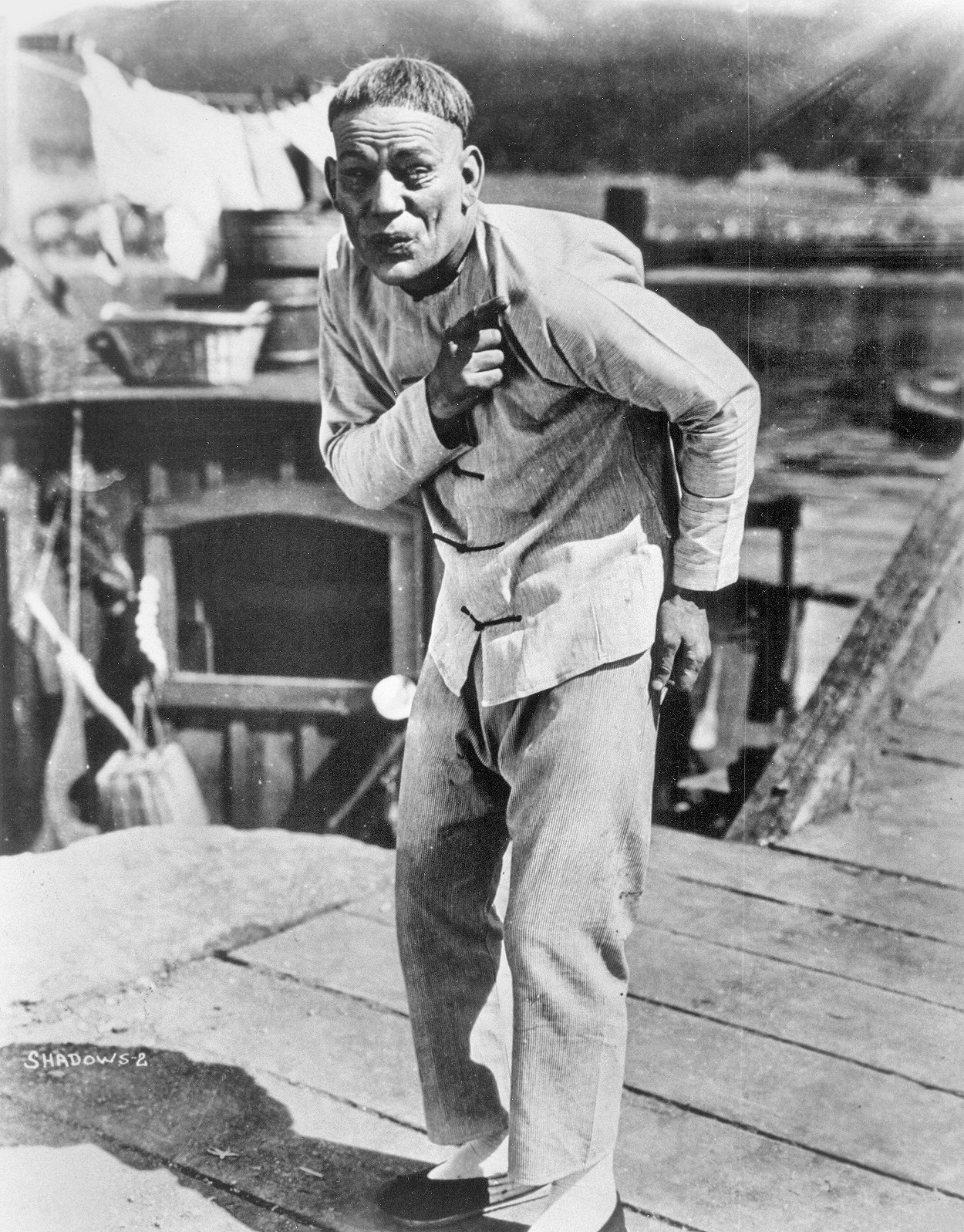
Lon Chaney as Chinese immigrant, Yen Sin.

A physically abusive fisherman by the name of Daniel Gibbs leaves his wife Sympathy Gibbs to go on a fishing expedition with other villagers from their village of Urkey and the ship is lost in a storm. Only two men survive, one villager and a mysterious old hunchbacked Chinese stranger named Yen Sin. Being Chinese and refusing to take part in a Christian service held on the beach for those lost, he is treated like an outcast and forced to live on a small houseboat moored in the harbor. He makes his living doing laundry from his boat, and is soon greeted by the new minister, John Malden, who tries unsuccessfully to convert him. Love blossoms between the Reverend Malden and Sympathy, and they are soon married, to the chagrin of the town's wealthy banker, Nate Snow. Sympathy soon befriends Yen Sin after she defends him against several white kids taunting him in the street. (Yen Sin later befriends one of the kids who had taunted him, whom he calls "Mr. Bad Boy", by giving the boy candy.)

Snow concocts a blackmail scheme, writing an anonymous letter to the married couple, claiming to be Sympathy's lost husband Daniel and demanding payment to keep quiet. Malden receives the letter just before going on a trip with Snow (not knowing Snow wrote the letter), and leaves the now pregnant Sympathy at home. Yen Sin tells Malden to be sure and get his laundry done while he's away on the trip by using his Asian friend in that other city named Sam Low, who is planning to act as an informant for Yen Sin. While he is away, their baby is born, and Malden now decides to pay the blackmail money in order to avoid a horrible scandal.

Malden, upon his return, is so distraught that he resigns from the ministry, and asks Snow if he can borrow money from him to pay off Daniel Gibbs. Snow does not get to enjoy the benefits of his deception however, as Yen Sin exposes the blackmail plot in order to vindicate the young couple, revealing everything he knows from his deathbed. Malden forgives Snow for all the trouble he caused him and his wife, and when Yen Sin witnesses this act of forgiveness, he agrees to convert to Christianity. He sails off in his houseboat at the end, disappearing into the sunset, wishing to die at sea. Before he leaves, he bids farewell to his young friend Mr. Bad Boy, who cries as he watches Yen Sin sail away.

== Cast ==
- Lon Chaney as Yen Sin
- Marguerite De La Motte as Sympathy Gibbs
- Harrison Ford as John Malden
- John St. Polis as Nate Snow (credited as John Sainpolis)
- Walter Long as Daniel Gibbs
- Buddy Messinger as "Mr. Bad Boy"
- Priscilla Bonner as Mary Brent
- Frances Raymond as Emsy Nickerson
- Joe Murphy as Townsman
- Billie Latimer as Tall Woman

== Reception ==
After the film, the reviews were very positive towards Lon Chaney as Yen Sin. Harrison's Reports said that "through tragedy, the sad fate of the principal characters does not leave an unpleasant feeling. On the contrary, their fate so arouses the compassion of the spectator that he feels regret for not being able to help relieve their sufferings. The acting of Mr. Chaney, who assumes the role of a Chinaman, is remarkable. Better acting he has never done in his life. Every one of the other players, too, acts well."

"Lon Chaney as 'the Heathen' assumes a role that tempts overacting; but he subdues this temptation to the extent that this Chinaman grips you with a human chain that is unbreakable. This role clinches the claim of friends of Chaney that he is the greatest character man on the screen, for his is as fine an example of realistic acting and makeup as this writer has seen reflected on the silver sheet." ---Moving Picture World

"A decidedly grim and morbid tale, directed and presented without any lighter relieving moments...Lon Chaney as the Chinaman gave a corking performance and successfully withstood the strain of dying through about 2,000 feet of film." ---Variety

"It is excellently done in the main and tells a powerful story of how a Chinaman in his bland, naive, simple way proves a better Christian than either the minister of the gospel or the deacon of the church...Lon Chaney gives probably the most superior performance of his long and important career." -Film Daily

"Now and then a picture is produced that stands out above others. Such a one is Shadows, a picture that stands out above others. The acting of Mr. Chaney who assumes the role of the Chinaman is remarkable. Better acting he has never done in his life." ---Harrison's Reports

Exhibitors Trade Review called Chaney's role in this film "one of unusual difficulty".

Photoplay said "The central figure, the Oriental laundry man remarkably acted by Lon Chaney, is a fine and true conception."

Film critic Robert Sherwood chose Shadows as one of the best films of the year, and it was voted on the year's Top Forty Pictures by the National Board of Reviews.
