= Domestic Relations (film) =

1922 film by Chester Withey

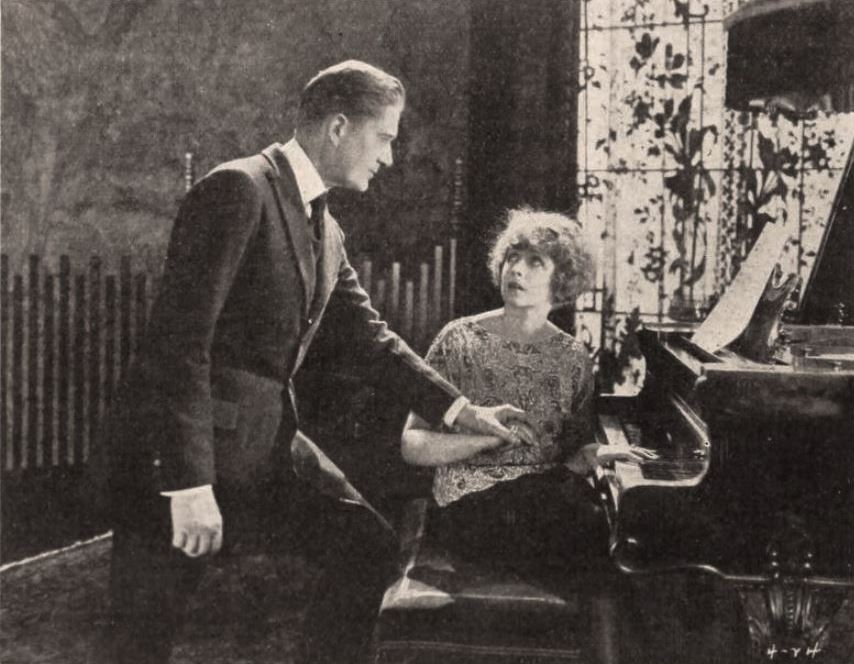
- Film still with William P. Carleton and Katherine MacDonald
- Directed by: Chester Withey
- Screenplay by: Violet Clark
- Starring: Katherine MacDonald; William P. Carleton; Frank Leigh; Barbara La Marr; Gordon Mullen; George Fisher
- Cinematography: Joseph Brotherton
- Production company: Preferred Pictures
- Distributed by: Associated First National Pictures
- Release date: June 4, 1922
- Running time: 60 minutes
- Country: United States
- Language: Silent (English intertitles)

Domestic Relations is a lost 1922 American drama film directed by Chester Withey and written by Violet Clark. The film stars Katherine MacDonald, William P. Carleton, Frank Leigh, Barbara La Marr, Gordon Mullen, and George Fisher. The film was released on June 4, 1922, by Associated First National Pictures.

== Cast ==
- Katherine MacDonald as Barbara Benton
- William P. Carleton as Judge James Benton
- Frank Leigh as Joe Martin
- Barbara La Marr as Mrs. Martin
- Gordon Mullen as Sandy
- George Fisher as Pierre
- Lloyd Whitlock as Dr. Chester Brooks
