= The Woman Conquers =

1922 film

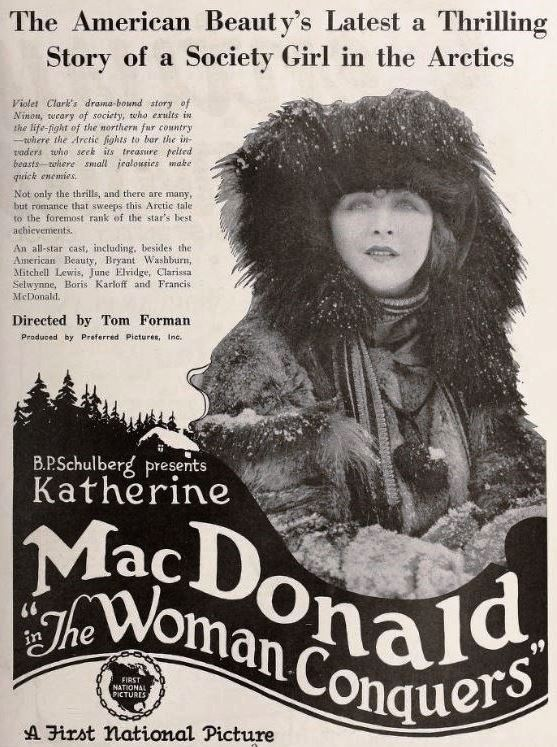
- Trade advertisement
- Directed by: Tom Forman
- Story by: Violet Clark
- Produced by: B. P. Schulberg
- Starring: Katherine MacDonald; Bryant Washburn; Mitchell Lewis; Boris Karloff
- Cinematography: Joseph Brotherton
- Production company: Preferred Pictures
- Distributed by: Associated First National Pictures
- Release date: December 1922
- Running time: 6 reels (one hour)
- Country: United States
- Language: Silent (English intertitles)

The Woman Conquers is a 1922 American silent drama film written by Violet Clark and directed by Tom Forman. It stars Katherine MacDonald and Bryant Washburn and featured a young Boris Karloff. The film is considered lost.

== Plot ==
Young society beauty Ninon Le Compte deplores the lack of energy and physical fiber among the men of her acquaintance, including Frederick Van Court, who regularly proposes marriage to her. Her uncle's death leaves Ninon the owner of a fur trading settlement in the Hudson Bay country. She decides to go there and is accompanied by her friend Flora O'Hare and Frederick.

Arriving at the post, she finds Lazar, the Canadian in charge, is a dangerous man who covets the estate and also evinces a desire to possess her. Ninon also learns that Lazar is wanted by the police for murder and threatens his exposure unless he leaves the settlement within 24 hours. Lazar leaves, but before he goes, he burns down the warehouse.

Ninon, accompanied by Frederick and an Indian guide Lawatha, set out by dogsled to notify the police. Overtaken by a blizzard, they are forced to seek refuge in a cabin in which Lazard is already sheltering. Lazard attacks Ninon and Frederick comes to her aid, but is badly injured. Just as he is about to succumb, Lawatha joins the struggle. Lazar fatally stabs the Indian guide, but as he dies, Lawatha manages to shoot and kill the renegade.

Ninon and Frederick struggle back to safety through the snow, the young woman bringing her injured lover triumphantly home. She realizes that Frederick is her idea of a real man and she agrees to marry him.

== Cast ==
- Katherine MacDonald as Ninon Le Compte
- Bryant Washburn as Frederick Van Court III
- Mitchell Lewis as Lazar
- Francis McDonald as Lawatha, Indian Guide
- June Elvidge as Flora O'Hare
- Clarissa Selwynne as Jeanette Duval
- Boris Karloff as Raoul Maris

== See also ==
- Boris Karloff filmography
