= Shark Monroe =

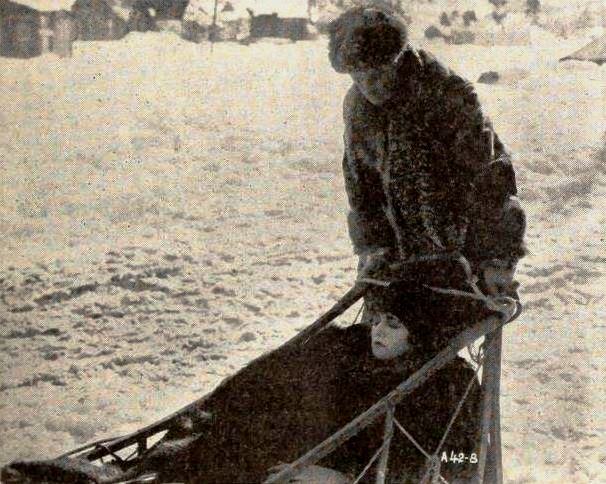
- Film still
- Directed by: William S. Hart
- Screenplay by: C. Gardner Sullivan
- Produced by: William S. Hart; Thomas H. Ince
- Starring: William S. Hart; Katherine MacDonald; Joseph Singleton; George A. McDaniel; Bert Sprotte
- Cinematography: Joseph H. August
- Production companies: Artcraft Pictures Corporation; William S. Hart Productions
- Distributed by: Paramount Pictures
- Release date: June 30, 1918
- Running time: 50 minutes
- Country: United States
- Language: Silent (English intertitles)

Shark Monroe is a 1918 American silent adventure film directed by William S. Hart and written by C. Gardner Sullivan. The film stars William S. Hart, Katherine MacDonald, Joseph Singleton, George A. McDaniel, and Bert Sprotte. The film was released on June 30, 1918, by Paramount Pictures.

== Plot ==
As described in a film magazine, Shark Monroe, owner of a sealing vessel, agrees to take Marjorie Hilton and her brother Webster to Skagway, provided Webster works his own passage. Majorie falls into the power of Big Baxter, a notorious character off the Alaskan coast, and agrees to marry him. Shark appears and, while his men hold the wedding party at bay, marries and runs off with Marjorie. At the end of two weeks he agrees to safely return her to Baxter's camp. Webster and Baxter arrive, however, and to restore the young man confidence Shark allows Webster to beat him in a fist fight. Later, after overhearing Baxter lie about him, Shark kills Baxter with one blow, and Marjorie has her eyes opened as to the bigness of the man.

== Cast ==
- William S. Hart as Shark Monroe
- Katherine MacDonald as Marjorie Hilton
- Joseph Singleton as Big Baxter
- George A. McDaniel as Webster Hilton
- Bert Sprotte as Onion McNab

== Reception ==
Like many American films of the time, Shark Monroe was subject to restrictions and cuts by city and state film censorship boards. For example, the Chicago Board of Censors cut, in Reel 2, the intertitle "Prospering through the degradation of women" and, in Reel 5, the intertitle "He's dead".

== Preservation status ==
A copy of the film is preserved in the Museum of Modern Art, New York City.
