= Not So Long Ago =

1925 film

Not so Long Ago
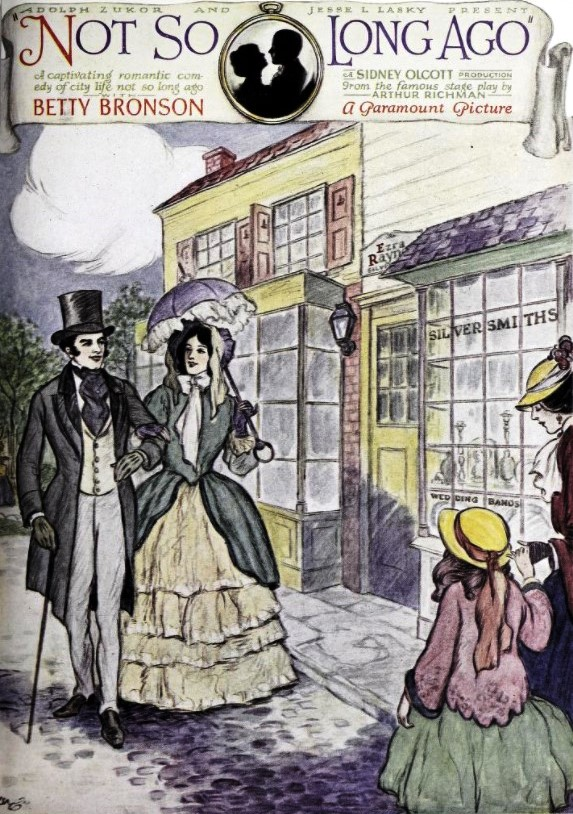
- Advertisement
- Directed by: Sidney Olcott
- Written by: Violet Clark
- Based on: Not So Long Ago, a Comedy in Prologue, Three Acts, and Epilogue by Arthur Richman
- Produced by: Adolph Zukor; Jesse Lasky; John Lynch
- Starring: Betty Bronson; Ricardo Cortez
- Cinematography: James Wong Howe
- Edited by: Patricia Rooney
- Production company: Famous Players–Lasky
- Distributed by: Paramount Pictures
- Release date: September 7, 1925
- Running time: 7 reels
- Country: United States
- Language: Silent (English intertitles)

Not So Long Ago is a 1925 American silent drama film produced by Jesse Lasky and Adolph Zukor and distributed by Paramount. It was directed by Sidney Olcott with Betty Bronson and Ricardo Cortez in the leading roles.

== Plot ==
As described in a film magazine review, Betty, the daughter of Dover the inventor, works by the day as a seamstress in the Ballard home. Billy Ballard, the Beau Brummel of the town, is engaged to Ursula Kent, but Betty pretends to herself in her day dreams that he is in love with her. Sam Robinson, the town’s smart aleck, proposes to her and is indignant when she rejects him. Dover borrows money from Flint to continue the invention of his horseless carriage. When the time draws near for the notes to be paid to Flint, Dover is unable to pay them. Betty tells Sam that Billy has proposed to her. Sam tells this to her father who goes to the Ballard home. He tells Billy Ballard that he will expect the customary courtship between Betty and him (Billy). Billy then asks if he might call on Betty. At his first call, Flint attempts to collect the money for his notes. Billy offers to buy them but Betty will not permit him to do so. When Billy admits to Betty that he is engaged to Ursula, Betty becomes angry. But Billy finds that Ursula, like him, is in love with another. When their engagement is broken, Betty becomes reconciled. Flint has arranged with Dover to take the horseless carriage on the following day. Robinson has wagered with Dover that he can beat the machine in a walk down Fifth Avenue. The race is held but as the engine finishes the race a winner the boiler explodes and destroys the entire machine. Flint cannot take it away but receives the money from Billy, who promises to back Dover in building a new one. Betty is happy with her engagement to Billy.

== Cast ==
- Betty Bronson as Betty Dover
- Ricardo Cortez as Billy Ballard
- Edwards Davis as Jerry Flint
- Julia Swayne Gordon as Mrs. Ballard
- Larry Wheat as Sam Robinson (credited as Laurence Wheat)
- Julia Gadsden as Ursula Kent (credited as Jacquelin Gadsdon)
- Dan Crimmins as Michael Dover
- Peggy Ahern as Little Girl
- Austen Jewell as Little Boy
- Joseph Mills

== Preservation ==
With no prints of Not So Long Ago located in any film archives, it is a lost film.
