= The Girl from Gay Paree =

1927 film

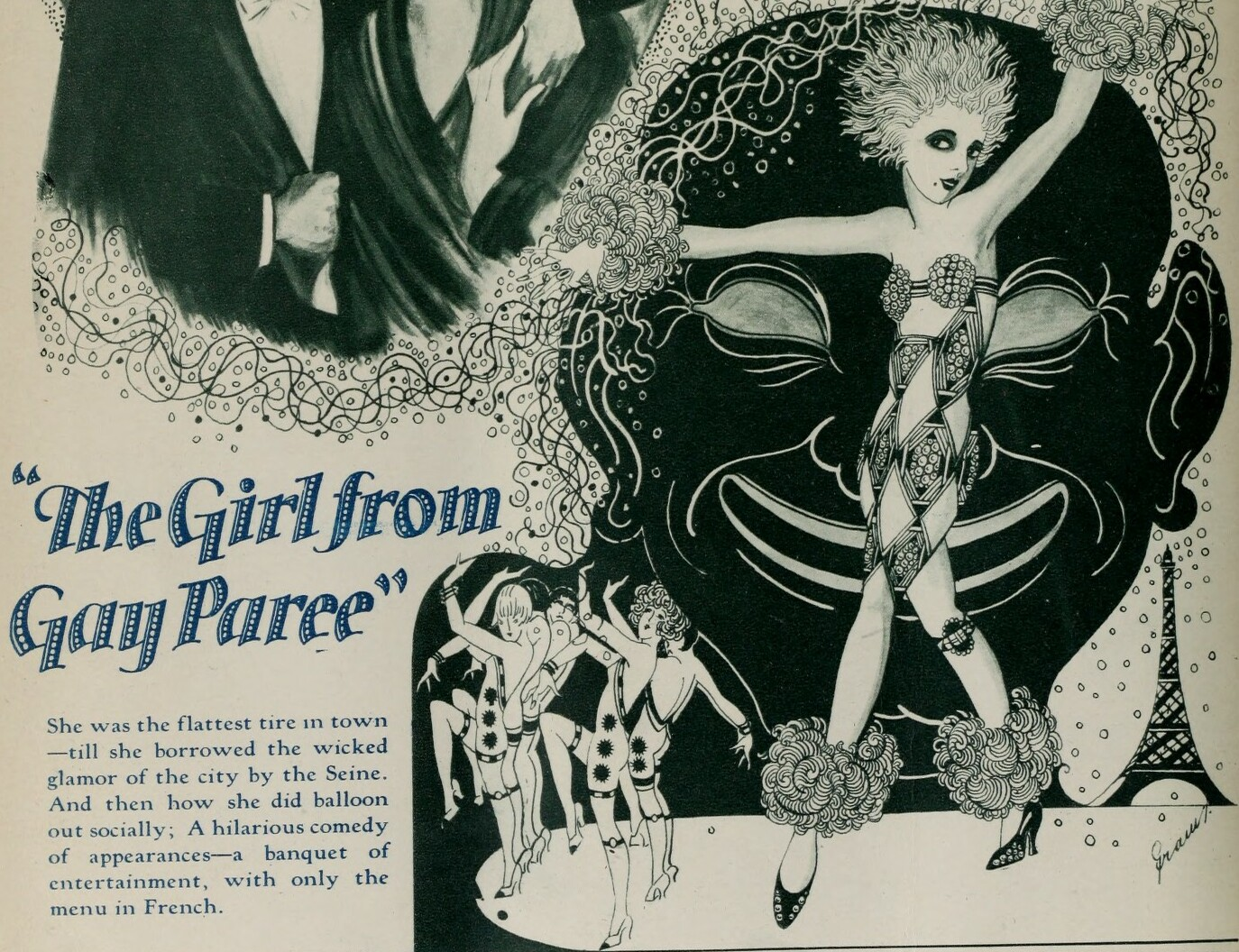
- Directed by: Phil Goldstone; Arthur Gregor
- Written by: Violet Clark
- Starring: Lowell Sherman; Barbara Bedford
- Cinematography: Max Dupont; George Stevens; E. Fox Walker
- Edited by: Martin G. Cohn
- Distributed by: Tiffany Pictures
- Release date: September 15, 1927
- Running time: 6 reels
- Country: United States
- Language: Silent (English intertitles)

The Girl from Gay Paree is a 1927 American silent comedy film directed by Phil Goldstone and Arthur Gregor and starring Lowell Sherman and Barbara Bedford. It was produced and released by Tiffany Pictures.

== Cast ==
- Lowell Sherman as Robert Ryan
- Barbara Bedford as Mary Davis
- Malcolm McGregor as Kenneth Ward
- Betty Blythe as Mademoiselle Fanchon
- Walter Hiers as Sam
- Margaret Livingston as Gertie
- Templar Saxe as Wayne
- Leo White as Monsieur Logier

== Preservation ==
A print of The Girl from Gay Paree is preserved at the BFI National Archive.
