= Battling Jane =

1918 film by Elmer Clifton

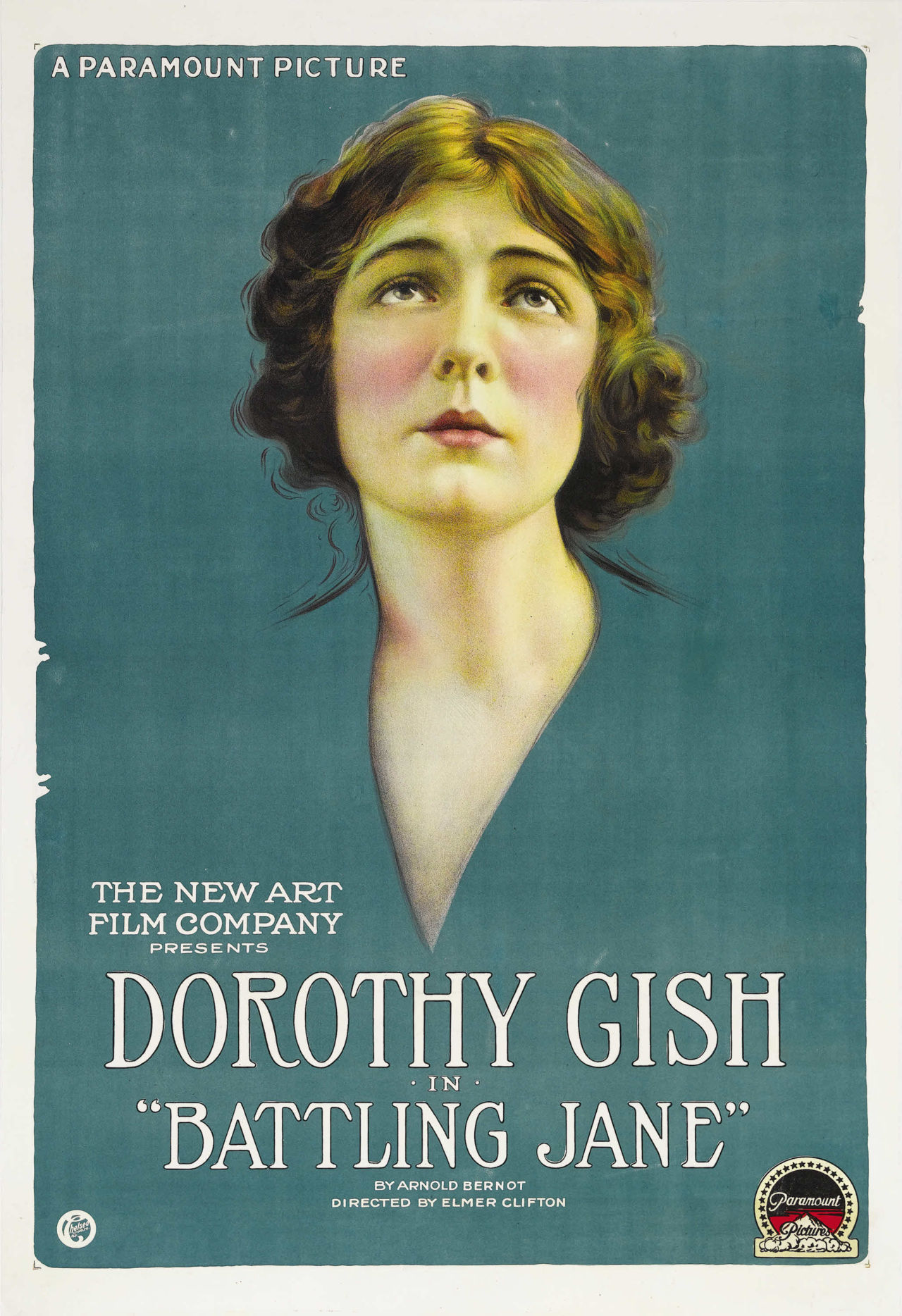
- Directed by: Elmer Clifton
- Written by: Arnold Bernot
- Starring: Dorothy Gish; May Hall; Katherine MacDonald
- Cinematography: Karl Brown
- Production company: New Art Film Company
- Distributed by: Paramount Pictures
- Release date: September 29, 1918
- Running time: 5 reels, 4458 feet
- Country: United States
- Language: Silent (English intertitles)

Battling Jane is a 1918 American silent comedy-drama film. It was directed by Elmer Clifton as a vehicle for Dorothy Gish and included some patriotic overtones.

== Plot ==
Jane, a waitress at a small-town Maine hotel, assumes guardianship of a baby whose mother has died. The baby's rakish father, Dr. Sheldon, conspires to steal prize money won by Jane after she enters the child in a baby show. Jane manages to hold the doctor and his accomplice at bay until help arrives, then uses the prize money to help the war effort by purchasing Liberty Bonds and donating the rest to the Red Cross.

== Cast ==
- Dorothy Gish as Jane
- May Hall as Mrs. Sheldon
- Katherine MacDonald as Poliet's daughter
- Ernest Marion as Baby Sheldon
- Bertram Grassby as The Crook
- Adolph Lestina as Mr. Pollett
- Kate Toncray as Charwoman
- George Nichols as Dr. Sheldon (credited as George Nicholls)

== Release ==
The film was released in the United States in September 1918, and in Canada shortly before the new year. In some venues, it was accompanied by the comedy film The Goat with Fred Stone. It would be one of the most financially successful films made by Gish for Paramount.

Battling Jane received good reviews for its performances and its scenario: "(T)hough by turns pure comedy and pure melodrama, (it) is logically and consistently told." A reviewer for the Toronto World thought Dorothy Gish "a marvel of cleverness... as charming as in any of her previous parts. Director Elmer Clifton leaves nothing to be desired, either in point of acting or investiture. The support is unusually capable." The Evening Post of Wellington, New Zealand, found the lead role "quaint"; nonetheless it praised both the "cleverly depicted" story and the leading lady: "There are hundreds of Janes in the world, no doubt... Ms. Gish portrays the character realistically."

The film played at the Strand Theatre in Christchurch, New Zealand in June 1919.

Like many American films of the time, Battling Jane was subject to cuts by city and state film censorship boards. For example, the Chicago Board of Censors required a cut, in Reel 2. of the knifing of a man in Jane's room and, in Reel 5, the last scene of a man robbing the safe.

== Preservation ==
With no holdings located in archives, Battling Jane is considered a lost film.

== See also ==
- The House That Shadows Built (1931 promotional film by Paramount)
