= Tom Forman (actor) =

American actor (1893–1926)

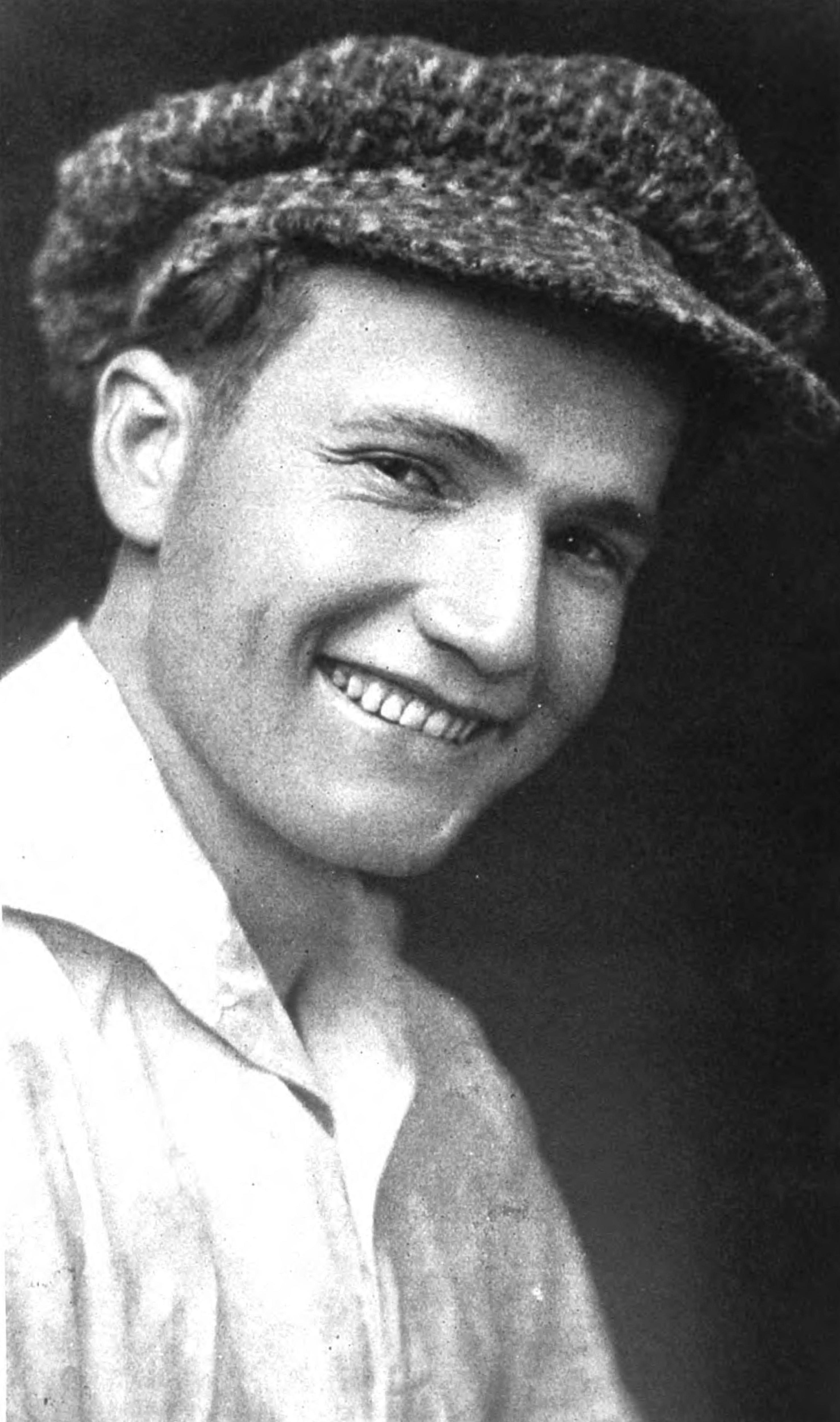
- 1915
- Born: February 22, 1893; Mitchell County, Texas, U.S.
- Died: November 7, 1926 (aged 33); Venice, California, U.S.
- Occupations: Actor, film director, film producer, writer
- Years active: 1913–1926
- Spouse: Mary Mersch (divorced 1923)
- Relatives: Madge Bellamy (cousin)

Tom Forman (February 22, 1893 – November 7, 1926) was an American motion picture actor, director, writer, and producer of the early 1920s.

== Life and career ==
Texas-born Forman made his first film for Jesse L. Lasky's production company in 1914. With the exception of service at the front during World War I, he had a successful career as both an actor and director. Forman directed Lon Chaney's Shadows (1922), but his biggest achievement was realised directing the second screen version of Owen Wister's The Virginian (1923). After his career faltered, he was reduced to working on cheap Poverty Row melodramas. Forman is also known for his work with Edith Taliaferro in Young Romance.

Forman was set to direct the Columbia film The Wreck, which was to start shooting on November 8, 1926; however on the evening of November 7, Forman died by suicide by shooting himself through the heart at his parents' home in Venice, California.

Adela Rogers St. Johns based the character of Maximillan Carey in her original story for What Price Hollywood? (1932) on Forman.

== Family ==
He was a cousin of silent screen star Madge Bellamy.

== Filmography ==
=== Actor ===
- The Treachery of a Scar (1913)
- John, the Wagoner (1913)
- Baffled, But Not Beaten (1913)
- The Alibi (1913)
- Virtue Is Its Own Reward (1914)
- Lights and Shadows (1914)
- Young Romance (1915)
- A Gentleman of Leisure (1915)
- The Governor's Lady (1915)
- The Woman (1915)
- Stolen Goods (1915)
- The Wild Goose Chase (1915)
- Chimmie Fadden (1915)
- Kindling (1915)
- The Fighting Hope (1915)
- The Puppet Crown (1915)
- The Marriage of Kitty (1915)
- Out of the Darkness (1915)
- The Explorer (1915)
- Chimmie Fadden Out West (1915)
- The Unknown (1915)
- The Ragamuffin (1916)
- To Have and to Hold (1916)
- Sweet Kitty Bellairs (1916)
- The Thousand-Dollar Husband (1916)
- The Clown (1916)
- Public Opinion (1916)
- Unprotected (1916)
- The Yellow Pawn (1916)
- The Evil Eye (1917)
- The American Consul (1917)
- On Record (1917)
- Those Without Sin (1917)
- The Cost of Hatred (1917)
- The Tides of Barnegat (1917)
- The Jaguar's Claws (1917)
- Her Strange Wedding (1917)
- Forbidden Paths (1917)
- A Kiss for Susie (1917)
- Hashimura Togo (1917)
- For Better, for Worse (1919)
- Louisiana (1919)
- The Heart of Youth (1919)
- Told in the Hills (1919)
- The Tree of Knowledge (1920)
- The Sea Wolf (1920) with Noah Beery Sr.
- The Round-Up (1920) with Roscoe Arbuckle and Wallace Beery
- White Shoulders (1922)
- Hoboken to Hollywood (1926)
- Devil's Dice (1926)

=== Director ===
- The Ladder of Lies (1920)
- The Sins of Rosanne (1920)
- The Easy Road (1921)
- The City of Silent Men (1921)
- White and Unmarried (1921)
- Cappy Ricks (1921)
- A Prince There Was (1921)
- If You Believe It, It's So (1922)
- White Shoulders (1922)
- Shadows (1922)
- The Woman Conquers (1922)
- Money! Money! Money! (1923)
- The Girl Who Came Back (1923)
- Are You a Failure? (1923)
- The Broken Wing (1923)
- The Virginian (1923)
- April Showers (1923)
- The Fighting American (1924)
- Roaring Rails (1924)
- The Flaming Forties (1924)
- Flattery (1925)
- The Crimson Runner (1925)
- Off the Highway (1925)
- The People vs. Nancy Preston (1925)
- The Midnight Flyer (1925)
- Whispering Canyon (1926)
- Devil's Dice (1926)

=== Writer ===
- The Measure of a Man (1915)
- The Threads of Fate (1915)
- The Desert Breed (1915)
- Sins of Her Parent (1916)
- The Trouble Buster (1917)
- The Round-Up (1920)
- The Broken Wing (1923)
