= Mr. Fix-It =

1918 film by Allan Dwan

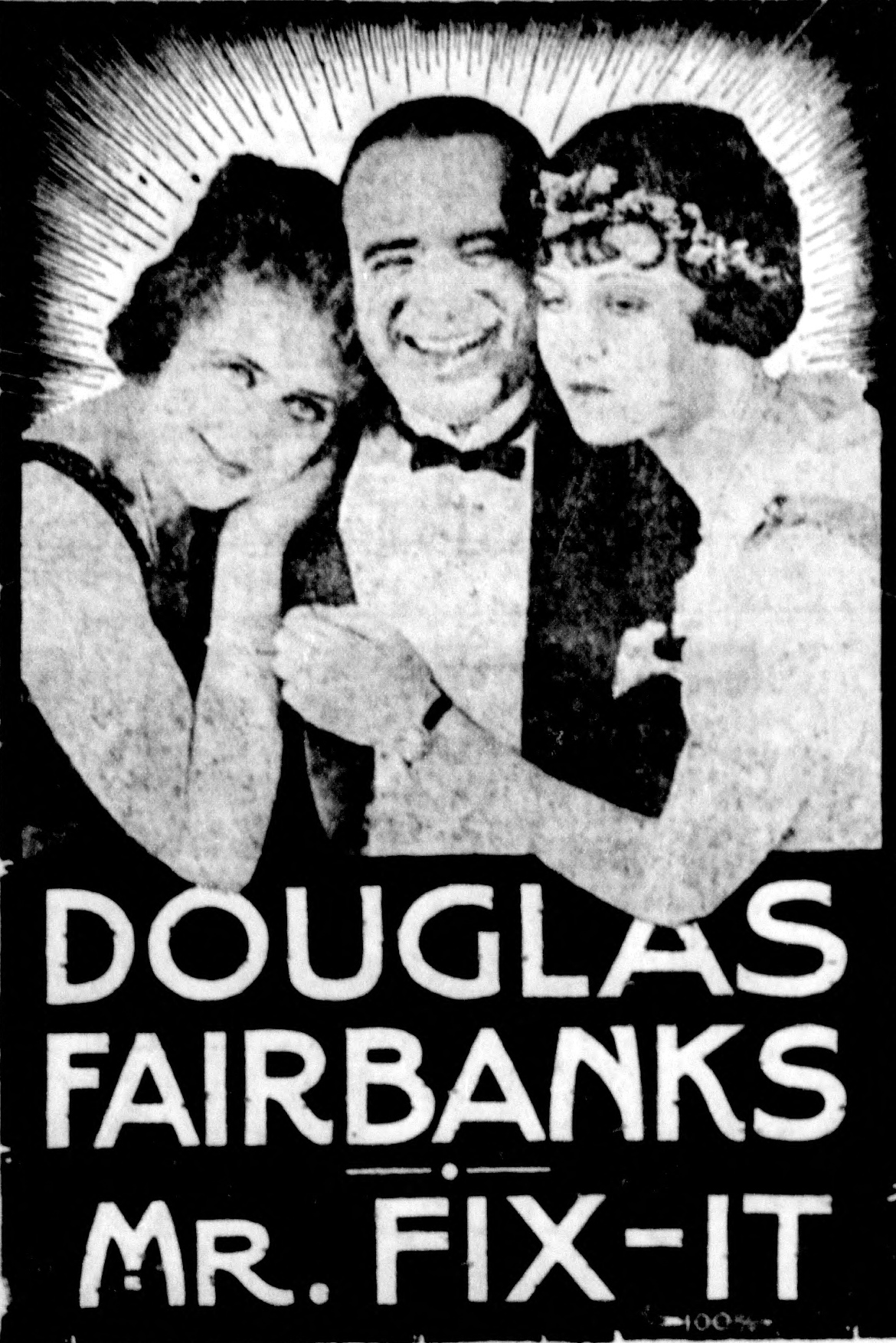
- Newspaper advertisement
- Directed by: Allan Dwan
- Written by: Ernest Butterworth (story); Allan Dwan; Joseph Henabery
- Produced by: Douglas Fairbanks; Jesse L. Lasky
- Starring: Douglas Fairbanks; Wanda Hawley; Marjorie Daw; Katherine MacDonald; Frank Campeau; Ida Waterman; Fred Goodwins
- Cinematography: Hugh McClung
- Production company: Famous Players–Lasky / Artcraft
- Distributed by: Paramount Pictures
- Release date: April 15, 1918
- Running time: 50 minutes
- Country: United States
- Language: Silent (English intertitles)

Mr. Fix-It is a 1918 American silent comedy film starring Douglas Fairbanks, Marjorie Daw, and Wanda Hawley, directed by Allan Dwan.

== Plot ==
As described in a film magazine, because of his ability to fix things Dick Remington becomes known as "Mr. Fix-It" and enters the aristocratic home of the Burroughs as their nephew. Before long he has melted the stone hearts of three aunts and an uncle, and won the heart of Mary McCullough in addition to setting aright the affairs of pretty Georgiana Burroughs and Olive Van Tassell.

Lobby card

== Cast ==
- Douglas Fairbanks as Dick Remington
- Wanda Hawley as Mary McCullough
- Marjorie Daw as Marjorie Threadwell
- Frank Campeau as Uncle Henry Burroughs
- Katherine MacDonald as Georgiana Burroughs
- Leslie Stuart as Reginald Burroughs
- Ida Waterman as Aunt Agatha Burroughs
- Alice H. Smith as Aunt Priscilla Burroughs
- Mrs. H.R. Hancock as Aunt Laura Burroughs
- Mr. Russell as Butler Jarvis
- Fred Goodwins as Gideon Van Tassell
- Margaret Landis as Olive Van Tassell
- Charles Stevens as Gangster (uncredited)
- Gustav von Seyffertitz as Doctor (uncredited)

== Reception ==
Like many American films of the time, Mr. Fix-It was subject to restrictions and cuts by city and state film censorship boards. For example, the Chicago Board of Censors cut, in Reel 5, the policeman arresting women in kimono coming from raided house of ill repute.

== Preservation status ==
On July 16, 2011, at the Castro Theatre in San Francisco, the San Francisco Silent Film Festival presented a restored print of the film from the George Eastman House.

Mr. Fix-It (1918)

== See also ==
- List of rediscovered films
