= The Woman Thou Gavest Me (novel) =

1913 novel by Hall Caine

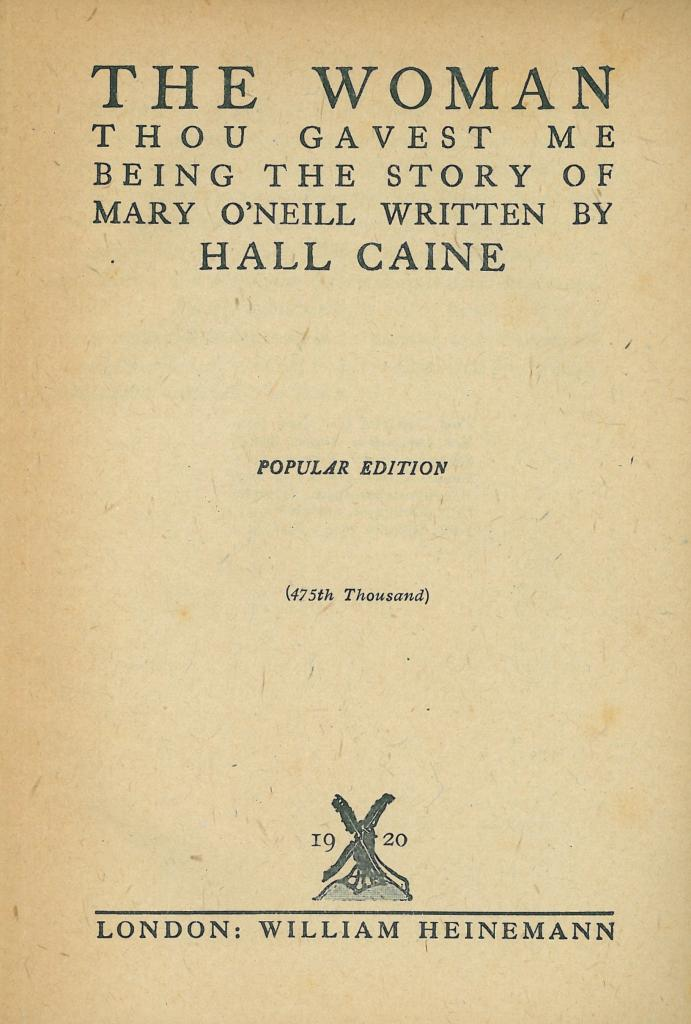
- Title page of the 1920 popular edition
- Author: Hall Caine
- Language: English
- Published: 1913 (Heinemann)
- Publication place: UK
- Media type: Print (hardcover)

The Woman Thou Gavest Me is a best-selling 1913 British novel by Hall Caine. The book is a fictional first-person account of a Catholic woman's struggle after marrying the wrong man. It was one of Caine's most contentious books, causing outrage on its release for its handling of adultery, illegitimacy and divorce. It was the seventh-best-selling novel of 1913 and was made into a film in 1919.

== Plot ==
=== First Part: My Girlhood ===
Mary O'Neill is brought up in Ellan, loved and cared for by her invalid mother within a house dominated by hostile and cruel relations. Mary is sent to a convent school in Rome at the age of seven. Over the subsequent ten years her mother dies, and she grows in religious devotion until she decides to enter a convent. However, her father instead decrees that she should be married. Before returning to Ellan, Mary again meets her childhood friend, Martin Conrad, who is aghast to hear that she is to marry Lord Raa, a known 'profligate and reprobate.' But they are both powerless to oppose Mary's father's wishes.

=== Second Part: My Marriage ===
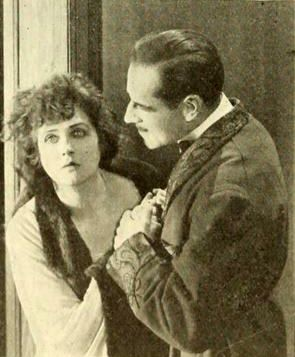
The 1919 film depiction of Lord Raa trying to force himself on Mary

Back in Ellan, Mary is troubled to meet the foppish Lord Raa, who is clear in his opinion that their marriage is an open arrangement for kudos and money. Her feeling about the marriage is confirmed by letters from Martin Conrad which reveal that Lord Raa has a mistress in London. However, Mary's family have invested too much in the arrangement, both in money and arrangements, to change their minds. Against her better judgement, Mary satisfies her family's and the community's expectations and goes ahead with the marriage.

=== Third Part: My Honeymoon ===
Lord Raa soon proves himself to be a repugnant and terrible person on their honeymoon. Having attempted to rape Mary on their wedding night, Lord Raa then begins an affair with a former school colleague of Mary's, Alma Lier. Mary eventually confronts Lord Raa about the affair, but instead of denying anything, Lord Raa blames Mary, claiming that he was forced to another woman since she was "no company for anybody but the saints and angels." Mary then happens to meet Martin Conrad, fresh back from his successful journey to the South Pole. She is instantly awash with happiness, which Lord Raa and Alma notice darkly.

=== Fourth Part: I Fall in Love ===
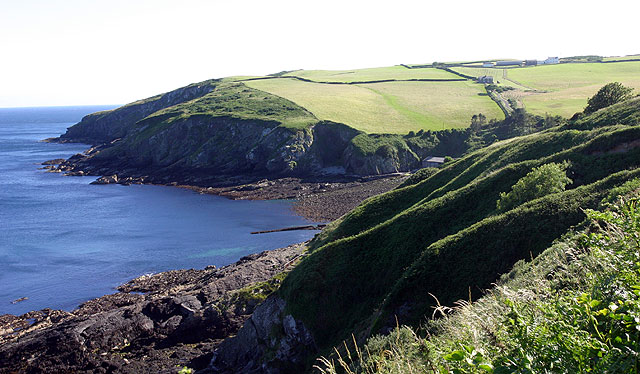
Port Soderick, arguably the model for the location of Castle Raa

Mary and Martin soon fall in love. This frightens the highly moral and religious Mary, so she flees back to Ellan. However, Alma and Lord Raa's entourage accompany Mary and her husband, and their home is given over to the debauchery of drinking, gambling and immoral living. Mary makes unsuccessful enquiries about getting a divorce and returns to find the house vacated of guests, as they have ominously gone off on a cruise when it was discovered that Martin was coming to visit. Despite her best intentions and determined attempts at self-denial, she and Martin admit their love and, on the eve of his departure on another mission to the South Pole, she goes to him in his room.

=== Fifth Part: I Become a Mother ===
After Martin leaves for Antarctica, Mary finds that she is pregnant. She flees Castle Raa secretly and travels to London. After evading discovery with the help of a schoolhood friend, Mary hears of the (ultimately false) newspaper reports that Martin had died at sea. After failing to find any better accommodation, it is in the poor area of Bayswater that she gives birth to a baby girl.

=== Sixth Part: I am Lost ===
In order to earn money, Mary gives the child to be cared for by a woman in Ilford and gets a job as a seamstress in Whitechapel. However, poverty drives up the demands of her working day and lessens her ability to act against the poor care that her child is receiving. Upon learning that she has an illegitimate child, Mary's landlord and employer casts her out and she is faced with a desperate need to earn a large sum of money in order to pay for her sick child's care. Without other options, she determines to become a prostitute, but is saved from acting on this when Martin arrives back from the Antarctic and saves her from the street.

=== Seventh Part: I Am Found ===
Conrad takes Mary home to his parents' house in Ellan to recover. Lord Raa divorces her in the courts, apparently leaving the way open for her and Martin to marry. However, Mary is recalled to her Catholic vows and sees that she cannot marry again, but she is put off telling Martin this when she discovers that she is terminally ill and without long to live. Mary doesn't wish to spoil her remaining time with Martin and so pretends not to be ill until the very last. She dies peacefully at home and Martin takes back up his scientific task in the Antarctic.

== Publication and reception ==
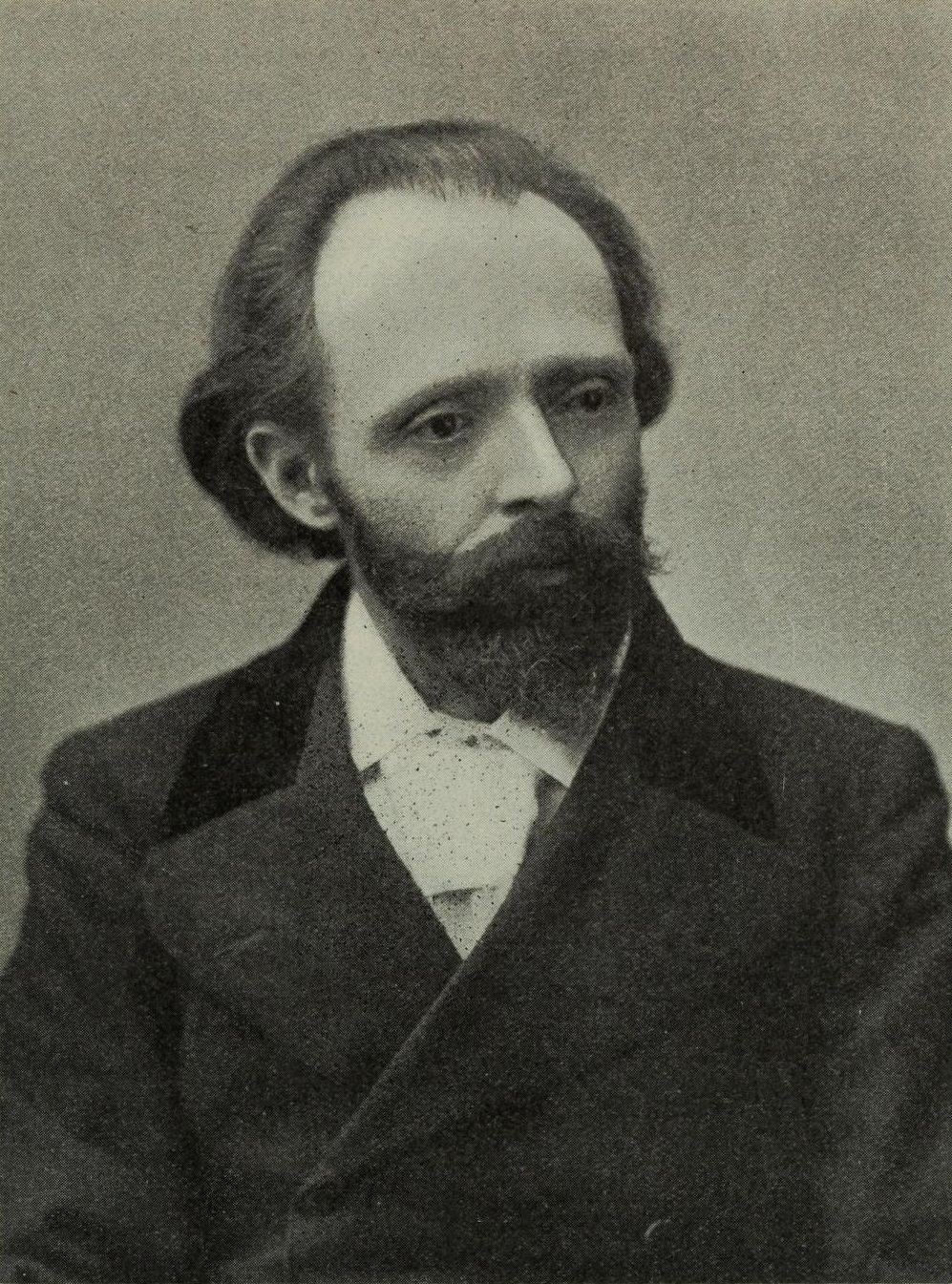
Hall Caine

Hall Caine first conceived of the idea for The Woman Thou Gavest Me in 1890 when his two sons visited him in Rome during his time working on The Eternal City. The idea for the novel gestated during his work on two further novels before The Woman Thou Gavest Me began its serial release in Hearst's Magazine in October 1912 (running for a period alongside the serial of Winston Churchill's The Inside of the Cup). The novel was complete and released in book form in July 1913.

Even considering the great outcry that his previous novels received for their "coarseness" and "immorality", The Woman Thou Gavest Me brought about 'the biggest furore of any of his novels [...] a storm of criticism and abuse broke out over Caine's head when the book came out.' Many circulating libraries refused to stock the book. Understandably most virulent in their derision of the book were Catholics, who found the book to be offensive in many ways, not least in being an apparent attempt to condone adultery and illegitimacy.

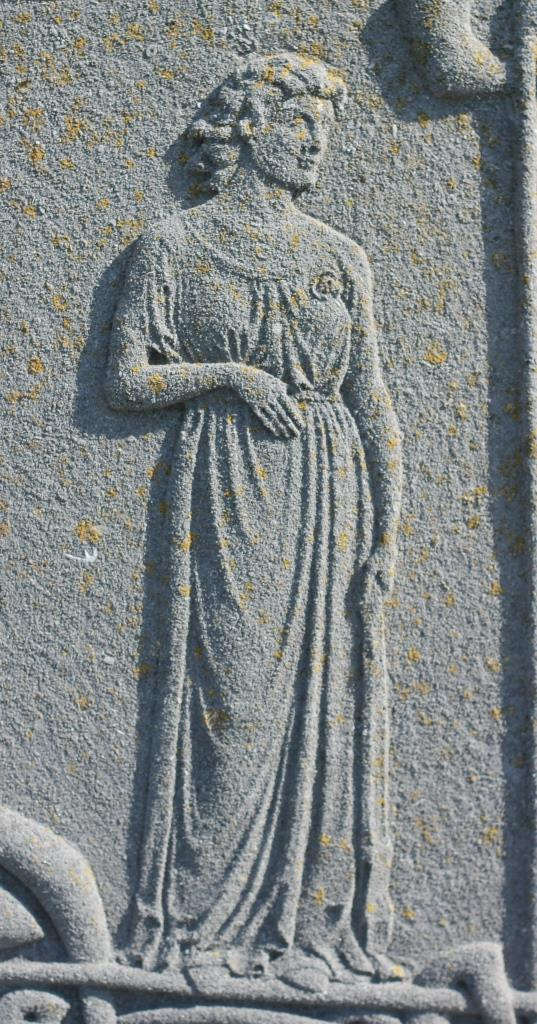
The depiction of Mary O'Neill by Archibald Knox on Hall Caine's gravestone

The novel was received poorly by the critics. The Nation called it an 'absurd book'; 'the sort of sensational mediocrity which is bound to appeal to the vulgar.' The Outlook spoke of how in the novel 'melodramatic situations and turgid rhetoric are the rule'; 'the mixture of sentiment, high-flown language, and unnecessarily bold discussion of the marriage relation makes reading disagreeable and tedious.' However, some positive reviews were received, such as in The Literary Digest, whose review began:

For intensity of emotion, detailed analysis of psychological conditions, and passionate human experiences, the reader will find all that can be desired from the pen of Hall Caine. Each page is throbbing with emotion, usually in the superlative degree.

However, despite the predominantly negative critical reception, and in part thanks to the furore surrounding the book, The Woman Thou Gavest Me became the seventh best-selling novel of 1913, selling over half a million copies before the end of the year. This was a reflection of the popular success that Caine continued to receive in defiance of his critical reception at this time. Most marked were the positive personal reactions he received from female readers of the novel, apparently leading to the fact that even 'years later he was still getting letters from women asking how he knew so exactly how they felt.'. One such woman wrote to Caine telling him that:

"I cannot express my thoughts but you - how beautiful to be so gifted, with such a mind and the power to express. I cannot tell you what the book was to me."

The novel was to remain in print until Caine's death in 1931, when it was in its 29th English edition and had been translated nine times. The book was considered of such importance to Hall Caine's life work that the character of Mary O’Neill was one of the characters from his novels chosen to be carved onto his gravestone by Archibald Knox. For this character, Knox apparently modelled Mary's likeness on a photograph of Hall Caine's own wife, Mary Hall Caine.

== Locations ==
Having caused upset with the real locations of his previous novels, Caine was keen to try to avoid much of this in The Woman Thou Gavest Me. However, his attempt to obscure the identity of the island 'Ellan' is very weak, as his modern biographer notes: "['Ellan' is] the thinnest of disguises for the Isle of Man." Some of the relatively obvious Manx locations and identifiers include the following:

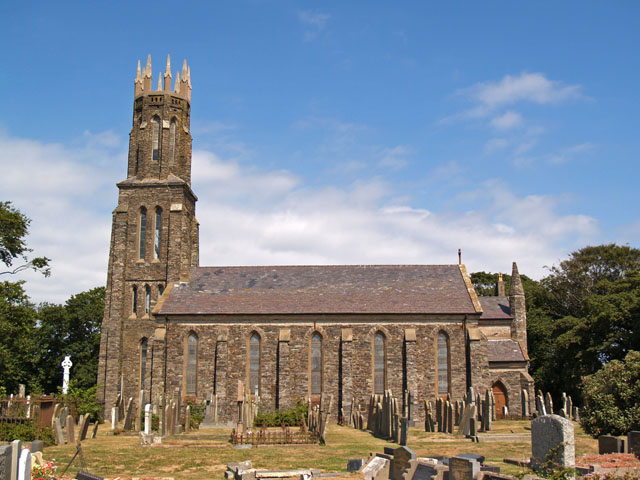
St. Mary's Church, Ballaugh

- 'Blackwater,' the main town of Ellan, is identifiable as Douglas, the capital of the Isle of Man. The name is popularly thought to be derived from the Manx names for the rivers that meet in the town; the Dhoo, meaning 'black,' and the Glass, meaning 'green.'
- 'Holmtown,' the town where Mary's father's lawyer lives (Pt. II, Chap. 24), is the original name of Peel.
- Castle Raa is almost certainly conceived of as located at Port Soderick, being apparently a half-hour drive south of Blackwater/Douglas (Pt. IV, Chap. 56), a walk away from a headland overlooking the town (Pt. IV, Chap. 64), and connected to a glen of the same name that leads to the shore (Pt. IV, Chap. 66).
- The name Raa is believed to be inspired by Rhaa Mooar, "an ancient earthworks and pile of fallen stones on Maughold Head."
- The hotel in which Mary and Lord Raa spend their honeymoon is identifiable as the Fort Anne Hotel, which used to stand on the southern side of the river overlooking Douglas (Pt. III, Chap. 35).
- Mary's childhood home is located close to Ballaugh, where the local church is St. Mary's. However, the novel's St. Mary's church is described as having the distinctive leaning gate posts of the old Ballaugh Church (Pt. VII, Mary O'Neill's Last Note).
- The school attended by Martin Conrad is King George's School (Pt. I, Chap 10), which is a reflection of King William's College near Castletown.
- When Mary is driven home by her father after her time in Rome, they pass through 'Folksdale,' which is obviously related to Foxdale (Pt. II, Chap. 24).
- At various times distinctive Manx Gaelic or dialect phrases are used by characters in the novel. Notable examples include: "Traa dy liooar" (Pt. II, Chap. 30), "bogh mulish" (Pt. IV, Chap. 51) and the description of things as "middling" (Pt. IV, Chap. 51).

== Film adaptation ==
The novel was adapted for film by Beulah Marie Dix and directed by Hugh Ford. Released on 8 June 1919 in the US, the film starred Katherine MacDonald as Mary MacNeill, Milton Sills as Martin Conrad, Jack Holt as Lord Raa and Fritzi Brunette as Alma. The film received good reviews and was popular with audiences, but it has not survived: "nothing remains of this film but some stills in the National Film Archive."

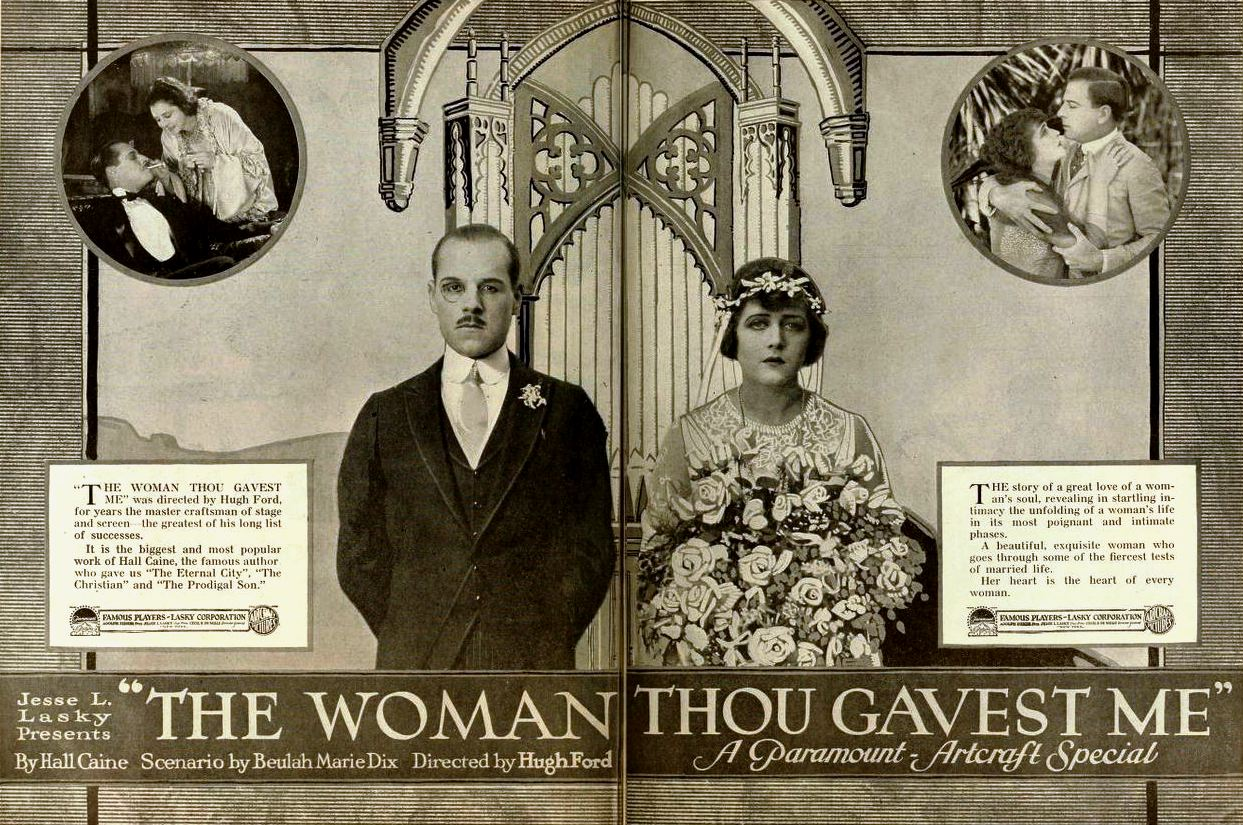
Advert for the 1919 film adaptation

== Quotations ==
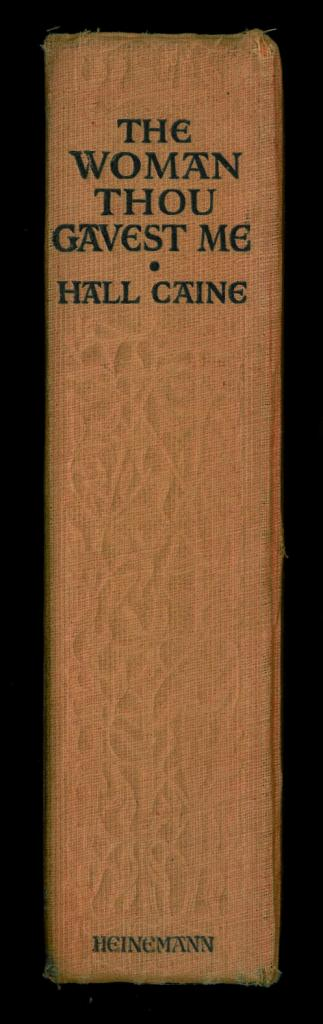
The spine of the 1920 popular edition

- My love for Martin was now like a wound [Pt. IV, Chap. 58, p. 246]
- the suffering woman with her bruised and bleeding soul [Pt. IV, Chap. 59, p. 251]
- I was his. He had taken his own. Nothing counted in the presence of our love. To be only we two together—that was everything. The world and the world's laws, the Church and the Canons of the Church were blotted out, forgotten, lost. [Pt. IV, Chap. 65, p. 282]
- the cruel tangle of my fate. [Pt. IV, Chap. 65, p. 283]
- I did not cry. I felt as if I had reached a depth of suffering that was a thousand fathoms too deep for tears. [Pt. V, Chap. 76, p. 338]
- I looked up towards the sky, but there seemed to be no sky, no moon, and no stars, only a vaporous blackness that came down and closed about me. [Pt. V, Chap. 78, p. 346]
- Nature is stronger than man, and the nature that is inside of us sometimes hits us harder than that which is without. [Pt. VI, Chap. 88, Martin Conrad's Memorandum, p. 405]
- I have loved too much, dear, so the power of life is burnt out for me. My great love—love for my mother, for my darling baby, and above all for you—has consumed me and I cannot live much longer. [Pt. VII, Mary O'Neill's Letter to Martin Conrad, p. 572]
- The world never forgives a woman for the injuries it inflicts on her itself, and I have had too many wounds, darling, to stand by your side and be any help to you. [Pt. VII, Mary O'Neill's Letter to Martin Conrad, p. 573]
- I seem to have been looking into my soul all the time, and when one does that, and gets down to the deep places, one meets all other souls there [Pt. VII, Mary O'Neill's Letter to Martin Conrad, p. 576-7]
- Never allow yourself to think that my life has not been a happy one. Looking back on it now I feel as if I have always had happiness. And when I have not had happiness I have had something far higher and better—blessedness.
  I have had such joy in my life, dear—joy in the beauty of the world, in the sunshine and the moon and the stars and the flowers and the songs of the birds, and then (apart from the divine love that is too holy to speak about) in my religion, in my beloved Church, in the love of my dear mother and my sweet child, and above all—above all in you.
  I feel a sense of sacred thankfulness to God for giving you to me, and if it has not been for long in this life, it will be for ever in the next. [Pt. VII, Mary O'Neill's Letter to Martin Conrad, p. 577-8]
