= Riddle Gawne =

1918 film

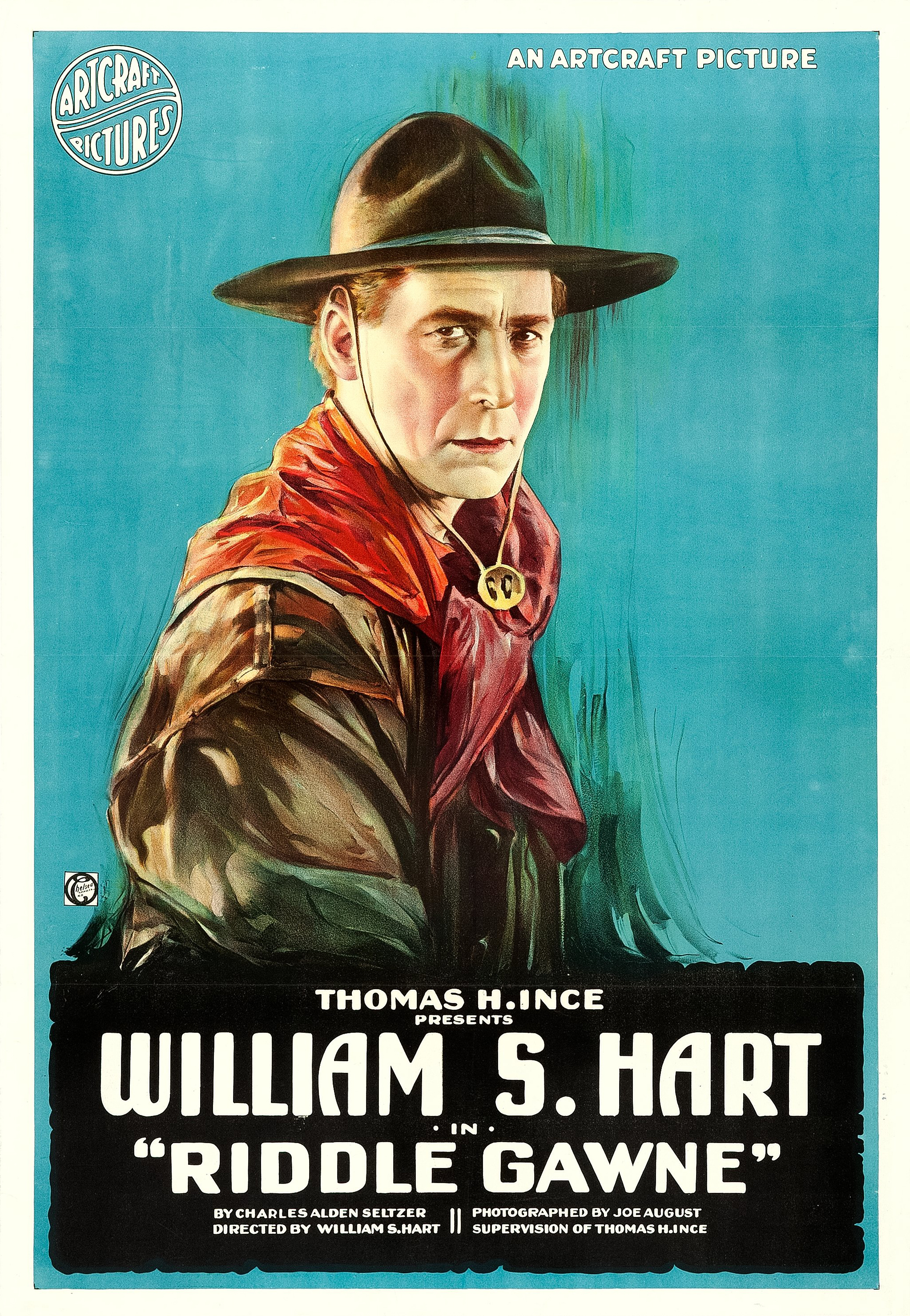
- Theatrical release poster
- Directed by: William S. Hart; Lambert Hillyer
- Written by: Charles Alden Seltzer
- Produced by: William S. Hart; Thomas H. Ince
- Starring: William S. Hart; Lon Chaney; Katherine MacDonald
- Cinematography: Joseph H. August
- Production company: William S. Hart Productions
- Distributed by: Paramount Pictures
- Release date: August 3, 1918
- Running time: 5 reels (50 minutes)
- Country: United States
- Language: Silent (English intertitles)

Riddle Gawne is a 1918 American silent Western film directed by William S. Hart and Lambert Hillyer, and featuring Hart, Katherine MacDonald and Lon Chaney. The film was co-produced by Hart and Thomas H. Ince. The screenplay was written by Charles Alden Seltzer from his earlier novel The Vengeance of Jefferson Gawne. Chaney historian Jon C. Mirsalis claims that Hart contributed greatly to the screenplay but all other sources credit the writing of the screenplay solely to Seltzer.

Considered lost for decades, two of the five reels were found to have survived in a Russian archive and are now kept in the film archive of the Library of Congress. It is unknown if Chaney appears in those two reels. A still exists showing Chaney (as Hame Bozzam) preparing to shoot the unconscious Riddle Gawne in the head. A 1918 advertisement for the showing of the film at Sid Grauman's "Million Dollar Theater" in downtown Los Angeles exists, as well as a publicity photo showing the film's major players in a group shot.

== Plot ==
Riddle Gawne is a man who seeks vengeance on the man who killed his brother Wesley. Before dying, his brother had revealed his killer's name as "Watt Hyat". Riddle buys a cattle ranch and settles down in an area ruled over by criminal cattle rustlers led by Hame Bozzam, who is in reality "Watt Hyat" under an alias.

Kathleen Harkness, the daughter of Colonel Harkness, arrives in the West. Defending her honor, Riddle shoots two of Hame Bozzam's henchmen. Unbeknownst to the young woman, her father is a member of Bozzam's cattle rustlers, and Bozzam holds this fact over the old colonel's head so that he will let Hame marry Kathleen. Hame has Riddle shot, but Riddle survives and is nursed back to health.

Riddle then determines to clean up the town, and in the fight that follows, Bozzam kidnaps Kathleen after fatally wounding her father. Riddle, lone handed, pursues the fleeing man and his gang. After the chase, Riddle fights and kills Bozzam's henchman "Nigger" Paisley. But during the fight, Riddle's leg is broken. Threatening the now injured Riddle, Bozzam reveals his real identity as Watt Hyat, the man who killed Riddle's brother. In an ensuing struggle Hame Bozzam is killed, and Riddle wins Kathleen's hand.

== Cast ==
- William S. Hart as Jefferson "Riddle" Gawne
- Katherine MacDonald as Kathleen Harkness
- Lon Chaney as Hame Bozzam / Watt Hyat
- Gretchen Lederer as Blanche Dillon
- Gertrude Short as Jane Gawne (Riddle's niece)
- Edwin B. Tilton as Colonel Harkness
- Milton Ross as Reb Butler
- George Field as "Nigger" Paisley
- Leon De La Mothe as Jess Cass (credited as Leon Kent)

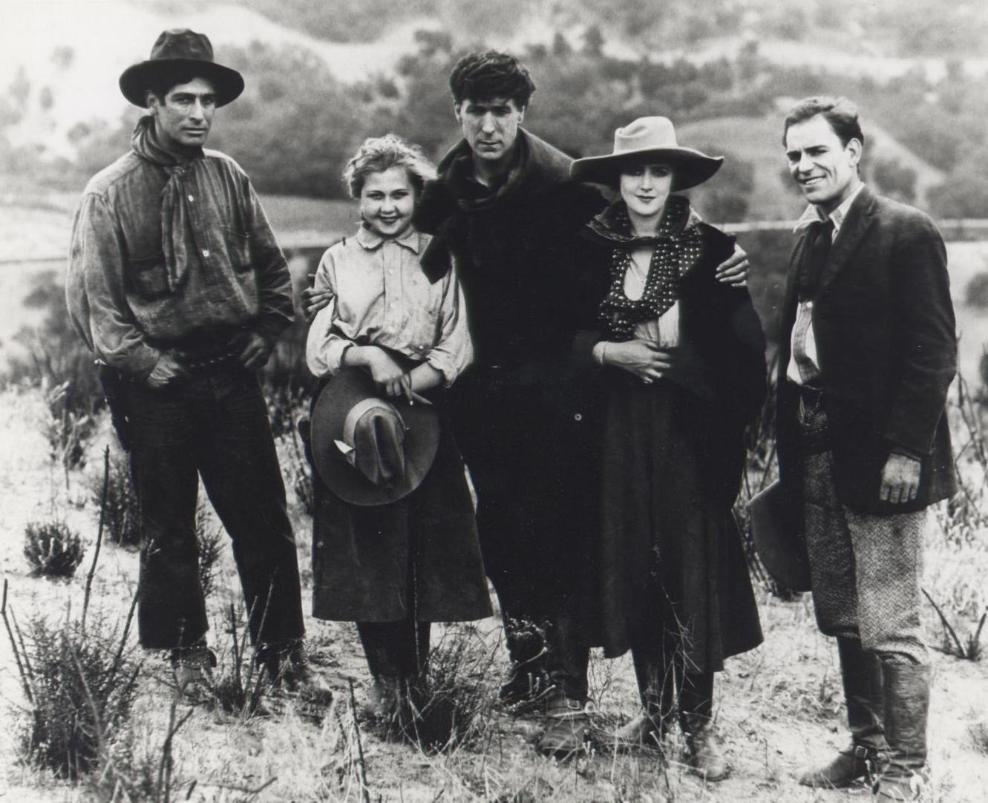
Publicity photo with the cast

== Production ==
Lon Chaney had just left Universal Pictures over a salary dispute before getting hired to appear in Riddle Gawne (at the much higher salary of $125 per week). William S. Hart did not initially want Chaney to play the villain because he felt Chaney was too short to be imposing. It was Lambert Hillyer who talked Hart into using Chaney for the role. (Hillyer claimed his mother had seen Chaney in Hell Morgan's Girl (1917) and called him to Lambert's attention.) Riddle Gawne gave Chaney great exposure to the movie-going public and was instrumental in propelling him to later stardom. (Lambert Hillyer later directed Chaney again in The Shock (1923).)

Parts of the film were shot on location in the Santa Monica Mountains and in Chatsworth, California, from June 14 to early July. A western ranch house was built on a dairy farm for the production and later burned to the ground for a scene in the film.

== Reception ==
The ordinary story of deferred vengeance is not liked by audiences of today... but Riddle Gawne is made to respond to Hart's favorite idea of character conversion, and it is cleverly constructed.

— Moving Picture World

The star has one of those sympathetic roles in which he always shines... Lon Chaney has a prominent character role, and plays it up to the minute... The nature of the story and the typical Hart role that has been given the star to interpret crowds its way right up to the front lines and retains its position as one of Hart's best.

— Motion Picture News

Well, Bill is as quick on the trigger as ever and puts this over with a wallop. This has all of the typical Hart elements with Bill standing off a whole gang... Lon Chaney was an effective willun.

— Wid's Film Daily

== Censorship ==
Like many American films of the time, Riddle Gawne was subject to restrictions and cuts by city and state film censorship boards. For example, the Chicago Board of Censors required cuts in Reel 1 (scene of woman at bar), Reel 2 (two scenes of woman at bar, scene of Riddle shooting man in back, the intertitle "Blanche Dillon, former dance hall girl, now Bozzam's 'housekeeper'", and all scenes of young woman in Bozzam's house, scene of Bozzam slugging Jess Cass with gun), Reel 3 (man shooting Riddle from horse, the intertitle "She may be a good nurse, but she ain't the sort of woman I want", etc.), and Reel 5 (Bozzam shooting woman's father, shooting Riddle, and flashback scene showing the shooting of Riddle's brother).

== See also ==
- List of incomplete or partially lost films
