= Devil's Dice =

1926 film

- Directed by: Tom Forman
- Written by: Frank R. Adams; Charles A. Logue
- Starring: Barbara Bedford; Robert Ellis; Josef Swickard
- Cinematography: Harry Davis
- Production company: Banner Productions
- Distributed by: Sterling Pictures
- Release date: October 5, 1926
- Country: United States
- Languages: Silent; English intertitles

Devil's Dice is a 1926 American silent romance film directed by Tom Forman and starring Barbara Bedford, Robert Ellis and Josef Swickard.

== Cast ==
- Barbara Bedford as Helen Paine
- Robert Ellis as Larry Bannon
- Josef Swickard as Judge Casper Paine
- Tom B. Forman as Oberfield
- James Gordon as Martin Godfrey
- Jack Richardson as Weary

== Bibliography ==
- Munden, Kenneth White. The American Film Institute Catalog of Motion Pictures Produced in the United States, Part 1. University of California Press, 1997.
