= The Woman Thou Gavest Me (film) =

1919 film by Hugh Ford

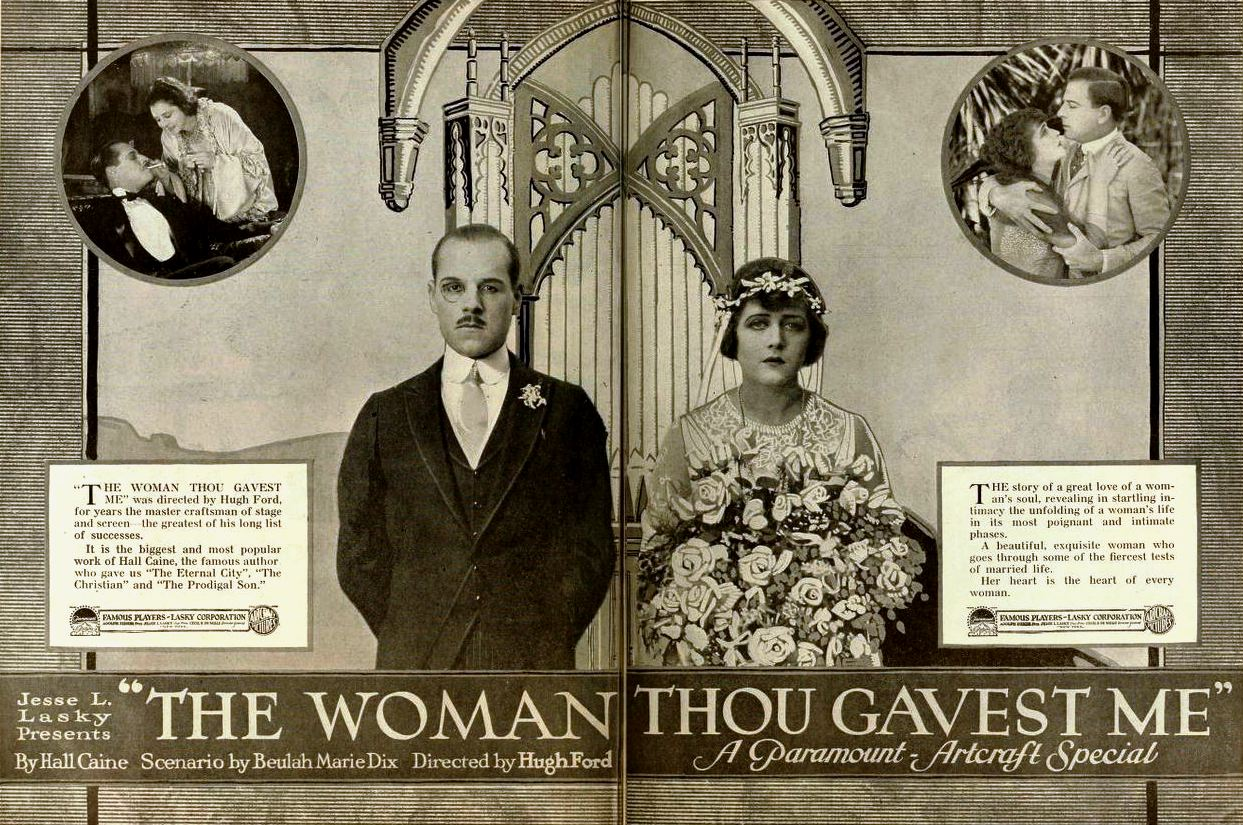
- movie herald spread
- Directed by: Hugh Ford
- Written by: Beulah Marie Dix
- Based on: The Woman Thou Gavest Me by Hall Caine
- Produced by: Adolph Zukor; Jesse Lasky
- Starring: Jack Holt; Katherine MacDonald
- Cinematography: William Marshall
- Production company: Famous Players–Lasky
- Distributed by: Paramount Pictures
- Release date: May 25, 1919
- Running time: 6 reels
- Country: USA
- Language: Silent..English titles

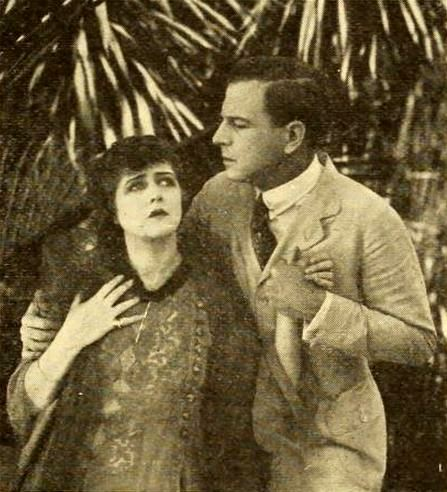
Katherine MacDonald and Milton Sills

The Woman Thou Gavest Me is a 1919 silent film directed by Hugh Ford and starring Jack Holt, Katherine MacDonald and Milton Sills. It was produced by Famous Players–Lasky and distributed through Famous Players–Lasky and Paramount Pictures. The film is based on the 1913 controversial novel The Woman Thou Gavest Me by Hall Caine, adapted for the screen by Beulah Marie Dix. A song of the same name with words and music by Al Piantadosi promoted the film.

== Plot ==
Daniel McNeill swears to take revenge on his landlord Lord Raa for the humiliation Raa had inflicted on him during his childhood. Years later, after making his fortune, McNeill buys Raa's castle and marries his young daughter, Mary to the profligate heir to the Raa title. The married couple leave on their honeymoon, but Mary lives with her husband in name only. Raa refuses to give her a divorce because he would lose all claim to the McNeil fortune.

Mary meets Martin Conrad, an old sweetheart of hers. While Raa entertains an affinity in India, she and Martin find themselves thrown together in Africa. Conrad, an explorer, leaves on an Antarctic voyage. Pregnant, Mary seeks a secluded spot in southern France for the birth, refusing to live with her husband. When Mary's father insists that she return to Lord Raa she tells him the child is Conrad's.

After learning that Conrad had been lost on the expedition a penniless Mary returns to London where she turns to prostitution to make money to care for her child. The first man she approaches is Conrad who has been searching for her.

== Cast ==
- Katherine MacDonald - Mary MacNeill
- Jack Holt - Lord Raa
- Milton Sills - Martin Conrad
- Theodore Roberts - Daniel MacNeill
- Fritzi Brunette - Alma Lier
- Katherine Griffith - Aunt Bridget
- Winter Hall - Minister

== Status ==
This film is lost
