= Katherine MacDonald =

American actress (1891–1956)

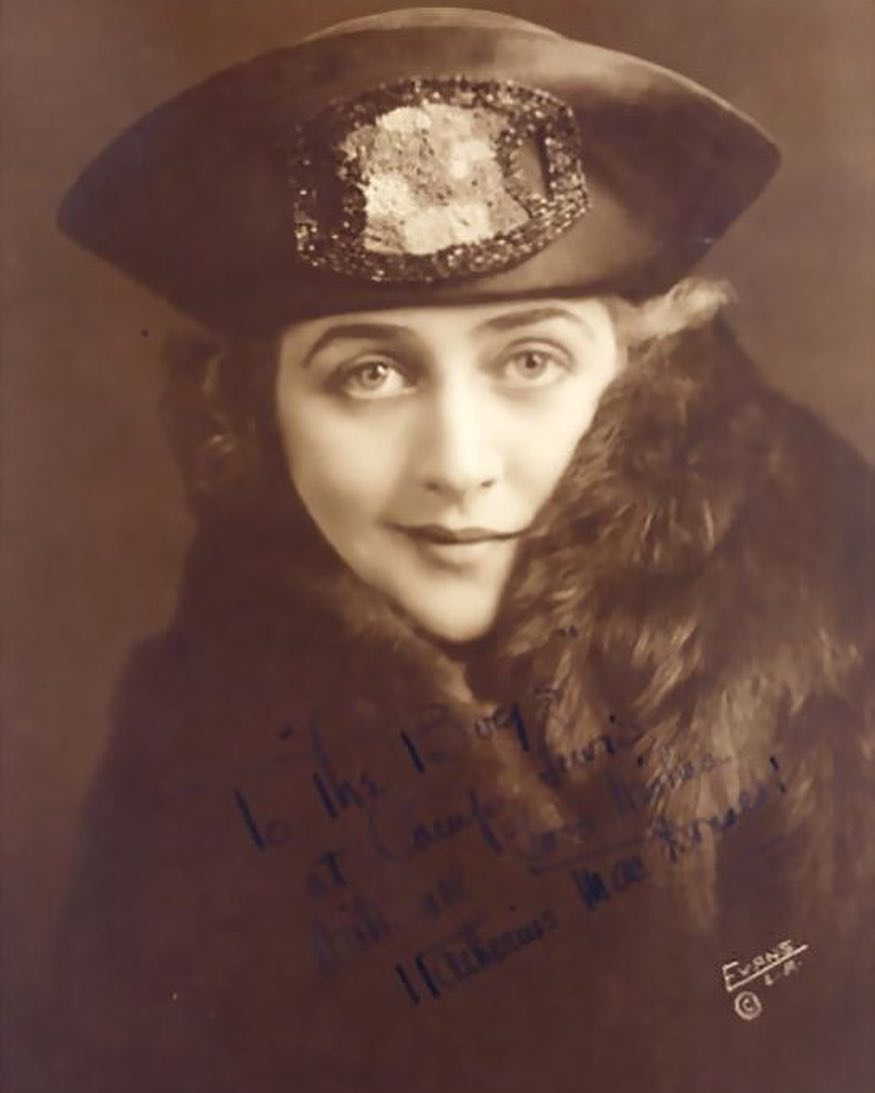
- MacDonald, c. 1922
- Born: Katherine Agnew MacDonald; December 14, 1891; Pittsburgh, Pennsylvania, U.S.
- Died: June 4, 1956 (aged 64); Santa Barbara, California, U.S.
- Occupation(s): Actress, film producer, model
- Spouse(s): Malcolm A. Strauss (m. 1911; div. 1919); Charles Schoen Johnson (m. 1923; div. 1926); 1 son Christian R. Holmes (m. 1928; div. 1931); 1 daughter
- Children: 2
- Relatives: Mary MacLaren (sister, actress)
- Awards: Hollywood Walk of Fame

Katherine Agnew MacDonald (December 14, 1891 – June 4, 1956) was an American stage and film actress, film producer, and model. She was born in Pittsburgh, Pennsylvania and was the older sister of actresses Miriam MacDonald and Mary MacLaren.

== Career ==
Starting her career as a popular model in New York City in the 1910s, MacDonald moved to Los Angeles in 1917. She became one of the first women to produce films in Hollywood, and produced nine features for her company, Katherine MacDonald Pictures, from 1919 to 1921.

MacDonald was among the top ranks of actresses financially in 1920, earning about $50,000 per picture from a contract with First National. She achieved the peak of her popularity between 1920 and 1923. From 1922 to 1925 she appeared in films produced by B. P. Schulberg.

She was considered a minor talent in the film industry, but her curvaceous figure nevertheless resulted in the nickname given her of the "American Beauty".

Her first significant role was her lead role in Shark Monroe (1918) opposite William S. Hart. She was featured in a number of silent films, including The Squaw Man (1918), Mr. Fix-It (1918), Passion's Playground (1920) and The Infidel (1922). Her films typically were romantic dramas. MacDonald made only two pictures after 1923, one each in 1925 and 1926.

== Personal life ==
While working as a model in New York City, Katherine met her first husband, the well-known artist and writer Malcolm Atherton Strauss. They married in New York in June 1911, but the union ended after eight years. In its May 17, 1919 issue, the New York-based trade journal Motion Picture World tersely announces, "Katherine MacDonald Strauss has been granted a decree of divorce by Judge Crail, of Los Angeles, from Malcolm A. Strauss, New York artist." Four years later in Atlantic City, New Jersey, she married Charles Schoen Johnson, a young Chicago millionaire. That marriage also ended in divorce in 1926 but produced one son, Britt.

After retiring from the movie industry MacDonald ran a successful cosmetics business in the late 1920s and early 1930s. In 1928 she married Christian Rasmus Holmes (1898-1944), an heir to the Fleischmann's yeast company, but that marriage ended in a sensational divorce suit in 1931, one widely covered in the press. MacDonald claimed cruelty, alleging that her husband had fired a revolver at her through a locked door, had deliberately burnt her with lit cigarettes, and had sometimes locked her in a cage. Holmes counter-sued, claiming that MacDonald had embarrassed him by having affairs. MacDonald and Holmes had one daughter, Ann.

== Death ==
MacDonald later in life suffered from diabetes, which in 1954 finally required the amputation of her right leg. Two years later, after a series of debilitating strokes, she died at St. Francis Hospital in Santa Barbara, California. She is buried in the Santa Barbara Cemetery in California.

== Filmography ==
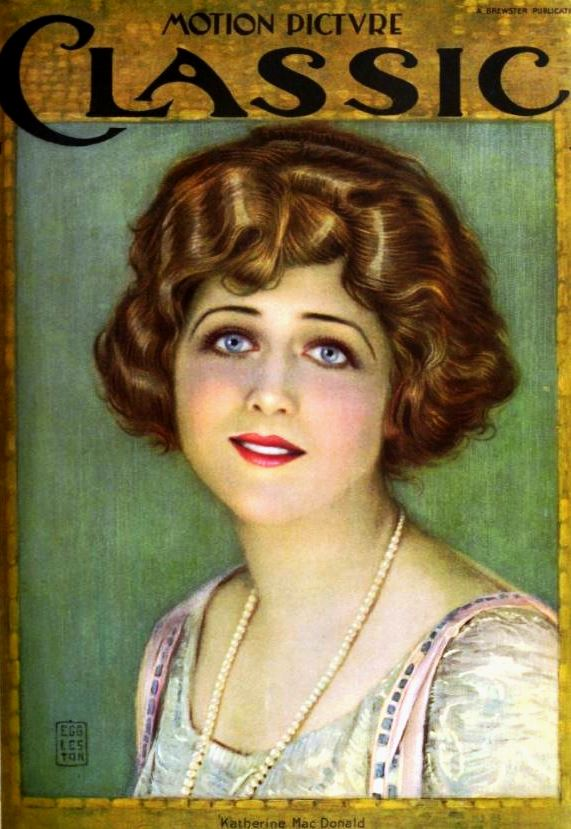
MacDonald on the cover of the Motion Picture Classic, July 23, 1921. Cover art by Benjamin Eggleston (1867-1937).

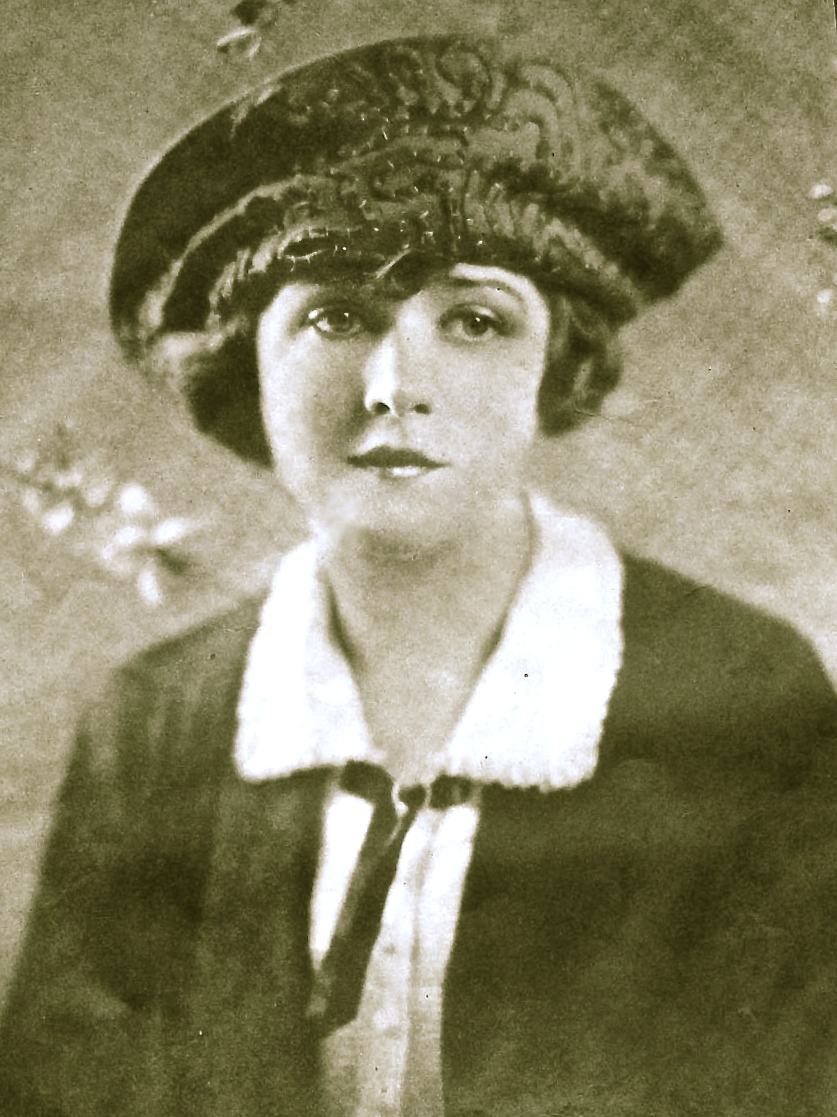
Another portrait of MacDonald featured in the January 1922 issue of Filmplay Journal

- The Spirit of '17 (1918) Lost
- Headin' South (1918) Lost
- Mr. Fix-It (1918) Surviving
- His Own Home Town (1918) Lost
- Shark Monroe (1918) Surviving
- Riddle Gawne (1918) Incomplete
- Battling Jane (1918) Lost
- The Squaw Man (1918) Incomplete
- Speedy Meade (1919) Lost
- The Woman Thou Gavest Me (1919) Lost
- High Pockets (1919) Surviving
- The Thunderbolt (1919) Lost
- The Beauty Market (1919) Lost
- The Turning Point (1920) Lost
- Passion's Playground (1920) Lost
- The Notorious Miss Lisle (1920) Lost
- Curtain (1920) Lost
- My Lady's Latchkey (1921) Lost
- Stranger Than Fiction (1921) Lost
- Her Social Value (1921) Lost
- The Beautiful Liar (1921) Lost
- The Woman's Side (1922) Lost
- The Infidel (1922) Lost
- Domestic Relations (1922)Lost
- Heroes and Husbands (1922) Lost
- White Shoulders (1922) Lost
- The Woman Conquers (1922) Lost
- Money! Money! Money! (1923) Lost
- Refuge (1923) Lost
- The Lonely Road (1923) Lost
- The Scarlet Lily (1923) Lost
- Chastity (1923) Lost
- Trust Your Wife (1924) Lost
- The Unnamed Woman (1925) Lost
- Old Loves and New (1926) Lost
