= Brown University in popular culture =

Brown University is a private research university in Providence, Rhode Island. Like other members of the Ivy League, it is known for prestige, academic rigor and selective undergraduate admissions process. Among its peers, Brown is noted for a culture of campus activism and longstanding commitment to academic and intellectual freedom exemplified by its Open Curriculum and course "shopping period." The university has been described as the "progressive Ivy," "hip Ivy," and "creative Ivy."

Brown is consistently referenced in popular culture, including in works of cinema, television, music, and the written word.

== Faculty ==
Josiah Carberry – Professor of Psychoceramics (the study of cracked pots), who was created as a joke in 1929 and who has become a tradition at Brown. On every Friday the 13th, cracked pots are left around the Brown campus for students to deposit their pocket change. The money goes to support the Brown University library. Traditionally, Brown alums everywhere send their pocket change to the library on Friday the 13th. There is an organization of alums called "Friends of Josiah" that meets for dinner on the Brown campus on Friday the 13th.

== Literature ==
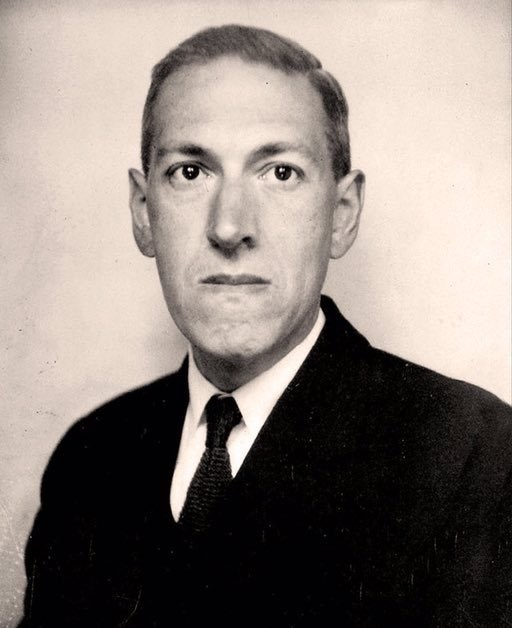
- H. P. Lovecraft fictional Miskatonic University may have been modeled off of Brown
  Eric van der Woodsen – in the book series Gossip Girl written by Cecily von Ziegesar, Eric is a student at Brown University.
- In Hannah Lillith Assadi's novel Sonora, the protagonist's unnamed manager, drops out of Brown
- Andrea Sachs – The main character in the 2003 novel The Devil Wears Prada by Lauren Weisberger.
- Jeffrey Eugenides's 2011 novel The Marriage Plot centers on the lives of three Brown students
- The 1924 novel The Plastic Age by Brown professor Percy Marks depicted a thinly disguised version of Brown. The novel depicted or suggested a campus of hazing, smoking, drinking, partying, and "petting." The book was the second best-selling novel of 1924, and turned into a film of the same name.
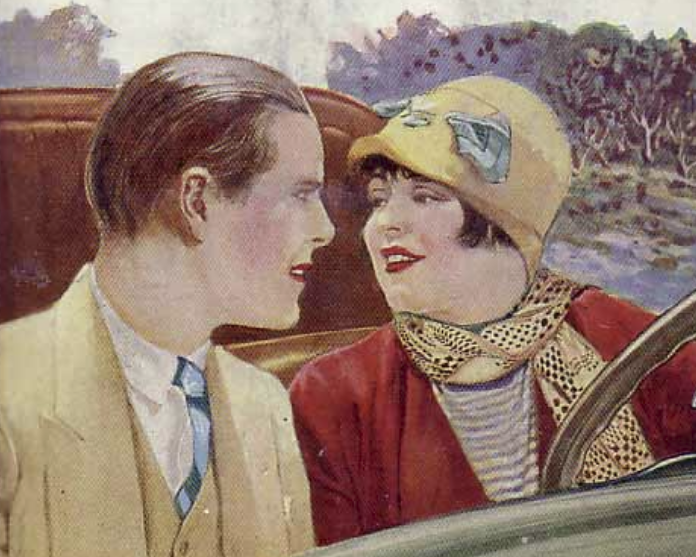
  The 1924 novel The Plastic Age is set at a university widely believed to be a stand-in for Brown
- Marina Thwaite, Danielle Minkoff and Julian Clarke, characters from Claire Messud's 2006 novel The Emperor's Children, were all friends at Brown University.
- In Akhil Sharma's 2014 novel Family Life, the narrator, Ajay, is rejected from Brown
- David Foster Wallace's novel Infinite Jest includes a description of a ludicrously botched attempt to fix a Brown–Yale basketball game, which has consequences for main character Don Gately. The character Geoffrey Day graduated magna cum laude from Brown, where he experienced an episode of depression in his second year.
- In H. P. Lovecraft's short story ''The Call of Cthulhu" (1926), the narrator, Francis Wayland Thurston, writes that his grandfather, George Gammell Angell, was "Professor Emeritus of Semitic Languages in Brown University, Providence, Rhode Island."

== Film and television ==
- Nathan Huffner (Rick Moranis) wears a Brown University T-shirt in the 1989 movie Parenthood
- The Sopranos: Season 2 episode "The Happy Wanderer" begins with a Brown admission officer's visit to Meadow's high school; he notes that "admission is extremely selective"
- Sean Alvarez (played by Andre DaSilva), honest stock broker and murder victim on Law & Order, 2000 episode "Trade This" (season 11), produced by Jeffrey L. Hayes, Brown '66.
- Sabrina Anderson / Sabrina Jordan (played by Spencer Locke) – young woman held hostage during a robbery who, as a result, must enter witness protection and will not be able to go to Brown where her old friends will recognize her, on In Plain Sight – 2010 (season 3) episode "WitSec Stepmother"
- Sam Arsenault (played by James Naughton, Brown '67) – guest villain on Damages (2006–7). In one episode, he sings Danny Boy at a cocktail party, telling the guests he sang it with the Jabberwocks when he was an undergraduate student at Brown. Jim was, in fact, a member of the Jabberwocks when he was an undergraduate at Brown.
- Ann August (played by Natalie Portman) – central character in Anywhere but Here; daughter of Adele August (played by Susan Sarandon). Ann applies and is accepted to Brown, much to her mother's dismay over the distance.
- Guinevere Beck (played by Elizabeth Lail) – Central character on You, an MFA student who went to Brown for her undergraduate education
- In BoJack Horseman season 2, film director Kelsey Jannings is quoted as saying, of her daughter Irving: "Indie darling daughters don’t go to Brown, okay? They end up at cute, little pat-on-the-back factories like Vassar, and then they move back in with their indie darling mothers and make weird puppet shows with their tampons and get a profile in New York Magazine, and the horrible cycle continues."
- Carrie Bradshaw (played by Sarah Jessica Parker) – lead character of the HBO romantic sitcom Sex and the City
- Cliff Calley (played by Mark Feuerstein) – Senate Majority Counsel on The West Wing.
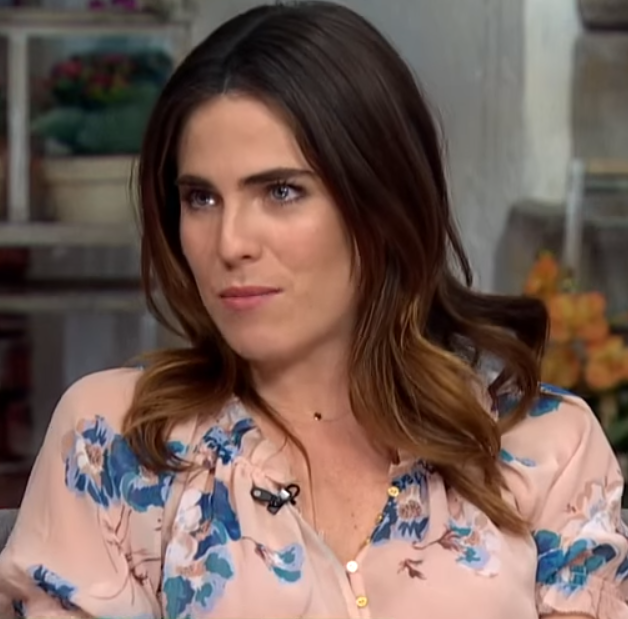
- In How to Get Away with Murder, Laurel Castillo holds a degree from Brown
  Laurel Castillo (played by Karla Souza) – law student on How to Get Away with Murder.
- Clippy – Microsoft Office Assistant represented as an animated paperclip, who, according to his résumé, has a degree in art–semiotics from Brown, where he "graduated cum laude with a performing arts thesis that involved twisting myself into a representation of Michelangelo's David"
- Laura Donnellon (played by Tracy Lynn Middendorf) – guest drug addict who drops out of Brown on The Guardian, episode "Hazel Park", in 2003
- Andrew Garner / Lash (played by Blair Underwood) – psychologist, husband of Melinda May; becomes Lash on Marvel's Agents of S.H.I.E.L.D. Garner is seen to have received his PhD at Brown in the episode "Chaos Theory".
- Amy Gardner (played by Mary-Louise Parker) – women's rights activist and later Chief of Staff to the First Lady Abbey Bartlet in the television series The West Wing. Gardner was asked by the First Lady where she got "such a smart mouth", to which Gardner quickly replied "Brown."
- Brian Griffin (voiced by Seth MacFarlane) – erudite, alcoholic dog from the animated television series Family Guy; dropped out one class short of graduating; re-enrolls and fails in the episode "Brian Goes Back to College". During the episode, Stewie Griffin (also voiced by MacFarlane) lives in the dorm with Brian.
- Joy – the wealthy nomad Don Draper meets in Mad Men: "The Jet Set" (season 2, episode 11) took a literature survey course at Pembroke College
- Lucy Kelson (played by Sandra Bullock) – protagonist of Two Weeks Notice is a liberal lawyer who specializes in environmental law in New York City and is hired by an immature billionaire who needs a Chief Counsel who not only will file briefs but help with every little aspect of his life. She and Meryl Brooks (played by Heather Burns) have known each other since "Brownie days."
- Nick Mercer (played by Dermot Mulroney) – male escort hired by Kat Ellis (played by Debra Messing) to be her date to her sister's wedding in the film The Wedding Date; Mercer graduated from Brown with a degree in Comparative Literature
- Otto Mann (voiced by Harry Shearer) – bus driver from the animated television series The Simpsons, who claims to have almost received tenure as a professor at Brown in one of Lisa Simpson's dream sequences
- Imani Morehouse (played by Nicole Beharie) – district attorney on The Good Wife
- Jack Morgan – lead detective in the Private detective series written by James Patterson and Maxine Paetro.
- Jonathan "Mox" Moxon (played by James Van Der Beek) – main character of the film Varsity Blues; this tormented replacement quarterback for his small-town Texas high school football team must devote himself to football and become a hero; receives acceptance to Brown, but his coach blackmails him to play football by threatening to ruin his transcript
- Michael O'Neal (played by Dermot Mulroney) – main character of the film My Best Friend's Wedding
- Julianne Potter (played by Julia Roberts) – main character of the film My Best Friend's Wedding and her "best friend" Michael O'Neal (played by Dermot Mulroney), who met and made their marriage pact while attending Brown
- Audrey Raines (played by Kim Raver) – Jack Bauer's lover and Inter-Agency Liaison in the U.S. Department of Defense in the television series 24; earned an A.M. in public policy from Brown
- Elliot Reid in the television series Scrubs; revealed in the episode "My Turf War" that she and her sorority sister Melody O'Hara attended Brown
- Monica Reyes (played by Annabeth Gish) – FBI Special agent in the television series The X-Files, who studied folklore and mythology at Brown
- Andrea Sachs – The main character in the 2003 novel The Devil Wears Prada by Lauren Weisberger. However, in the film version, Sachs is a graduate of Northwestern University.
- Ryder Smith (played by George Hamilton) – leading man in Where the Boys Are a 1960 movie about spring break in Ft Lauderdale, shown during exam week on the Brown campus.
- Jessica Stein (played by Jennifer Westfeldt) – titular character of the film Kissing Jessica Stein
- Eileen Stevens – mom on Even Stevens
- Jaye Tyler (played by Caroline Dhavernas) – snarky souvenir store clerk and main character of the television series Wonderfalls, who studied philosophy at Brown
- Bridget "Bee" Vreeland – from the novel series Sisterhood of the Traveling Pants
- Bill Wentz (played by Jack Noseworthy) – U.S. Navy radioman in the film U-571, who studied German at Brown
- Seth Cohen (played by Adam Brody) and his girlfriend Summer Roberts (played by Rachel Bilson) – in the television series The O.C. both applied to Brown and had interviews with the admissions officer from Brown. In a few episodes, both were seen competing to gain more extracurricular activities to add to their C.V. hopefully to increase their chances to Brown. Ultimately however, Seth was rejected and Summer was accepted. Summer enrolls but is suspended for one year following her first semester after she freed rabbits in a science laboratory, and fellow student Winchester "Che" Cook (Chris Pratt) falsely accused her of other acts. Summer eventually returned to Brown and graduated.
- Linda (played by Marisa Tomei) and Andrew (played by Allen Covert) are Brown alums in the movie Anger Management. Linda is Adam Sandler's girlfriend, and Andrew has been Linda's best friend since they dated at Brown. Andrew emasculates Sandler by forcing him to admit that he attended Trenton Community College, asking "where did you go to school again?" In another scene, Andrew tells Linda that "I rented out the entire sports bar. I thought it would be fun if it was just us Brown alums." He also tries to drum up their old romance by saying, "Do you remember back at Brown when we went up to see the Red Sox game?" In the movie, Sandler describes a Red Sox bra as "represent[ing] everything that I hate." Jack Nicholson, whose character went to Columbia University, reinforces the New York v. New England/Brown motif when he tells Sandler "Andrew is gonna try and recreate those hotsy-totsy nights up at Brown U."
- As Good as It Gets – Jack Nicholson's publicist mentions her son got into Brown. Nicholson is indifferent because he has an antisocial personality.
- Bill Buchanan from the TV series 24 has an English degree from Brown.
- In the CW TV show Gossip Girl episode "Poison Ivy", Serena van der Woodsen's (Blake Lively) mother attended Brown University. Her father went to Harvard University. Serena herself applies and is accepted to Brown, though she ultimately does not attend.
- Christine Everhart (played by Leslie Bibb), 2008 Iron Man film: a Vanity Fair columnist who questions and interrogates Stark about his weapons industry, claiming that his company is killing people. Stark asks if she attended Berkeley, but she corrects him and says "Brown, actually." Later, she appears again, to tell Stark of the Ten Rings in Gulmira and at the end, suspecting Stark of being Iron Man.
- In Hamlet 2, the main character, a drama teacher, assumes a Latino student is a gangster. In actuality, his father is an accomplished author and he gained early admission to Brown.
- Nora Clark (played by Jenna Dewan) – in the movie Step Up, Nora reveals to Tyler Gage (played by Channing Tatum) that she had been accepted to Brown University, but tells him she does not want to go and wants to pursue her passion for dancing instead.
- Nell Kellner (played by Tricia Vessey) – in the movie Coming Soon, Nell gets accepted to Brown University at the end of the film when she reveals that her father had donated a large sum of money to the school.
- Donna Keppel (played by Brittany Snow) – protagonist of the movie Prom Night was accepted to Brown, but has doubts of going because of being separated from her boyfriend.
- Norah Silverberg (played by Kat Dennings) – female protagonist and love interest of Nick O'Leary (played by Michael Cera) in the movie Nick and Norah's Infinite Playlist; she tells Nick she was accepted to Brown University.
- Courtney, April and Monica – in the movie Ninja Cheerleaders, Courtney (played by Trishelle Cannatella), April (played by Ginny Weirick) and Monica (played by Maitland McConnell) get accepted to Brown and attend the school at the end of the film.
- Jane Weston (played by Amy Smart) – in the movie Outside Providence, Jane gets accepted to Brown University and attends the school at the end of the film.
- Nick Lipton (played by Zach Braff, making his feature film debut) in the movie Manhattan Murder Mystery, is the son of protagonists Larry Lipton (played by Woody Allen) and Carol Lipton (played by Diane Keaton), and makes a brief appearance when he visits his parents over a college break.
- Sophie Hall (played by Amanda Seyfried) – in the movie Letters to Juliet, Sophie tells Charlie Wyman, played by Chris Egan, that she went to Brown and she double majored with a minor in Latin (Brown does not offer minors, only concentrations).
- Turanga Munda, the mother of the character Turanga Leela in Futurama, has a degree in exolinguistics from Brown In the episode Zapp Dingbat, it was stated that Leela's father Morris also attended the university.
- In a Foghorn Leghorn cartoon "Raw! Raw! Rooster!", a character named Rhode Island Red sings, "Who got kicked from Harvard, Princeton, Yale, and Brown?"
- In The Skinny, four Black gay males meet up again in New York City. All are graduates of Brown University. The film was directed by Patrick-Ian Polk.
- Clay Jensen (played by Dylan Minnette) – in the teen drama web television 13 Reasons Why Season 4, Clay had interviews with the admissions officer from Brown and was accepted. He will go to Brown university after graduating from Liberty High School.
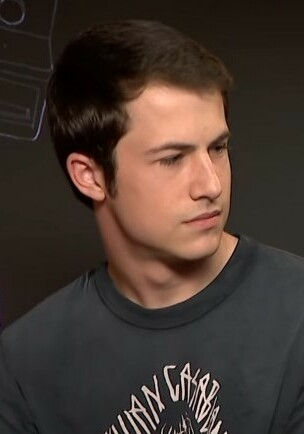
  Clay Jensen in 13 Reasons Why plans to attend Brown after graduating from high school
- In "Endless Love", the character Jade Butterfield, plans on attending Brown. It is also assumed that her late brother, Christopher, did as well.
- Bill Kincaid (played by Edward Norton) in Leaves of Grass is a classics professor at Brown.
- Meg Griffin (voiced by Mila Kunis), a character in Family Guy, gets expelled from Brown University after it is discovered her application was forged, in the episode Meg Goes to College
- Max Goodwin (played by Ryan Eggold) in the television series New Amsterdam, is a Brown alum. After disparaging members of the hospital's board for going to Harvard, another character asks where he went to school. He says he attended Brown, but quickly defends it as the "liberal Ivy." He also wears a Brown sweatshirt on multiple occasions throughout the series.
- Shauna Shipman (Sophie Nélisse and Melanie Lynskey) in Yellowjackets; Shauna was set to attend Brown under their Early Decision program before getting involved in a plane crash that leaves her stranded in the wilderness.
- Felicity Lynn (Aimee Carrero) in The Menu; Hoping to be spared by Ralph Fiennes's Chef Slowik's murderous plan in Hawthorn, Felicity tearfully revealed that she went to Brown, but admitted that she went there without student loan. Therefore, she stays becoming one of his victims without a chance to escape.
- Noah Werner (Alan Tudyk) is an alum of Brown University in the 2011 ABC American television sitcom Suburgatory. He has his own dentistry practice in fictional Chatswin, NY and is shown wearing a Brown Bears shirt. He is college friends with main character George Altman and his daughter Jenna Werner, played by Courtney Merritt, also attends Brown.

== Music ==
- In the song Some Other Me from the musical If/Then, Elizabeth sings "And I didn't go to Vassar, but to Smith, or Yale, or Brown"
- In his 2021 charity single American Dream, Will.i.am sings "Yeah, they call me a dreamer / But now I'm going to Brown University"

== Other ==
- The 2012 visual novel Katawa Shoujo takes place at the fictional Yamaku Academy, the design of which is directly taken from Brown University.
