= Plastic Age =

Plastic Age may refer to:

- The Plastic Age, 1924 novel
  - The Plastic Age (film), 1925 silent movie based on that novel
- The Age of Plastic, 1979-80 synthpop album by The Buggles
  - "Living in the Plastic Age" (also known simply as "The Plastic Age"), title track from that album
- In the sense of an archaeological age, like the last of the metal ages the iron age, being one marker of the suggested anthropocene.
