= The Country Beyond =

The Country Beyond may refer to:

- The Country Beyond (1926 film), American drama directed by Irving Cummings
- The Country Beyond (1936 film), American drama directed by Eugene Forde
