= Frederica Sagor Maas =

American playwright, screenwriter and memoirist (1900–2012)

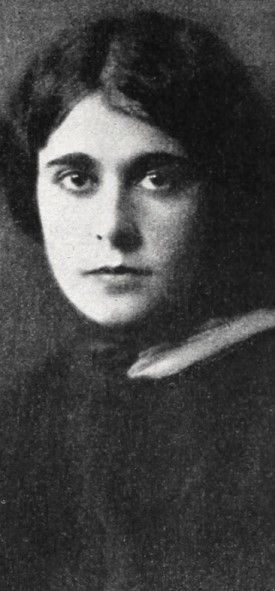
- Photograph from a 1925 magazine
- Born: Frederica Alexandrina Sagor; July 6, 1900; New York City, U.S.
- Died: January 5, 2012 (aged 111 years, 183 days); La Mesa, California, U.S.
- Occupations: screenwriter; playwright; memoirist; author
- Years active: 1918–1954
- Spouse: Ernest Maas (m. 1927; died 1986)

Frederica Alexandrina Sagor Maas (/ˌfrɛdəˈrikə səˈɡɔːr mæs/; July 6, 1900 – January 5, 2012) was an American screenwriter, playwright, supercentenarian, memoirist and author, the youngest daughter of Jewish immigrants from Russia. As an essayist, Maas was best known for a detailed, tell-all memoir of her time spent in early Hollywood. A supercentenarian, she was one of the oldest surviving entertainers from the silent film era.

== Background ==
Maas's parents, Arnold and Agnessa (née Litvinova) Zagorsky, Jewish immigrants from Moscow, Russian Empire, and anglicized their surname to Sagor. Her mother supported the family as a very successful midwife. One of four daughters, Sagor was born on July 6, 1900, in a cold-water, railroad flat on 101st Street near Madison Avenue in Manhattan.

She studied journalism at Columbia University and held a summer job as a copy- or errand-girl at The New York Globe newspaper. She dropped out before graduation in 1918 and took a job as an assistant story editor at Universal Pictures' New York office at $100 a week. By 1923, Maas was story editor for Universal and head of the department. A year later in 1924, Maas had become dissatisfied with her position and she left Universal to move to Hollywood.

== Hollywood years ==
Once in Hollywood, Maas negotiated a contract with Preferred Pictures to adapt Percy Marks's novel The Plastic Age for film. Based on this, she was signed to a three-year contract with MGM for $350 per week, though in her words: "I had the peculiar feeling that wily Louis B. [Mayer] was less interested in my writing ability than in signing someone who had worked for Ben Schulberg and Al Lichtman." It was in this period that she wrote the screenplays for silent films Dance Madness and The Waning Sex.

Her recollections of that period:

I wrote a movie called The Waning Sex. It was a title I was given and we wrote the title around it. I got into a lot of fights with the co-writer on the film, F. Hugh Herbert. It was rough. I would work so hard on some of the scripts and the minute I'd turn it in, someone else would take credit for it. You'd be ticketed as a troublemaker. Unless you wanted to quit the business, you just kept your mouth shut.

Thus Maas' introduction to studio politics did not go well and her MGM contract was not renewed. During 1925–1926 she wrote treatments and screenplays for Tiffany Productions, including the well-received flapper comedies That Model from Paris and The First Night.

Already before she married Ernest Maas, a screenwriter and producer at Fox Studios, on August 5, 1927, they sold story ideas such as Silk Legs to studios. Many of these would never be filmed; "swell fish" was their term for screenplays that would remain unproduced. During 1927, Schulberg, this time with Paramount Pictures, contracted Sagor for a year and she says she worked uncredited on scripts such as Clara Bow's It, Red Hair and Hula; and credited for writing the story for Louise Brooks' lost film Rolled Stockings. Regarding It, which was produced between October 7 and November 6, 1926, i.e. before Sagor signed up for Paramount, her claim is conflicting.

An unusually long European vacation in the summer of 1928 made finding steady studio work difficult upon her return. Ernest remained with Paramount Short Subjects division in New York. When a story by the Maas couple titled Beefsteak Joe was misappropriated and filmed as The Way of All Flesh he left the studio. The couple returned to unsteady work in California in October 1929. According to her memoirs, "[b]y the fall of 1934, it was plain that we were not a success in Hollywood. In these five years we only found work doing short studio assignments – cleaning up other people's scripts – and had failed to sell our own stories."

The couple had lost $10,000 in the stock market crash and moved back to New York. From 1934 to 1937, they reviewed plays for The Hollywood Reporter. Another relocation back to Hollywood had Maas representing writers and selling story material for the Edward Small Agency; Maas plied every studio every day with her wares. After a year as an agent, the Maas couple secured writing contracts at Paramount to cull previously purchased material.

== Post-Hollywood ==
The war years found the couple back seeking unsteady work and writing for political campaigns. It was in 1941 that they wrote Miss Pilgrim's Progress, the story that would become The Shocking Miss Pilgrim. Bad representation caused the story to sell for a pittance, and it would not be produced until 1947 when it was rendered almost unrecognizable in an adaptation by Darryl F. Zanuck's 20th Century Fox for Betty Grable.

The Maas couple continued to live a hand-to-mouth existence struggling in Hollywood. During this time they were even interrogated by the FBI for having subscribed to two allegedly Communist publications. "I'm something of a Bolshevik. I'm always for the underdog … I remember when I was 17 or 18, marching in a New York parade, right before women got the vote. I marched in the schoolteacher segment, because my sister was a schoolteacher. I remember we held hands, and I remember how I felt. My God, I thought I was revolutionizing the world."

Having had enough "swell fish", Frederica Sagor Maas took a job as a policy typist with an insurance agency in 1950, quickly working her way up to insurance broker. Ernest took up ghost writing professional business articles and freelance story editing. Ernest succumbed to Parkinson's disease in 1986, at the age of 94.

== Autobiography ==
In 1999, aged 99, and at the urging of film historian Kevin Brownlow, Maas published her autobiography, titled The Shocking Miss Pilgrim: A Writer in Early Hollywood. The book was well received and is still a standard reference for early Hollywood history.

From the Library Journal:

Maas's chronicle of her writing career, which spanned over a quarter of a century, is a valuable contribution to the literature on women in Hollywood ... Rejecting studio politics, Maas ultimately paid the price for playing maverick. Peppered with fascinating anecdotes from yesteryear, this account of the author's life bespeaks frustration with the vapidity of Hollywood: a fickle business world that relied on formula for its success.

From Kevin Brownlow:

(she) proved so "ignorant of studio politics" that she was labeled a "troublemaker" by producer Harry Rapf. After her 1927 marriage to script writer and producer Ernest Maas, the couple survived the coming of sound films, the Depression and various earthquakes, but dry scripting spells and the constant theft of their ideas, stories and credits led them to quit the business. In 1950 she "bid farewell, without tears, to the Hollywood screen industry that had so entangled and entrapped me in its web of promises." Maas trashes Hollywood legends, recalling Louis B. Mayer as "a very fearful, insecure man"; Clara Bow dancing nude on a tabletop; Jeanne Eagels squatting to urinate in the midst of a film set ...

There are also her detractors:

Her story has to be taken with a grain of salt. By the time she wrote her memoirs at 99 her bitterness with Hollywood was deep and she particularly relished describing the bosses with whom she so frequently battled as amoral debauchers.

In her own defense:

I know I've been hard on the motion picture industry [in the book] ... [T]he facts and the stories I tell – about the plagiarism and the way I was handled and the way other writers were handled – are true. If anybody wants to take offense at the fact that I tell the truth and I'm writing this book ... [I] can get my payback now. I'm alive and thriving and, well, you SOBs are all below, because I've lived to 99. And I quit the business at 50.

== Filmography ==
- The Shocking Miss Pilgrim (1947) (story)
- Piernas de Seda (1935) (story 'Silk Legs')
- The Farmer's Daughter (1928)
- Red Hair (1928) (uncredited)
- Hula (1927) (uncredited)
- Silk Legs (1927)
- The Way of All Flesh (1927)
- Rolled Stockings (1927)
- The First Night (1927)
- Flesh and the Devil (1926)
- That Model from Paris (1926)
- The Waning Sex (1926)
- Dance Madness (1926)
- The Plastic Age (1925)
- His Secretary (1925)
- The Goose Woman (1925)

== Bibliography ==
- Maas, Frederica Sagor (1999). The Shocking Miss Pilgrim: A Writer in Early Hollywood. Lexington, Kentucky: University Press of Kentucky. ISBN 0-8131-2122-1.

== See also ==
- List of centenarians (actors, filmmakers and entertainers)
