= That Model from Paris =

1926 film

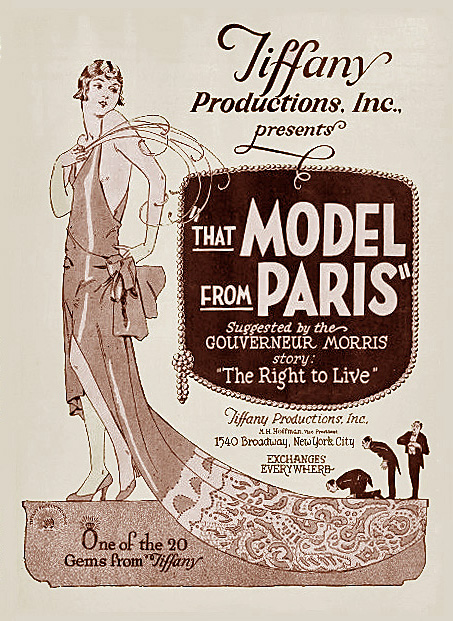
- Directed by: Louis J. Gasnier
- Written by: Frederica Sagor Maas
- Story by: Gouverneur Morris
- Starring: Marceline Day; Bert Lytell; Eileen Percy
- Cinematography: Milton Moore; Mack Stengler
- Edited by: James C. McKay
- Production company: Tiffany Pictures
- Distributed by: Tiffany Pictures
- Release date: October 15, 1926
- Running time: 70 minutes
- Country: United States
- Language: Silent (English intertitles)

That Model from Paris is a 1926 American silent comedy film directed by Louis J. Gasnier and starring Marceline Day, Bert Lytell, and Eileen Percy.

== Synopsis ==
A shy young woman is persuaded to dress up and pretend to be a French model for a fashion show, leading to complications.

== Cast ==
- Marceline Day as Jane Miller
- Bert Lytell as Robert Richmond
- Eileen Percy as Mamie
- Ward Crane as Morgan Grant
- Miss DuPont as Lila
- Arthur Hoyt as Modeling House Manager
- Crauford Kent as Henry Marsh
- Otto Lederer as Mr. Katz
- Nellie Bly Baker as Beautician
- George Kuwa as Grant's Valet

== Bibliography ==
- Munden, Kenneth White. The American Film Institute Catalog of Motion Pictures Produced in the United States, Part 1. University of California Press, 1997.
