= The Country Beyond (1926 film) =

1926 film

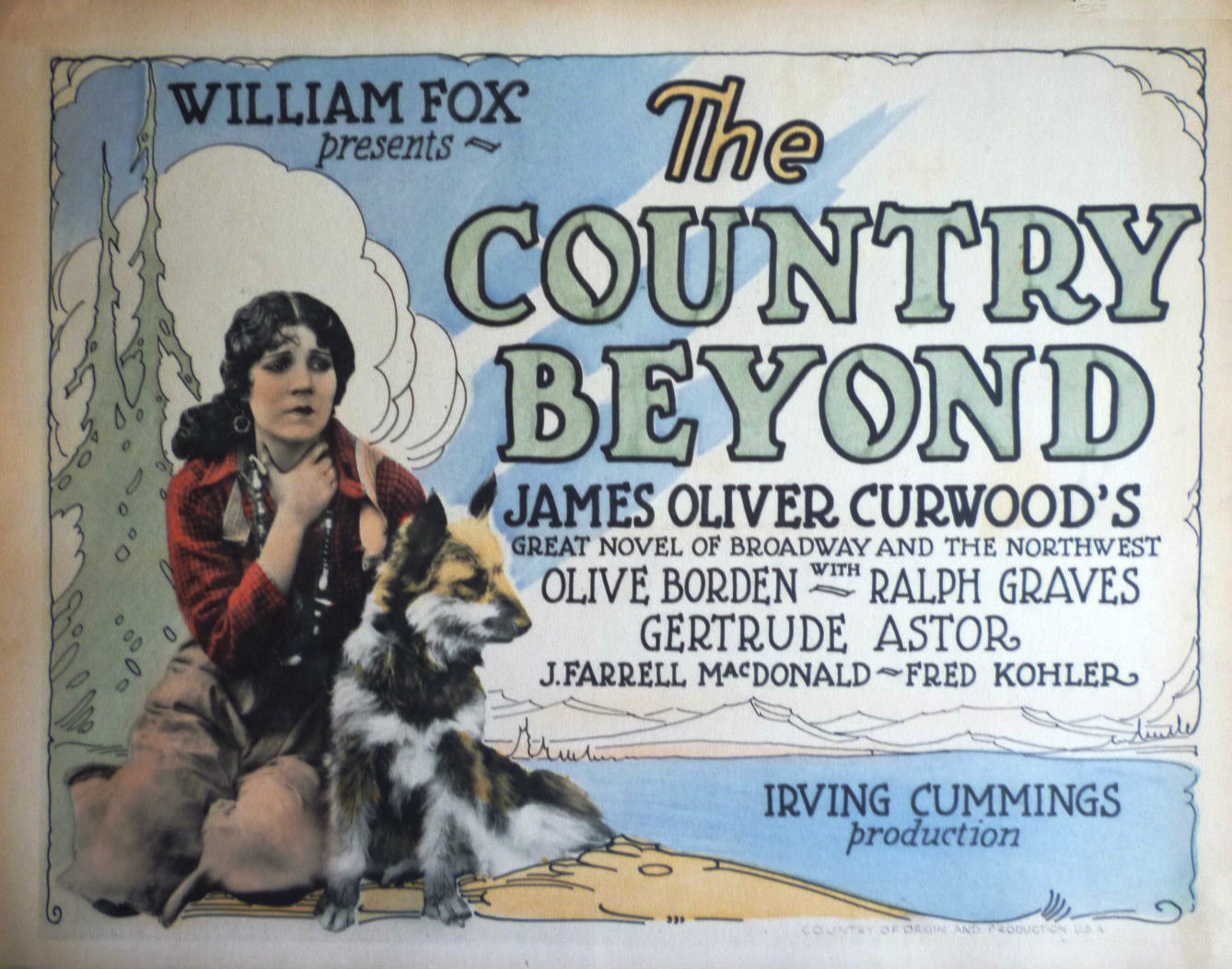
- Lobby card
- Directed by: Irving Cummings
- Screenplay by: Irving Cummings; Ernest Maas; H. H. Caldwell; Katherine Hilliker
- Based on: The Country Beyond by James Oliver Curwood
- Starring: Olive Borden; Ralph Graves; Gertrude Astor; J. Farrell MacDonald; Evelyn Selbie; Fred Kohler
- Cinematography: Conrad Wells
- Production company: Fox Film Corporation
- Distributed by: Fox Film Corporation
- Release date: October 17, 1926
- Running time: 60 minutes
- Country: United States
- Language: Silent (English intertitles)

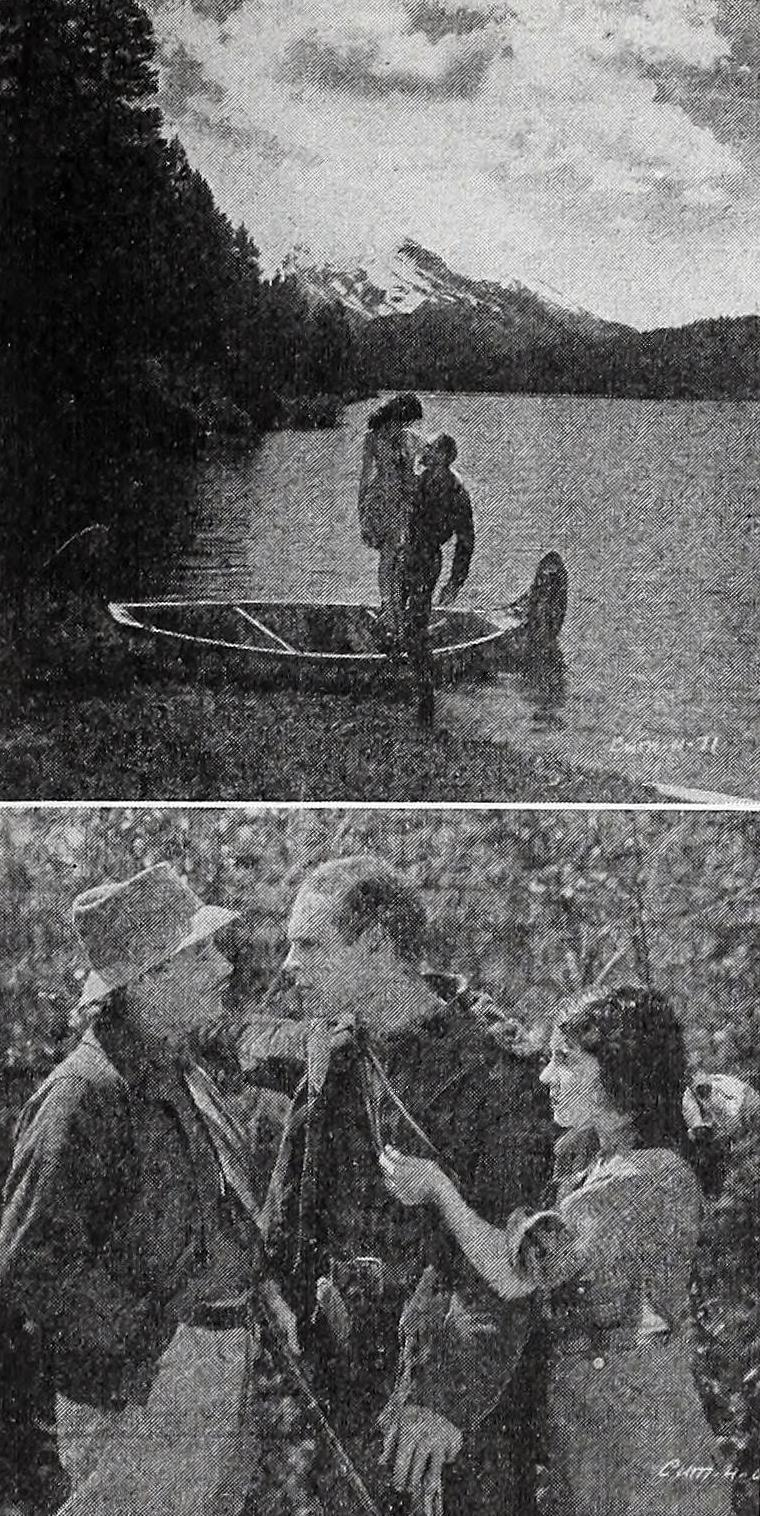
Scenes from the film

The Country Beyond is a 1926 American silent Western film, also classified as a Northern, directed by Irving Cummings and written by Irving Cummings, Ernest Maas, H. H. Caldwell and Katherine Hilliker. It is based on the 1922 novel The Country Beyond by James Oliver Curwood. The film stars Olive Borden, Ralph Graves, Gertrude Astor, J. Farrell MacDonald, Evelyn Selbie, and Fred Kohler. The film was released on October 17, 1926, by Fox Film Corporation.

== Plot ==
As described in a film magazine review, Valencia, a young Northwoods woman, falls in love with Roger McKay, a young trapper wanted by the police for robbery. Sgt. Cassidy, a happy-go-lucky Mountie, loathes the assignment of bringing in McKay because he knows that he is not a bad sort. Henry Harland, a theatrical producer, stopping at a summer hotel on the lake, sees Valencia and offers her a place in his show. To further his scheme, Harland forces Cassidy on McKay's trail. Meanwhile, Valencia, who lives with Martha and her good-for-nothing man Joe, is attacked by Joe when she tries to leave the house. Joe has sold her to a bully and is about to deliver Valencia to her new master when Martha kills Joe, allowing Valencia to escape. McKay discovers the murder and assumes the guilt of the crime as he believes Valencia did it. McKay is sentenced and Valencia, unaware of his plight, accepts the offer of Harland. Later Cassidy tracks her down, finding that she is now a famous actress, and tells her of about McKay and that he is now free. Valencia hastens back to see him and there is a happy reunion.

== Cast ==
- Olive Borden as Valencia
- Ralph Graves as Roger McKay
- Gertrude Astor as Mrs. Andrews
- J. Farrell MacDonald as Sgt. Cassidy
- Evelyn Selbie as Martha Leseur
- Fred Kohler as Joe Leseur
- Lawford Davidson as Henry Harland
- Alfred Fisher as Father John
- Lottie Williams as Valencia's Maid

== Preservation ==
With no prints of The Country Beyond located in any film archives, it is a lost film.
