= The Shocking Miss Pilgrim =

1947 film by George Seaton

- Theatrical release poster
- Directed by: George Seaton
- Screenplay by: George Seaton
- Story by: Ernest Maas; Frederica Sagor
- Produced by: William Perlberg
- Starring: Betty Grable; Dick Haymes; Anne Revere; Allyn Joslyn; Gene Lockhart; Elizabeth Patterson; Elisabeth Risdon; Arthur Shields; Charles Kemper; Roy Roberts
- Cinematography: Leon Shamroy
- Edited by: Robert L. Simpson
- Music by: Alfred Newman; David Raksin
- Production company: 20th Century Fox
- Distributed by: 20th Century Fox
- Release date: 4 January 1947
- Running time: 85 minutes
- Country: United States
- Language: English
- Budget: $2.6 million
- Box office: $2.2 million (US rentals)

The Shocking Miss Pilgrim is a 1947 American musical comedy film in Technicolor written and directed by George Seaton and starring Betty Grable and Dick Haymes.

The screenplay, based on a story by Ernest Maas and Frederica Maas, focuses on a young typist who becomes involved in the Women's Suffrage movement in 1874. The songs were written by George and Ira Gershwin.

== Plot ==
Cynthia Pilgrim is the top typewriting (i.e. typing) student of the first graduating class of the Packard Business College in New York City, and as such she is offered a position as a typewriter (i.e. typist) with the Pritchard Shipping Company in Boston. There, she finds an office of men overseen by office manager Mr. Saxon. When Cynthia introduces herself to company co-owner John Pritchard, he tells her he thought all expert typists were male and his policy is to hire only men. Cynthia asks for an opportunity to prove she is as efficient as her male counterparts, but John refuses and offers her train fare back to New York.

John's Aunt Alice, an avowed suffragist, has the controlling interest in the company and insists that Cynthia be given a chance. Cynthia finds lodgings at Catherine Dennison's boarding house, where she meets an eclectic group of tenants, including poet Leander Woolsey, artist Michael Michael, and musician Herbert Jothan.

John invites Cynthia to dinner, but she prefers not to socialize with her employer. She does allow him to escort her to one of his aunt's suffragist rallies, where she impresses the other women, despite John's standing up from the audience and asking her awkward questions about management and labor getting closer together. When John's mother asks her to dine with them on the evening of the Regimental Ball, Cynthia feels she would not fit in with the woman's social circle, so her rooming house companions coach her on how to behave unpleasantly, thinking the mother is a snob. Cynthia is delighted to discover their efforts were unnecessary, because Mrs. Pritchard proves to be down-to-earth and a supporter of Cynthia's desire to be treated equally in the workplace.

John begins to date Cynthia, and eventually they become engaged. He tries to persuade her to give up her involvement in the suffrage movement, but she insists she cannot abandon such a worthy cause. They break their engagement and she is fired from her job, but none of the people hired by Mr. Saxon to replace her please Mr. Pritchard. He and John go, in desperation, to a local school to find yet another candidate for the position. There, John discovers that its general manager is Cynthia, and the two are reunited in business as well as in love.

== Cast ==
- Betty Grable as Cynthia Pilgrim
- Dick Haymes as John Pritchard
- Anne Revere as Alice Pritchard
- Gene Lockhart as Mr. Saxon
- Elizabeth Patterson as Catherine Dennison
- Allyn Joslyn as Leander Woolsey
- Arthur Shields as Michael Michael
- Charles Kemper as Herbert Jothan
- Elisabeth Risdon as Mrs. Pritchard (John's mother)

== Production ==
In 1941, husband-and-wife screenwriting team Ernest Maas and Frederica Sagor collaborated on Miss Pilgrim's Progress, a story about a young woman who enters the business world by demonstrating the newly invented typewriter in the window of a Wall Street establishment. When she tries to fend off the unwanted advances of one of the firm's clerks, her employer comes to her rescue but is killed when he falls down the stairs in the ensuing altercation. Abigail Pilgrim becomes the focus of a murder trial that attracts widespread coverage by the media and the attention of Susan B. Anthony when the concept of women working in offices comes under fire.

Acting as their agent, Paul Kohner brought the story to several studios. RKO and MGM expressed some interest, but both eventually passed. 20th Century Fox finally purchased the screen rights, and initially planned on starring Jeanne Crain, but the project stalled. Finally, studio head Darryl F. Zanuck, searching for material for Betty Grable, decided to tailor it to her talents, cutting Crain loose. After it underwent several rewrites, Zanuck assigned the task of whipping the screenplay into shooting shape to George Seaton, who would also direct. Working with Kay Swift, Ira Gershwin sorted through songs he and his brother George had written but never used and selected eleven for the film's musical numbers. Frederica Sagor was unhappy with the tunes and later observed, "Not even if they had scraped the very bottom of the barrel could they have come up with something so unmelodious." Displeased with the treatment her and her husband's original story was given, she called the result "another stupid boy-meets-girl Zanuck travesty."

Despite Betty Grable's popularity as a top moneymaking film star at this time, The Shocking Miss Pilgrim was a box office disappointment.

== Song list ==
- Sweet Packard
  - Music by George Gershwin
  - Lyrics by Ira Gershwin
  - Performed by ensemble
- Changing My Tune
  - Music by George Gershwin
  - Lyrics by Ira Gershwin
  - Performed by Betty Grable
- Stand Up and Fight
  - Music by George Gershwin
  - Lyrics by Ira Gershwin
  - Performed by Anne Revere, Betty Grable, Dick Haymes and ensemble
- Aren't You Kinda Glad We Did?
  - Music by George Gershwin
  - Lyrics by Ira Gershwin
  - Performed by Dick Haymes and Betty Grable
- The Back Bay Polka
  - Music by George Gershwin
  - Lyrics by Ira Gershwin
  - Performed by Allyn Joslyn, Charles Kemper, Elizabeth Patterson, Lillian Bronson

Arthur Shields and Betty Grable

- One, Two, Three
  - Music by George Gershwin
  - Lyrics by Ira Gershwin
  - Performed by Dick Haymes and ensemble
  - Danced by Betty Grable and Dick Haymes
- Waltzing is Better Sitting Down
  - Music by George Gershwin
  - Lyrics by Ira Gershwin
  - Performed by Dick Haymes and Betty Grable
- Demon Rum
  - Music by George Gershwin
  - Lyrics by Ira Gershwin
  - Performed by ensemble
- For You, for Me, for Evermore
  - Music by George Gershwin
  - Lyrics by Ira Gershwin
  - Performed by Dick Haymes and Betty Grable

== Critical reception ==
Bosley Crowther of The New York Times felt in a few of the songs "a certain exuberance is momentarily achieved," but he thought "the bulk of the music is as sticky as toothpaste being squeezed out of a tube." He added, "Miss Grable and Mr. Haymes are neither given nor deserve a script if the caliber of their performances is a valid criterion, and several other minor actors behave ridiculously in silly roles. There is no more voltage in The Shocking Miss Pilgrim than in a badly used dry cell."
