= Red Hair (film) =

1928 film directed by Clarence G. Badger

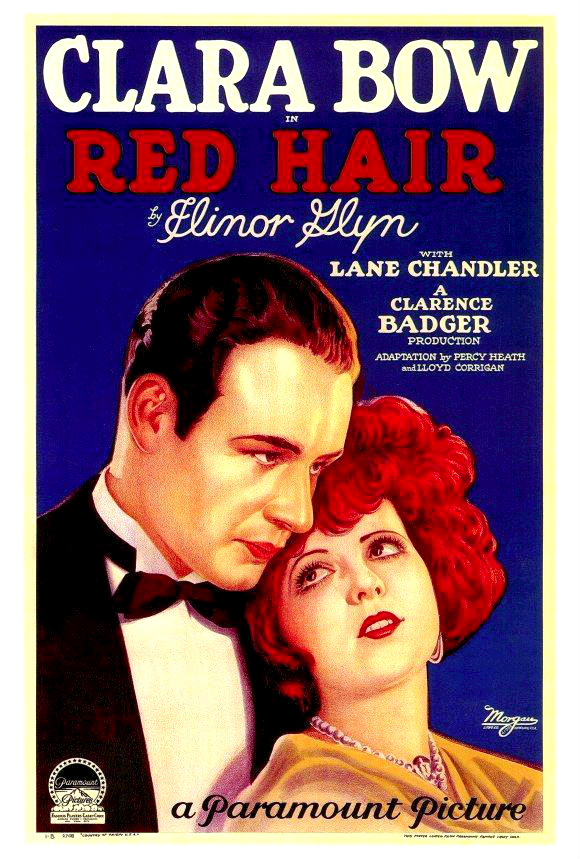
- 1928 theatrical poster
- Directed by: Clarence G. Badger
- Written by: Agnes Brand Leahy
- Screenplay by: Lloyd Corrigan; Percy Heath; Frederica Sagor; Intertitles: George Marion Jr.
- Based on: The Vicissitudes of Evangeline by Elinor Glyn
- Produced by: Adolph Zukor; Jesse L. Lasky; B. P. Schulberg
- Starring: Clara Bow; Lane Chandler; Jacqueline Gadsden; William Austin
- Cinematography: Alfred Gilks
- Edited by: Doris Drought
- Production company: Paramount Famous Lasky Corporation
- Distributed by: Paramount Pictures
- Release date: March 10, 1928
- Running time: 70 minutes
- Country: United States
- Languages: Silent film English intertitles

Red Hair is a 1928 American silent film starring Clara Bow and Lane Chandler, directed by Clarence G. Badger, based on a 1905 novel by Elinor Glyn titled 'Red Hair' but also known as 'The Vicissitudes of Evangeline.' The film was released by Paramount Pictures.

The film had one sequence filmed in Technicolor, and is now considered a lost film except for the color sequence at the UCLA Film & Television Archive, and a few production stills.

== Plot ==
A free-spirited young girl has three middle-aged admirers, each of whom sees her from a completely different perspective. Unknown to her, they also happen to be the guardians of a wealthy young man to whom she is attracted.

== Cast ==
- Clara Bow as Bubbles McCoy
- Lane Chandler as Robert Lennon
- William Austin as Dr. Eustace Gill
- Jacqueline Gadsden as Minnie Luther
- Lawrence Grant as Judge Rufus Lennon
- Claude King as Thomas L. Burke
- William Irving as Demmy

== Production ==
Four days were spent filming on location at Santa Catalina Island.

== See also ==
- List of lost films
- List of early color feature films
