= Red Lips (film) =

1928 film

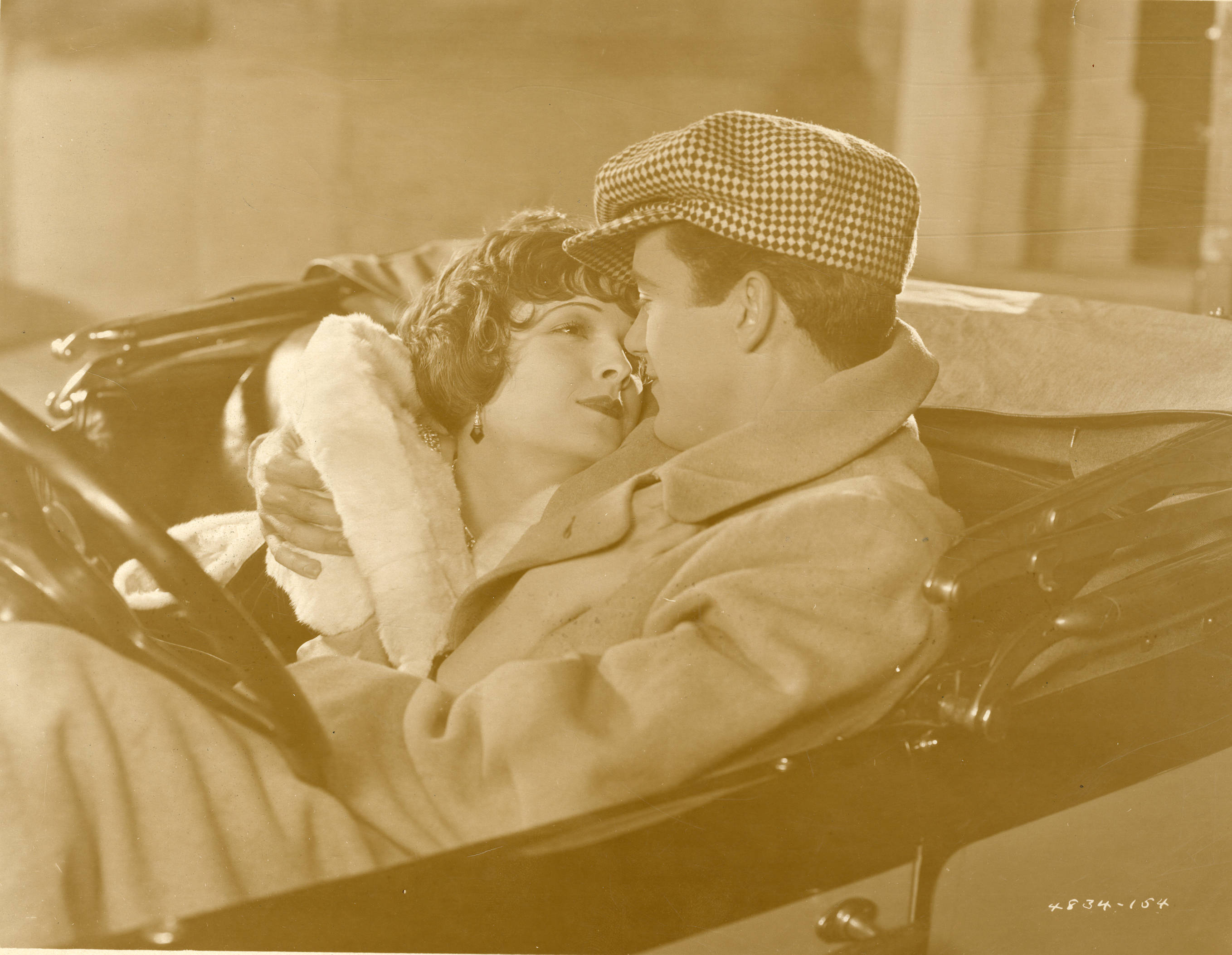
- Film still
- Directed by: Melville W. Brown
- Written by: Melville W. Brown; James T. O'Donohoe; Tom Reed
- Based on: The Plastic Age by Percy Marks
- Produced by: Carl Laemmle
- Starring: Marian Nixon; Charles "Buddy" Rogers; Stanley Taylor
- Cinematography: John Stumar
- Edited by: Ray Curtiss
- Production company: Universal Pictures
- Distributed by: Universal Pictures
- Release date: December 2, 1928
- Running time: 70 minutes
- Country: United States
- Language: Silent (English intertitles)

Red Lips is a 1928 American silent drama film directed by Melville W. Brown and starring Marian Nixon, Charles "Buddy" Rogers, and Stanley Taylor. It is based on the 1924 novel The Plastic Age by Percy Marks.

== Cast ==
- Marian Nixon as Cynthia Day
- Charles "Buddy" Rogers as Hugh Carver / Buddy
- Stanley Taylor as Stewart Freeman / Carl Peters
- Hayden Stevenson as "Pop" Moultin
- Andy Devine as A Sophomore / Professor Fountain
- Robert Seiter as Roache
- Hugh Trevor as "Spike" Blair / Norris Parker
- Earl McCarthy as An Upper Classmate

== Preservation ==
With no prints of Red Lips located in any film archives, it is a Lost film.

== Bibliography ==
- Goble, Alan. The Complete Index to Literary Sources in Film. Walter de Gruyter, 1999.
