= The Waning Sex =

1926 film by Robert Zigler Leonard

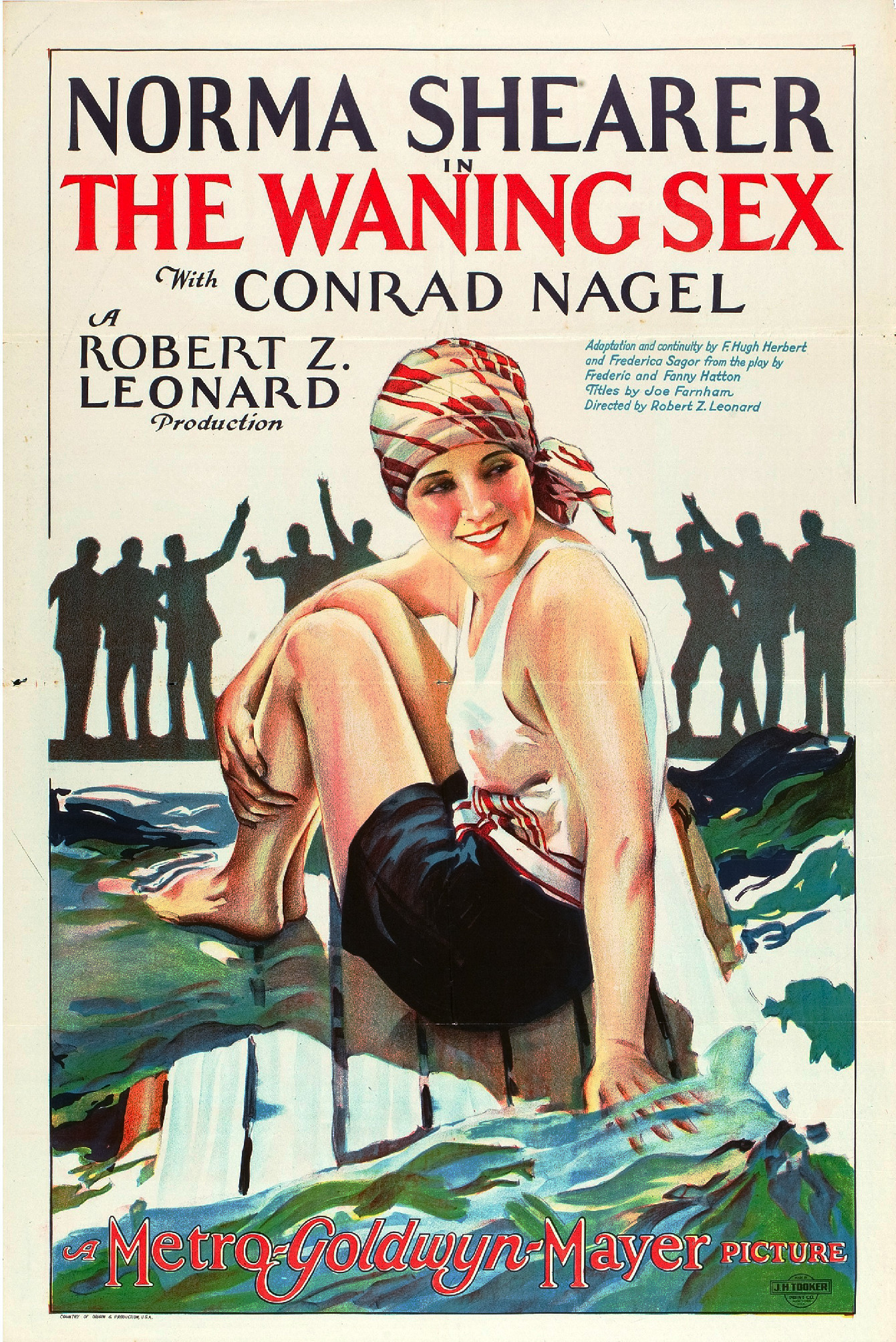
- Film poster
- Directed by: Robert Z. Leonard
- Written by: Joe Farnham (titles); F. Hugh Herbert; Frederica Sagor (uncredited)
- Based on: The Waning Sex by Fanny and Frederic Hatton
- Produced by: Harry Rapf
- Starring: Norma Shearer; Conrad Nagel
- Cinematography: Ben Reynolds
- Edited by: William LeVanway
- Distributed by: Metro-Goldwyn-Mayer
- Release date: September 5, 1926
- Running time: 70 minutes
- Country: United States
- Language: Silent (English intertitles)

The Waning Sex is a 1926 American silent romantic comedy film directed by Robert Z. Leonard. Based on the 1923 play of the same name by Fanny and Frederic Hatton, the film starred Norma Shearer and Conrad Nagel.

== Synopsis ==
Nina Duane (Norma Shearer) is a criminal defense attorney who's resented by chauvinistic D.A. Philip Barry (Conrad Nagel) for her gender. She wins acquittal for a widow named Mary Booth (Mary McAllister), then "defeats her in romancing the D.A".

== Cast ==
- Norma Shearer as Nina Duane
- Conrad Nagel as Philip Barry
- George K. Arthur as Hamilton Day
- Mary McAllister as Mary Booth
- Charles McHugh as J.J. Flannigan
- Tiny Ward as J.J. Murphy
- Martha Mattox as Ellen B. Armstrong

== Preservation ==
Prints of The Waning Sex currently exist in the film archives of the Museum of Modern Art and Centre national du cinéma et de l'image animée in Fort de Bois-d'Arcy, France.
