= The Way of All Flesh (1927 film) =

1927 film by Victor Fleming

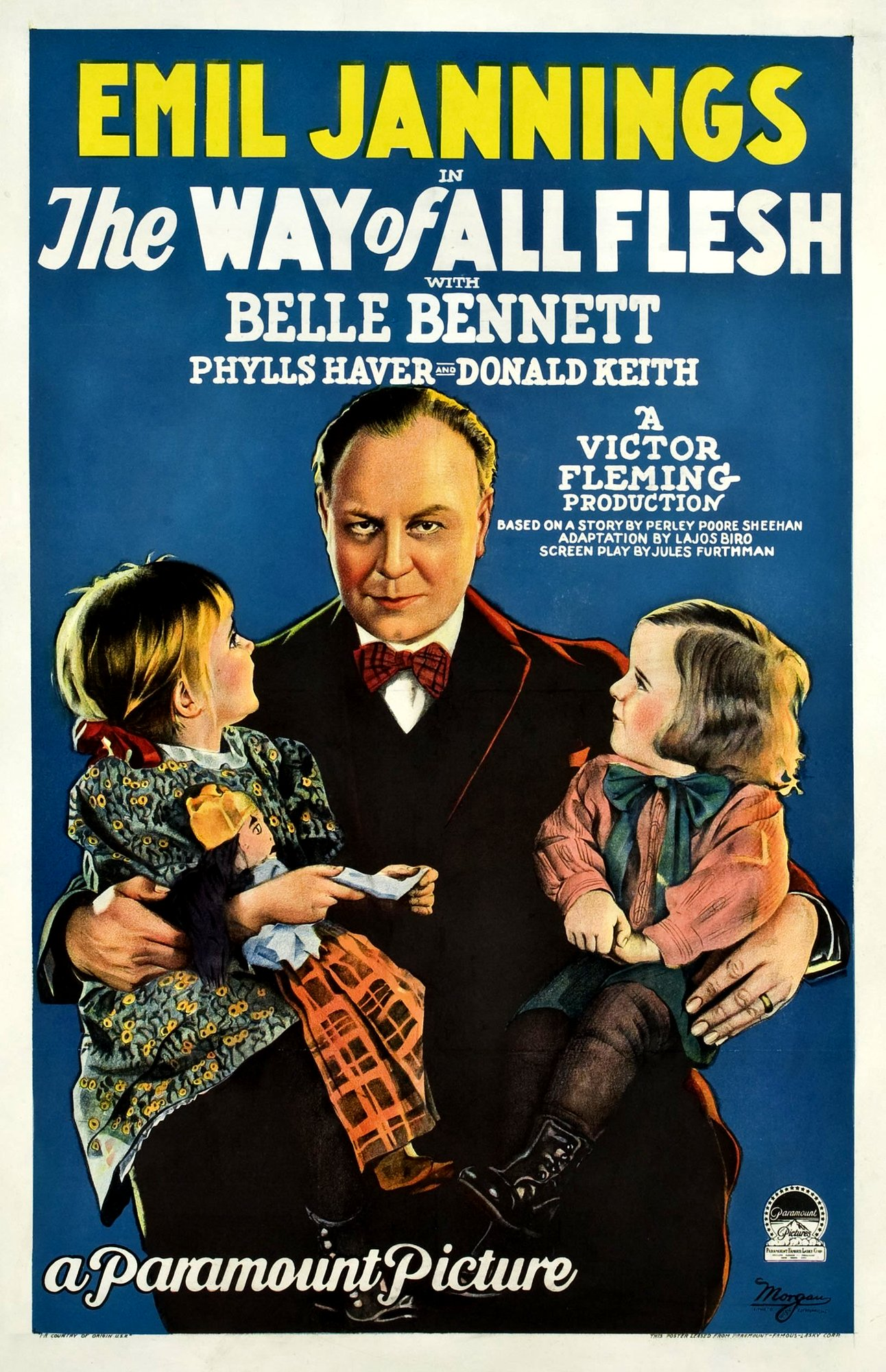
- Film poster
- Directed by: Victor Fleming
- Written by: Lajos Biro (adaptation); Frederica Sagor (adaptation); Jules Furthman (scenario)
- Story by: Perley Poore Sheehan
- Produced by: Adolph Zukor; Jesse L. Lasky
- Starring: Emil Jannings
- Cinematography: Victor Milner
- Distributed by: Paramount Pictures
- Release dates: June 25, 1927 (New York City); October 1, 1927 (U.S.)
- Running time: 9 reels; 8,486 feet
- Country: United States
- Language: Silent (English intertitles)

The Way of All Flesh is a 1927 American silent drama film directed by Victor Fleming, written by Lajos Bíró, Jules Furthman, and Julian Johnson from a story by Perley Poore Sheehan. Star Emil Jannings won the first Academy Award for Best Actor in a Leading Role at the 1929 ceremony for his performances in this film and The Last Command, the only year that multiple roles were considered.

It is now considered a lost film with only two fragments of the film having been found.

== Plot ==
In the story, which opens in the early 1900s with August Schilling, a bank clerk in Milwaukee who is happy with both his job and his family. But when bank officials ask him to transport $1,000 in securities to Chicago, he meets a blond seductress on the train, who sees what he is carrying. She flirts with him, convinces him to buy her a bottle of champagne, and takes him to a saloon run by a crook. The next morning he awakes alone in a dilapidated bedroom, without the securities. He finds the woman, and at first pleads with her, then intimidates her to return the stolen securities. He is knocked unconscious by the saloon owner and dragged to a nearby railroad track.

As the crook strips him of everything that might lead to his identification, Schilling recovers consciousness, and in a struggle the crook is thrown into the path of an oncoming train and killed. Schilling flees, and in despair is about to take his own life, when he sees in a newspaper that he is supposedly dead, the crook's mangled body having been identified as Schilling's. The time passes to twenty years later. Schilling is aged and unkempt, employed to pick up trash in a park. He sees his own family go to a cemetery and place a wreath on his grave. Following other scenes in a Christmas snowstorm, Schilling makes his way to his former home, where he sees that the son whom he had taught to play violin is now a successful musician. He walks away, carrying in his pocket a dollar that his son has given him, not recognizing that the old tramp is his father.

The film is unrelated to Samuel Butler's novel The Way of All Flesh.

== Cast ==
- Emil Jannings as August Schilling
- Belle Bennett as Mrs. Schilling
- Phyllis Haver as The Temptress
- Donald Keith as August Schilling, junior
- Fred Kohler as The Tough
- Philippe De Lacy as August Schilling, jr., as a child
- Mickey McBan as Evald
- Betsy Ann Hisle as Charlotte
- Carmencita Johnson as Elizabeth
- Gordon Thorpe as Karl
- Jackie Combs as Heinrich
- Dean Harrell as Evald
- Anne Sheridan
- Nancy Drexel
- Philip Sleeman (uncredited)

== Production ==
The film is a melodrama starring Emil Jannings, Belle Bennett, and Phyllis Haver. Jannings won the first Academy Award for Best Actor for his performance in this film and his performance in The Last Command (the only year that acting Oscars were awarded for multiple performances).

== Preservation status ==
Only two fragments survive, both from the ending, making Jannings' the only Academy Award-winning performance with no known complete copy of the film preserved. This is one of Victor Fleming's many lost silent films of the 1920s.

== Disputed provenance ==
In her 1999 autobiography, Frederica Maas claimed that the idea for the movie had been stolen from her and her husband Ernest Maas. She said the story was based on the life of her husband's father, who similarly had abandoned his family after making horrible mistakes in his personal life. They named the script "Beefsteak Joe" and presented it to Emil Jannings. As a fellow German-American, Ernest had thought Jannings would help them get the script made into a movie. Instead they were shocked to learn that it had been stolen and produced without any credit or remuneration. The fact that it became an award-winning film only aggravated the situation.

== Remake ==
The movie was remade in 1940 by Paramount Pictures and starred Akim Tamiroff, Gladys George, and William Henry.
