= Ernest Maas =

American film producer

- Born: December 27 1891
- Died: July 21 1986 (aged 94); Los Anglees, California, USA
- Occupation(s): Screenwriter, producer
- Spouse: Frederica Sagor Maas

Ernest Maas (December 27, 1891 – July 21, 1986) was an American silent-era screenwriter.

== Biography ==
Maas first worked on silent films in 1920 when he created the scenario for Uncle Sam of Freedom Ridge, a pro-League of Nations film in the aftermath of World War I. He also was the first to film the almost unbelievable crush of commuters during the rush hour at New York's Grand Central Station. In 1925, he was offered a lucrative contract as a producer in the nascent Hollywood and moved to Los Angeles.

It was not until 1926 that Maas received credit for a movie's entire script, which was for The Country Beyond. In 1927, he wrote a script based on his father's life titled Beefsteak Joe, which he shared with fellow German-American Emil Jannings. The story was stolen and reworked into the successful movie The Way of All Flesh. Maas was never credited.

== Personal life ==
In Hollywood, Maas married fellow screenwriter Frederica Sagor. After many years without an on-screen credit, the two wrote the original story for the 1947 film The Shocking Miss Pilgrim. But Maas never received on-screen credit again. Instead he focused on behind-the-scenes work in television.

The couple lived together until his death from Parkinson's disease in Los Angeles at the age of 94. Afterwards, his wife Frederica published her autobiography describing their life together.
