= The Plastic Age (film) =

1925 film

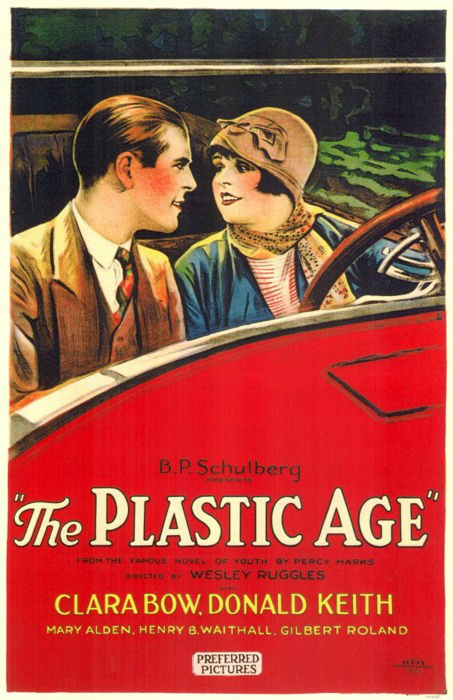
- Reprint of the promotional poster
- Directed by: Wesley Ruggles
- Screenplay by: Frederica Sagor; Eve Unsell
- Based on: The Plastic Age by Percy Marks
- Produced by: B.P. Schulberg
- Starring: Clara Bow; Donald Keith; Gilbert Roland; Mary Alden; Clark Gable
- Cinematography: Allen G. Siegler; Gilbert Warrenton
- Distributed by: Preferred Pictures
- Release dates: December 6, 1925 (U.S.); July 18, 1926 (New York City); April 23, 1928 (Finland)
- Running time: 73 minutes
- Country: United States
- Language: Silent

The Plastic Age is a 1925 American black-and-white silent romantic comedy film directed by Wesley Ruggles and starring Clara Bow, Donald Keith, and Gilbert Roland. The film was based on a best-selling novel from 1924 of the same name, written by Percy Marks, a Brown University English instructor who chronicled the life of the fast-set of that university and used the fictitious Sanford College as a backdrop. The Plastic Age is known to most silent film fans as the very first hit of Clara Bow's career, and helped jumpstart her fast rise to stardom. Frederica Sagor Maas and Eve Unsell adapted the book for the screen.

== Plot ==
The Plastic Age (1925)

Hugh Carver is an athletic star and a freshman at Prescott College. During a hazing initiation by his fraternity brothers, he meets Cynthia Day, a popular girl who loves to party and have a good time. She introduces him to the pleasures of illicit drinking, dancing at illegal roadhouses, and making out in the back seats of cars. A love-triangle develops between Day, Carver, and Carver's roommate, Carl Peters, who also likes Day. Eventually, Peters gives up his crush on Day and reconciles his friendship with Carver.

Carver's grades, athletic performance and moral character begin to suffer as a result of his late nights and wild partying, and on a visit home, his strict father tosses him out of the house and tells him not to come back until he's 'made good'. After almost being arrested at a roadhouse raid, Day and Carver escape in her automobile, and Day realizes that her lifestyle is bad for Carver, so the two stop seeing each other.

Carver's school performance then improves greatly, and he leads his teammates to victory at the big football game at the end of the year. Peters tells Carver that Day still loves him, and that she has changed, becoming less wild and more mature. Day and Carver are reunited at the end.

== Cast ==
- Donald Keith as Hugh Carver
- Clara Bow as Cynthia Day
- Mary Alden as Mrs. Carver
- Henry B. Walthall as Henry Carver
- Gilbert Roland as Carl Peters
- David Butler as Coach Henley
- J. Gordon Edwards Jr. as Norrie Parks (uncredited)
- Jack Egan as Sophomore (uncredited)
- Bill Elliott as Athlete (uncredited)
- Clark Gable as Athlete (uncredited)
- Janet Gaynor as Co-Ed (uncredited)
- Gwen Lee as Carl's Girl (uncredited)
- Carole Lombard as Co-Ed (uncredited)
- Roger Moore as Amorous Student (uncredited)
- Churchill Ross as Student With Glasses (uncredited)
- Felix Valle as Merton Billings (uncredited)

== Production ==
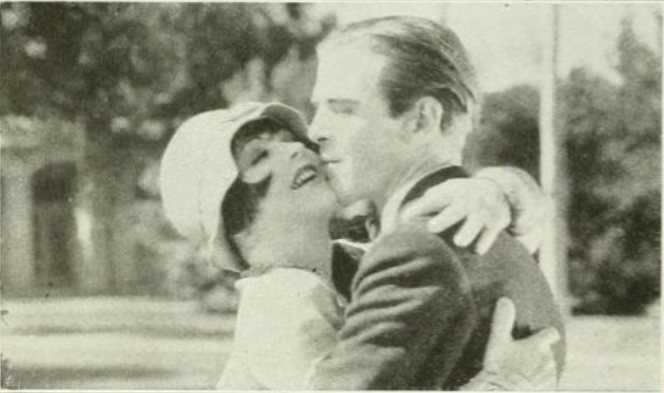
Still from The Plastic Age.

The Plastic Age was based on the 1924 novel of the same name, which was written by Brown University professor Percy Marks, a popular novelist at the time. Marks' novels were based on his students, the 'flaming youth in rebellion' of the twenties, who danced to wild jazz, drank from silver flasks, and had petting parties. Benjamin Percival Schulberg, the CEO of Preferred Pictures (a film studio and film distributor, as well as an actors agency), outbid all the major and minor studios for the rights to The Plastic Age; Schulberg paid $35,000 for the copyrights to the novel. The Plastic Age was filmed in the summer of 1925, at both Pomona College, located in Claremont, California, and in Hollywood, at the FBO Studios, the production company owned and operated by Joseph P. Kennedy, the wealthy Boston, Massachusetts banker/stockbroker patriarch of the Kennedy family.

The film became a major hit in late 1925, and was Bow's first hit film. She became a star as a result of its success, which led her to being signed by a major studio and becoming a major star with the 1927 release of It. After seeing The Plastic Age soon after its release, Adolph Zukor, the founder and CEO of Paramount Pictures, contacted Schulberg, who had started his career as a publicist with Paramount before leaving the studio in 1918 to form Preferred Pictures. According to Clara Bow biographer David Stenn, Zukor proposed to Schulberg that he wanted to merge Preferred Pictures with Paramount, so that he could get Bow and make a star out of her, due to what Zukor saw as the great potential that she had as an actress. Schulberg agreed, but wanted Zukor to allow him to produce and control the product that Paramount assigned to him for Bow, which included script, casting, production crew, and wardrobe control. He also wanted to be made an associate producer at Paramount. The deal was made in early November 1925.

== Controversy ==
Even though the film was a wide spread success, the Woman's Christian Temperance Union (WCTU) showed concerns for the film's portrayal of alcohol consumption as acceptable, regardless of the restrictions that prohibition brought in. They also voiced their opinion on the swingers' dance style and jazz music as "behaviour which is desperately in need of purification by the cleansing powers of Holy water."

== Home media ==
The Plastic Age was released on DVD, through Image Entertainment, in a double-feature format, which includes the Louise Brooks film, The Show Off (1926). David Shepard preserved the film through his company, Film Preservation Associates. Composer Eric Beheim scored the music for The Plastic Age. Kino On Video released the film in August 1999, as part of a 4 video set featuring Clara's work, which includes It (1927).

== See also ==
- List of American football films
