= The Plastic Age =

1924 novel by Percy Marks

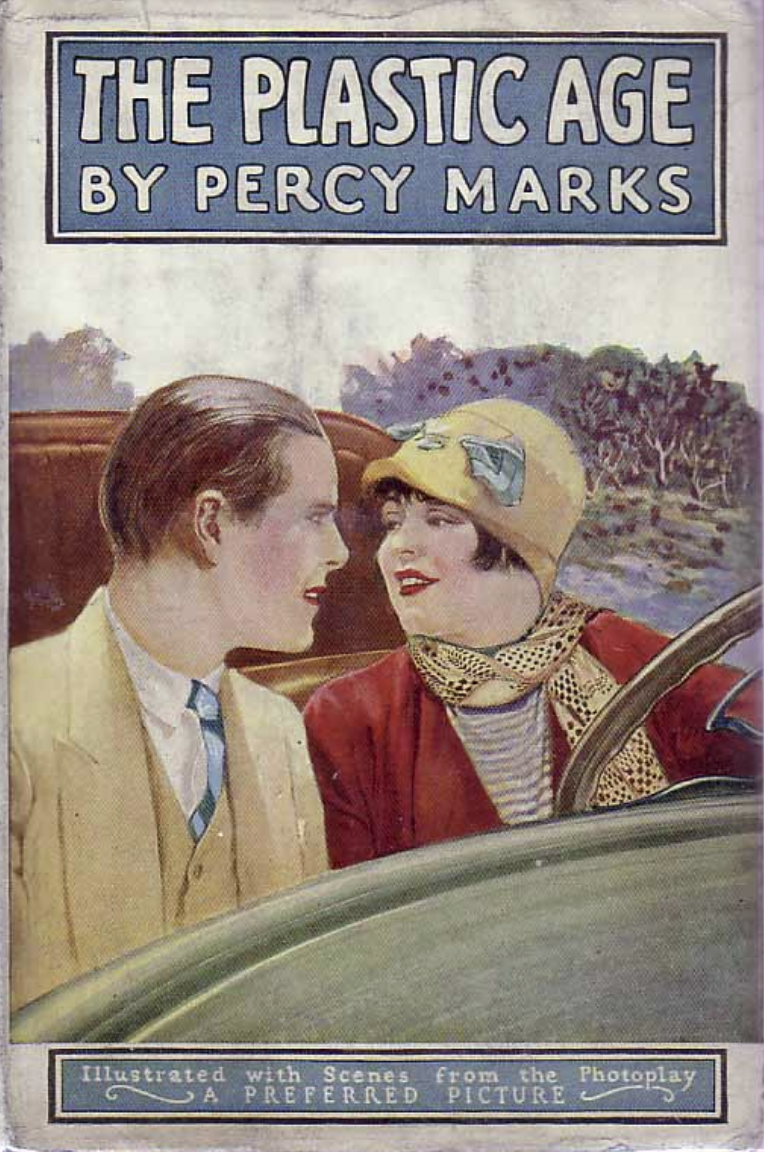
- First edition, with a picture from the movie that was released a year after the book was published
- Author: Percy Marks
- Language: English
- Publication date: 1924

The Plastic Age is a 1924 novel by Percy Marks that tells the story of Hugh Carver, who is a student at a fictional men's college called Sanford. The book was the second-best selling novel of 1924; it depicted or implied hazing, smoking, drinking, partying, and heavy petting. It was banned in Boston. The following year, it was adapted into a film of the same name, starring Clara Bow.

At the time of the novel's publication, Marks was an English instructor at Brown University. School administrators at Brown took offense at the book's setting, which they said was a barely disguised version of their own school, and they did not renew Marks's teaching contract. Marks had previously taught at Dartmouth College and at the Massachusetts Institute of Technology; he left academia for many years and worked as a full-time author.

The Plastic Age describes many aspects of 1920s college campus life. It refers to traditions at Dartmouth and Brown, including the use of bonfires, the wearing of beanies, and fraternity rush. In the novel, students attend a film at a lightly fictionalized version of the Nugget Theater in Hanover, New Hampshire, which had opened in 1916. Marks and his book remained popular on college campuses for several years after the book's publication. Students—including humorist S. J. Perelman—protested about Marks's treatment at the hands of the Brown administrators and a satire of the book, The Plastered Age by E.Z. Mark, was produced on campus.

In 1928, the novel was again adapted into a film, under the title Red Lips. This remake starred Charles "Buddy" Rogers (who, the previous year, had co-starred with Clara Bow in the film Wings).

Southern Illinois University Press re-released The Plastic Age in 1980, in the Lost American Fiction series. The book remains in print.

== Characters ==
- Hugh Carver—protagonist, lives in Merrytown, undergraduate at Haydensville's Sanford College, runner, musician, aspiring writer; described as slender, young-looking, with light-brown hair
- Helen Simpson—lives in Merrytown, girlfriend to Hugh, moves away to attend secretarial school
- Janet (Harton) Moffitt—lives at Corley Lake, girlfriend to Hugh (briefly)
- Cynthia Day—lives in Long Island, girlfriend to Hugh, described as running with a "fast crowd" though not explicitly described as a "flapper"
- Carl Peters—undergraduate, roommate to Hugh, forced to leave Sanford after contracting an STD in Hastings
- Norville "Norry" Parker—undergraduate, friend of Cynthia and Hugh, Irish Catholic, lives on Long Island Sound, described as slender, quietly affluent, summer host to Hugh
- Malcolm Graham—undergraduate, president of Delta Sigma Deltas, attempted mentor to Hugh
- Einstein—undergraduate, friend of Hugh, Jewish
- Merle Douglas, Bob Tucker, Leonard Gates, John "Jack" Lawrence—undergraduates, Nu Delta presidents
- Jim "Mac" McCarty—proprietor of the Haydensville billiard parlor
- Hester Sheville—(inebriated) guest at Nu Delta dance
- Jim Pearson—undergraduate, drives Hugh and Carl to Hastings bootlegger
- Paul Vinton—undergraduate, roommate to Hugh, regularly plies Hugh with liquor
- Bessie Haines, Emma Gleeson—Hastings prostitutes
- Ted Allen—undergraduate, gambling proprietor (poker and craps), card shark, hustler, presumed cheat
- Harry King—undergraduate, weapon-owner
- President Culver—Sanford College President
- Professor Jimmie Henley—Sanford College English Professor, mentor to Hugh
- Professor Hartley—Sanford College History Professor
- Mr. Alling—Sanford College Latin Instructor
- Professor Kane—Sanford College Mathematics Professor, academic advisor to Hugh
- Professor Blake—Sanford College Professor
- "Doc" Conners—Sanford College Physician
- Jack Price—Sanford College Football Coach
- Harry Slade—undergraduate, captain of the football team, half-back
- Sherman Walford—undergraduate, captain of the football team
- Herbert Morse—undergraduate, described as noble-looking, removed from the football team, withdrew due to home-sickness
- Wayne Gifford—undergraduate, cheerleader
- Clem Morton, Hubert Manning, Jack Collings, Jim Hicks, Harry Smithson, Chubby Elson, Donald Ferguson, Ferdy Hillman, Freddy Dickson, Freddy Fowler, George Winsor, Gordon Ross, Jim Saunders, Keith Nutter, Larry Stillwell, Melville Burbank, Merton Billings, Puddy McCumber, Pudge Jamieson—undergraduates
