= Percy Marks =

American novelist

Percy Marks (September 9, 1891 − December 27, 1956) was an American writer and college English instructor best known for his best selling 1924 novel, The Plastic Age.

Marks was born in Covelo, California in 1891 to Henry and Sarah Lando Marks. The family moved to Ukiah in 1900, the county seat, because it had better schools. Marks graduated from the University of California in 1912 and obtained a master's degree from Harvard University in 1914. He was a second lieutenant in the United States Army during World War I.

Marks had been teaching English for ten years (at a number of institutions, including Dartmouth College and Brown University) when his first novel was published in 1924, The Plastic Age. The book was the second most popular best-seller for that year, and its portrayal of college life caused a ruckus at the time and was even banned in Boston. Marks left teaching the following year to focus full-time on writing. A movie version of the Plastic Age with a highly changed plot was released the next year starring Clara Bow, and a second version titled Red Lips released in 1928, which was directed by Melville W. Brown. Marks wrote 19 additional books, primarily novels. Late in his career, he took a post teaching English and literature at the University of Connecticut at Waterbury.

Marks married Margaret Ellen Gates in California on December 17, 1927. He moved to New Haven, Connecticut in 1930, and resided there until he died, on December 27, 1956, survived by his wife and daughter Sally Jean Marks. In 1962, Marks' widow (then remarried to Bernard Barton), donated his papers to Yale University where they are held at the Beinecke Rare Book and Manuscript Library.

Sally Marks became a scholar of international relations at Rhode Island College.

== Bibliography ==
Marks' published books include:

- The Plastic Age (1924)
- Martha (1925)
- Which Way Parnassus? (1926)
- Lord of Himself (1927) (sequel to The Plastic Age)
- A Dead Man Dies (1929)
- The Unwilling God (1929)
- The Craft of Writing (1932)
- A Tree Grown Straight (1936)
- Better themes, a college textbook of writing and re-writing (1936)
- And Points Beyond (1937)
- What's A Heaven For? (1938)
- The Days Are Fled (1939)
- No Steeper Wall (1940)
- Between Two Autumns (1941)
- Full Flood (1942)
- Knave of Diamonds (1943)
- Shade of Sycamore (1944)
- The College Writer (1946)
- Blair Marriman (1949)
- Round Valley Days (unpublished manuscript)
