= Alan Crosland =

American actor and film director (1894–1936)

Frederick Alan Crosland
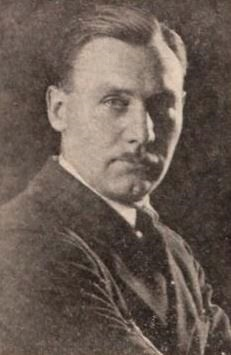
- Crosland in 1921
- Born: Frederick Alan Crosland; August 10, 1894; New York City, U.S.
- Died: July 16, 1936 (aged 41); Hollywood, California, U.S.
- Resting place: Hollywood Forever Cemetery
- Years active: 1916–1936
- Spouse(s): Juanita Fletcher (m. 1917; div. 1921) Natalie Moorhead (m. 1930; div. 1935)
- Children: 1, Alan Crosland Jr.

Frederick Alan Crosland (August 10, 1894 – July 16, 1936) was an American stage actor and film director. He is noted for having directed the first feature film using spoken dialogue, The Jazz Singer (1927) and the first feature movie with synchronization soundtrack, Don Juan (1926).

== Early life and career ==
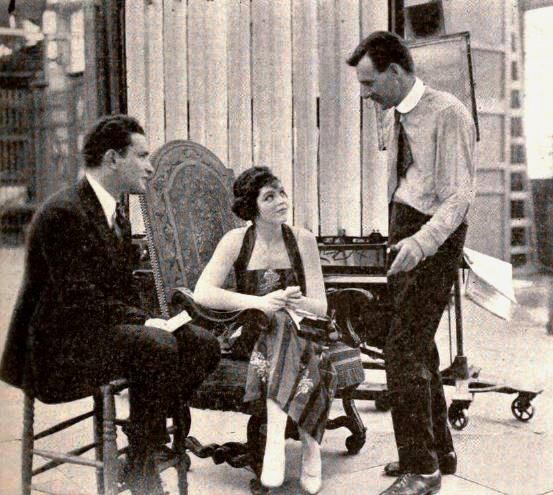
Alan Crosland (standing) telling stories to Myron Selznick and Elaine Hammerstein, 1919

Born in New York City, New York to a well-to-do family, Crosland attended Dartmouth College. After graduation, he took a job as a writer with the New York Globe magazine. Interested in the theatre, he began acting on stage, appearing in several productions with Shakespearian actress Annie Russell.

Crosland began his career in the motion picture industry in 1912 at Edison Studios in The Bronx, New York, where he worked at various jobs for two years until he had learned the business sufficiently well to begin directing short films. By 1917, he was directing feature-length films and in 1920 directed Olive Thomas in The Flapper, one of her final films before her death in September of that year.

In 1925, Crosland was working for Jesse L. Lasky's film production company Famous Players–Lasky (later Paramount Pictures) when he was hired by Warner Bros. to work at their Hollywood studios. He had directed several silent films for Warner's including directing Don Juan starring John Barrymore in 1926. It was the first feature-length film with synchronized Vitaphone sound effects and musical soundtrack, though it has no spoken dialogue. He was chosen to direct Al Jolson in The Jazz Singer (1927). The film would make him famous as the first of the new talkies that changed the course of motion pictures.

== Death ==
Crosland died in 1936 at the age of 41 as a result of an automobile accident on Sunset Boulevard in Los Angeles. He is interred in the Hollywood Forever Cemetery. His grave remained unmarked for 67 years until a headstone was donated by The Hollywood Underground in 2003.

His son, Alan Crosland Jr. (1918–2001), would also have a successful career as a television director. Juanita Fletcher was his mother.

== Filmography ==
- Santa Claus vs. Cupid (1915) (writer)
- Kidnapped (1917)
- The Light in Darkness (1917)
- Chris and His Wonderful Lamp (1917)
- The Little Chevalier (1917)
- The Apple Tree Girl (1917)
- The Whirlpool (1918)
- The Unbeliever (1918)
- The Country Cousin (1919)
- Greater Than Fame (1920)
- Everybody's Sweetheart (1920)
- Youthful Folly (1920)
- The Flapper (1920)
- The Point of View (1920)
- Broadway and Home (1920)
- Worlds Apart (1921)
- Is Life Worth Living? (1921)
- Room and Board (1921)
- Slim Shoulders (1922)
- Shadows of the Sea (1922)
- The Face in the Fog (1922)
- Why Announce Your Marriage? (1922)
- The Snitching Hour (1922)
- The Prophet's Paradise (1922)
- Enemies of Women (1923)
- Under the Red Robe (1923)
- Three Weeks (1924)
- Miami (1924)
- Unguarded Women (1924)
- Sinners in Heaven (1924)
- Contraband (1925)
- Compromise (1925)
- Bobbed Hair (1925)
- Don Juan (1926)
- When a Man Loves (1927)
- The Beloved Rogue (1927)
- Old San Francisco (1927)
- The Jazz Singer (1927)
- Glorious Betsy (1928)
- The Scarlet Lady (1928)
- On with the Show! (1929)
- General Crack (1929)
- The Furies (1930)
- Song of the Flame (1930)
- Big Boy (1930)
- Viennese Nights (1930)
- Captain Thunder (1930)
- Children of Dreams (1931)
- The Silver Lining (1932)
- Week Ends Only (1932)
- Massacre (1934)
- The Personality Kid (1934)
- Midnight Alibi (1934)
- The Case of the Howling Dog (1934)
- The White Cockatoo (1935)
- It Happened in New York (1935)
- Mister Dynamite (1935)
- Lady Tubbs (1935)
- King Solomon of Broadway (1935)
- The Great Impersonation (1935)
- The Case of the Black Cat (1936)
