= The Miracle of Manhattan =

1921 film

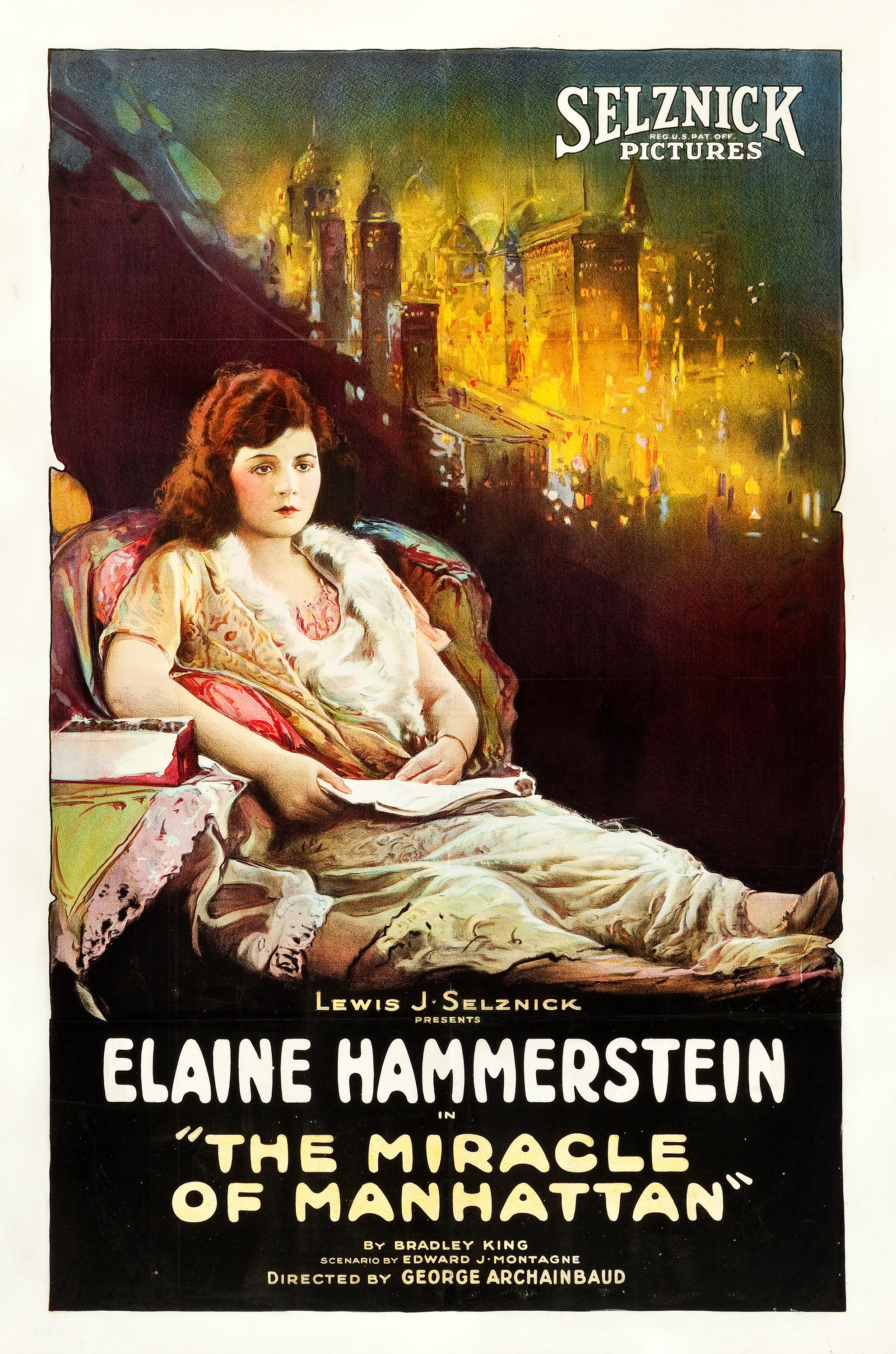
- film lobby poster
- Directed by: George Archainbaud
- Written by: Edward J. Montagne (scenario); Bradley King(story)
- Produced by: Lewis J. Selznick
- Starring: Elaine Hammerstein; Matt Moore
- Cinematography: William Wagner
- Production company: Selznick Pictures
- Distributed by: Select Pictures
- Release date: April 10, 1921
- Running time: 5 reels
- Country: United States
- Language: Silent (English intertitles)

The Miracle of Manhattan is a lost 1921 American silent melodrama film directed by George Archainbaud and starring Elaine Hammerstein and Matt Moore. It was produced by Lewis J. Selznick (of Selznick Pictures) and released through Select Pictures.

== Cast ==
- Elaine Hammerstein as Mary Malone/Evelyn Whitney
- Matt Moore as Larry Marshall
- Ellen Cassidy as Stella Warren (credited as Ellen Cassity)
- Nora Reed as An Intruder
- Walter Greene as Tony the Dude
- Leonora von Ottinger as Mrs. Peabody (credited as Leonora Ottinger)
- John Raymond as Robert Van Cleek (credited as Jack Raymond)
