= The Love Trap (1929 film) =

1929 film

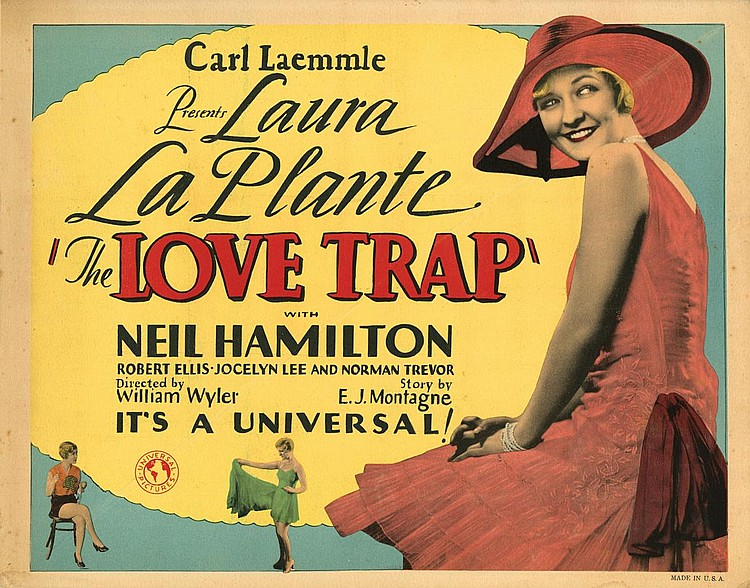
- Lobby card
- Directed by: William Wyler
- Written by: Edward J. Montagne; John B. Clymer; Clarence Marks; Clarence Thompson; Albert DeMond
- Produced by: William Wyler
- Starring: Laura La Plante; Neil Hamilton; Robert Ellis
- Cinematography: Gilbert Warrenton
- Edited by: Edward Curtiss; Harry Marker
- Music by: Joseph Cherniavsky
- Production company: Universal Pictures
- Distributed by: Universal Pictures
- Release date: August 4, 1929
- Running time: 71 minutes
- Country: United States
- Languages: Sound (Part-Talkie); English intertitles

The Love Trap is a 1929 American sound part-talkie comedy film directed by William Wyler and starring Laura La Plante, Neil Hamilton, and Robert Ellis. In addition to sequences with audible dialogue or talking sequences, the film features a synchronized musical score and sound effects along with English intertitles. The soundtrack was recorded using the Western Electric sound-on-film system.

== Synopsis ==
A young woman meets a millionaire, but his family suspect her of being a gold digger.

== Cast ==
- Laura La Plante as Evelyn Todd
- Neil Hamilton as Paul Harrington
- Robert Ellis as Guy Emory
- Jocelyn Lee as Bunny
- Norman Trevor as Judge Harrington
- Clarissa Selwynne as Mrs. Harrington
- Rita La Roy as Mary Harrington

== See also ==
- List of early sound feature films (1926–1929)

== Bibliography ==
- Dick, Bernard F. City of Dreams: The Making and Remaking of Universal Pictures. University Press of Kentucky, 2015. ISBN 0-8131-2916-0
