= Huntley Gordon =

Canadian actor (1879–1956)

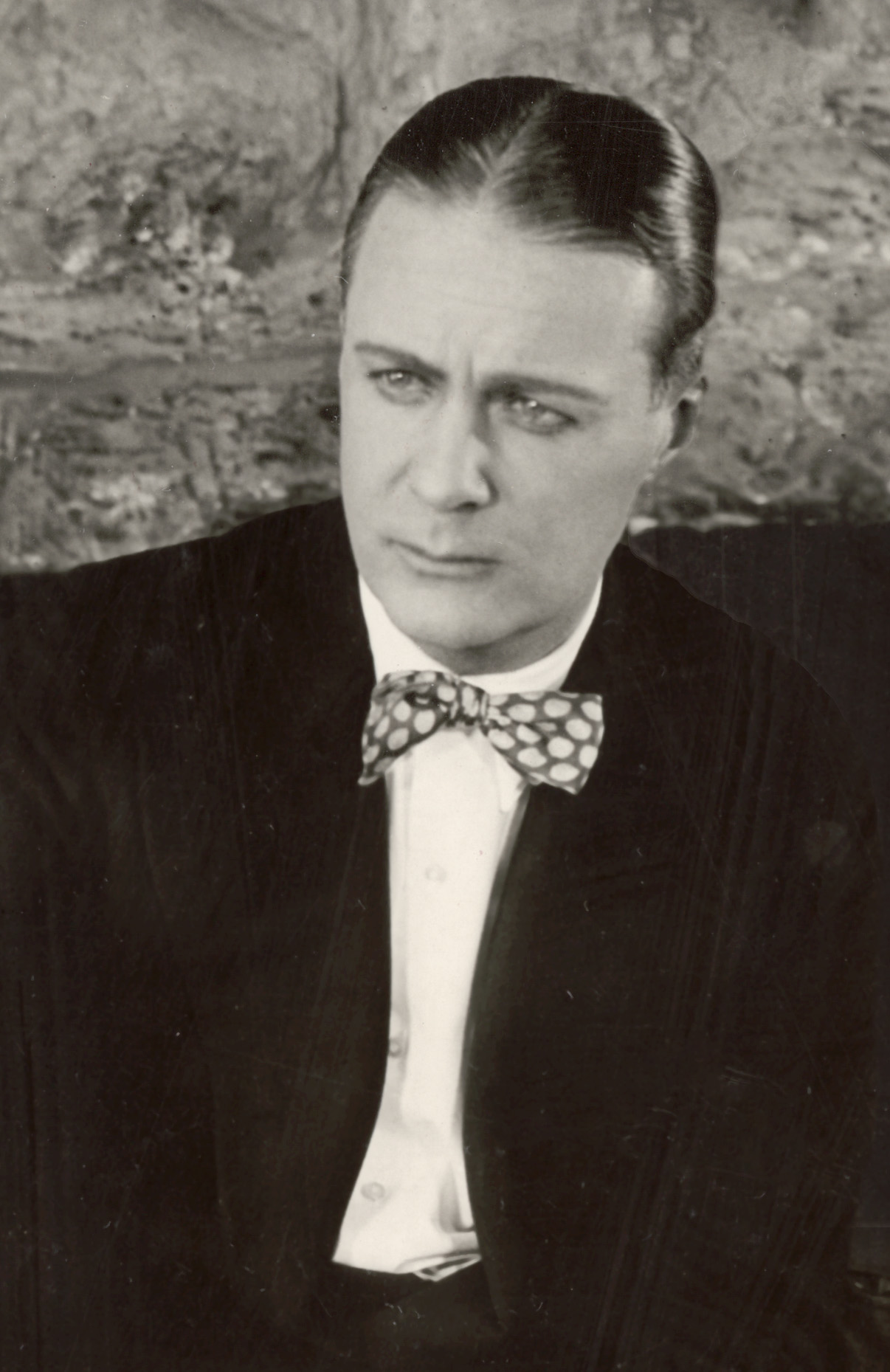
- Gordon in The Beloved Imposter (1918)
- Born: October 8, 1879; Montreal, Quebec, Canada
- Died: December 7, 1956 (aged 77); Van Nuys, California, United States
- Years active: 1916–1941

Huntley Ashworth Gordon (October 8, 1879 – December 7, 1956) was a Canadian actor who began his career in the Silent Film era.

== Profile ==
Gordon was born in Montreal, Quebec, and educated in both Canada and England. He had various jobs including working in a bank, in a silver mine, contracting, as a commercial traveller, and being a cigarette factory owner before settling on the stage and at one time acted with Ethel Barrymore. His Broadway credits included Life (1914) and Our Mrs. McChesney (1915).

He began his screen career in 1916 when given a chance by Thomas Ince. Gordon was once a model for Arrow Collars; he was once painted by American commercial illustrator J. C. Leyendecker.

He served in the Canadian Army during World War I and began a career in motion pictures in England where he had been stationed during the war. With his suave manner and classic good looks he was sought out in Hollywood, California where he acted in both silent and talking films.

In Hollywood, he appeared in numerous films including starring opposite Gloria Swanson in the 1923 film Bluebeard's 8th Wife. That same year he starred in The Wanters with Norma Shearer and Marie Prevost.

For most of his career, Gordon traveled between America and Britain, making films in both countries, appearing in more than 120 films. He was with MGM studios when he retired from film in 1940 and invested in the manufacture of silk stockings, a lucrative business at a time when Canadian and British women could not get them due to the rationing brought on by the Second World War. Although he no longer made motion pictures, Huntley Gordon remained active in the world of network radio.

Gordon died of a heart attack in Van Nuys, California, and was interred in the Forest Lawn Memorial Park Cemetery in Glendale, California.

== Partial filmography ==
- The Conflict (1916)
- The Eleventh Commandment (1918)
- The Beloved Impostor (1918)
- Men (1918)
- The Common Cause (1919)
- The Unknown Quantity (1919)
- The Glorious Lady (1919)
- Atonement (1919)
- Out Yonder (1919)
- Out of the Snows (1920)
- The Frisky Mrs. Johnson (1920)
- Red Foam (1920)
- Enchantment (1921)
- Chivalrous Charley (1921)
- Society Snobs (1921)
- Tropical Love (1921)
- The Girl from Nowhere (1921)
- At the Stage Door (1921)
- Beyond the Rainbow (1922)
- What Fools Men Are (1922)
- When the Desert Calls (1922)
- Reckless Youth (1922)
- What's Wrong with the Women? (1922)
- Why Announce Your Marriage? (1922)
- His Wife's Husband (1922)
- The Famous Mrs. Fair (1923)
- Your Friend and Mine (1923)
- Bluebeard's 8th Wife (1923)
- Chastity (1923)
- The Social Code (1923)
- The Wanters (1923)
- Pleasure Mad (1923)
- Shadows of Paris (1924)
- True as Steel (1924)
- The Enemy Sex (1924)
- Wine (1924)
- Daring Love (1924)
- Married Flirts (1924)
- So This Is Marriage (1924)
- The Great Divide (1925)
- Never the Twain Shall Meet (1925)
- Her Second Chance (1926)
- Silken Shackles (1926)
- The Gilded Butterfly (1926)
- The Golden Web (1926)
- Lost at Sea (1926)
- Sensation Seekers (1927)
- Don't Tell the Wife (1927)
- Gypsy of the North (1928)
- A Certain Young Man (1928)
- Name the Woman (1928)
- Our Dancing Daughters (1928)
- Outcast (1928)
- Sinners in Love (1928)
- Melody Lane (1929)
- The Marriage Playground (1929)
- New Movietone Follies of 1930 (1930)
- Sally of the Subway (1932)
- Night World (1932)
- Broadway to Cheyenne (1932)
- The Phantom Express (1932)
- Speed Madness (1932)
- Midnight Warning (1933)
- Secrets (1933)
- The World Gone Mad (1933)
- Corruption (1933)
- She Had to Choose (1934)
- Their Big Moment (1934)
- Dancing Man (1934)
- Murder by Television (1935)
- Daniel Boone (1936)
- China Passage (1937)
- Stage Door (1937)
- Idol of the Crowds (1937)
- Gangster's Boy (1938)
- Mr. Wong in Chinatown (1939)
- Phantom Of Chinatown (1940)
