= Remorseless Love =

1921 silent film

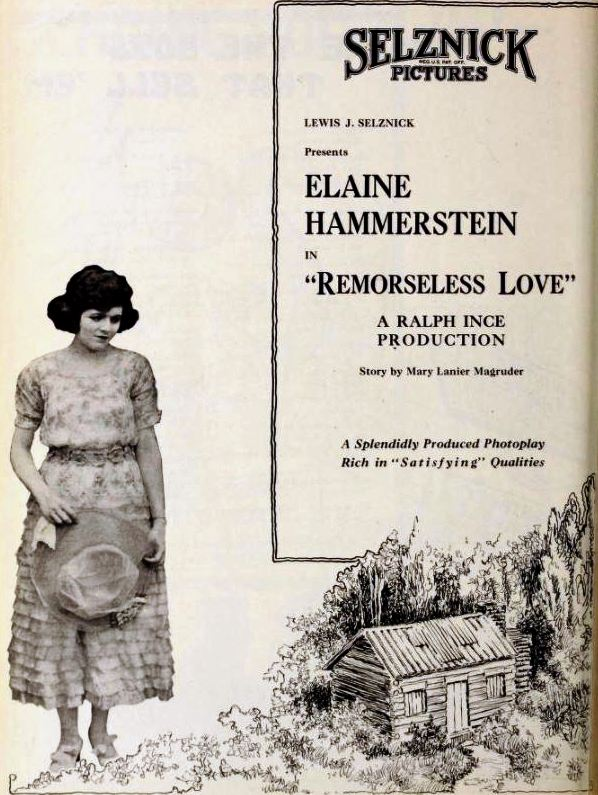
- Directed by: Ralph Ince
- Written by: Mary Lanier Magruder; Edward J. Montagne
- Produced by: Lewis J. Selznick
- Starring: Elaine Hammerstein; Niles Welch; Jerry Devine
- Cinematography: William F. Wagner
- Production company: Selznick Pictures
- Distributed by: Selznick Pictures
- Release date: August 1921
- Running time: 50 minutes
- Country: United States
- Languages: Silent; English intertitles

Remorseless Love is a 1921 American silent drama film directed by Ralph Ince and starring Elaine Hammerstein, Niles Welch and Jerry Devine.

== Cast ==
- Elaine Hammerstein as Ruth Baird
- Niles Welch as Enoch Morrison
- Jerry Devine as Dave Hatfield
- Rae Allen as Hester Morrison
- James Seeley as Cosmo Hatfield
- Effingham Pinto as Cameron Hatfield

== Bibliography ==
- Munden, Kenneth White. The American Film Institute Catalog of Motion Pictures Produced in the United States, Part 1. University of California Press, 1997.
