= The Deadline (film) =

1931 film by Lambert Hillyer

- Directed by: Lambert Hillyer
- Written by: Lambert Hillyer
- Starring: Buck Jones; Loretta Sayers; Robert Ellis
- Cinematography: Byron Haskin
- Edited by: Maurice Wright
- Production company: Columbia Pictures
- Distributed by: Columbia Pictures
- Release date: December 3, 1931
- Running time: 65 minutes
- Country: United States
- Language: English

The Deadline is a 1931 American pre-Code Western film directed by Lambert Hillyer and starring Buck Jones and Robert Ellis. It was produced and distributed by Columbia Pictures.

== Cast ==
- Buck Jones as Buck Donlin (as Charles 'Buck' Jones)
- Loretta Sayers as Helen Evans
- Robert Ellis as Ira Coleman (a.k.a. Clink Durand)
- Ed Brady as Lefty (as Edwin J. Brady)
- G. Raymond Nye as Sheriff Grady
- Knute Erickson as Otto
- George Ernest as Jimmy Evans
- Harry Todd as Chloride
- James Curtis as Shores (uncredited)
- James Farley as Cassiday (uncredited)

== Critical reception ==
Variety gave a positive review and wrote, "[the film contains] All the best elements of the good grade of old time western, done effectively with dialog and sound ... It looks like a sure winner ... Story has a world of action, with intricate complications that engage attention and make for suspense." The reviewer also complimented the performances : "Picture has several nicely played types; Loretta Sayers does the heroine vastly better than most young women manage western roles of the kind, and George Ernest does a kid role that will evoke a-a-ahs. Jones himself plays with a good deal of reserve and force, considering the flamboyant role he tackles."
