= The Girl from Nowhere (1921 film) =

1921 film

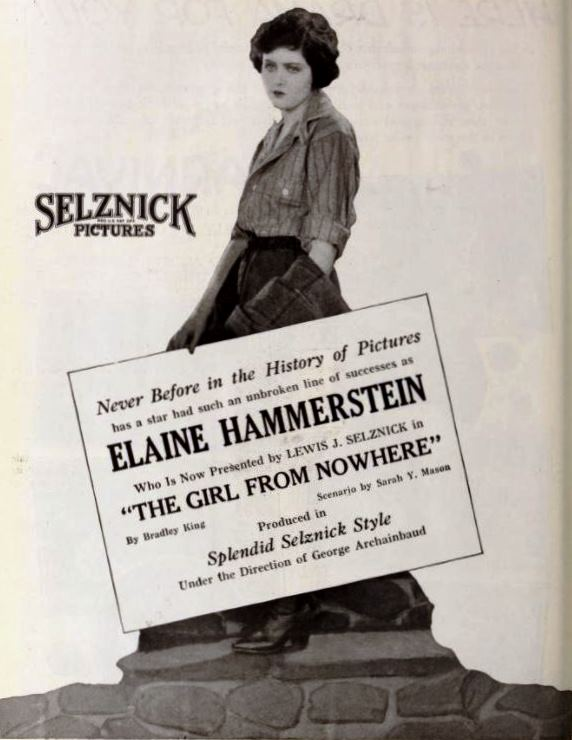
- Directed by: George Archainbaud
- Written by: Bradley King; Sarah Y. Mason
- Produced by: Lewis J. Selznick
- Starring: Elaine Hammerstein; William B. Davidson; Huntley Gordon
- Cinematography: William F. Wagner
- Production company: Selznick Pictures
- Distributed by: Select Pictures
- Release date: June 1921
- Running time: 50 minutes
- Country: United States
- Languages: Silent; English intertitles

The Girl from Nowhere is a 1921 American silent drama film directed by George Archainbaud, starring Elaine Hammerstein, William B. Davidson and Huntley Gordon.

== Cast ==
- Elaine Hammerstein as Mavis Cole
- William B. Davidson as Jimmy Ryder
- Huntley Gordon as Herbert Whitman
- Louise Prussing as Dorothy Grosscup
- Colin Campbell as Samuel Grosscup
- Al Stewart as Steve La Marche
- Warren Cook as Judge Cole
- Vera Conroy as Grace Parker

== Bibliography ==
- Connelly, Robert B. The Silents: Silent Feature Films, 1910-36, Volume 40, Issue 2. December Press, 1998.
- Munden, Kenneth White. The American Film Institute Catalog of Motion Pictures Produced in the United States, Part 1. University of California Press, 1997.
