= The Mad Lover (film) =

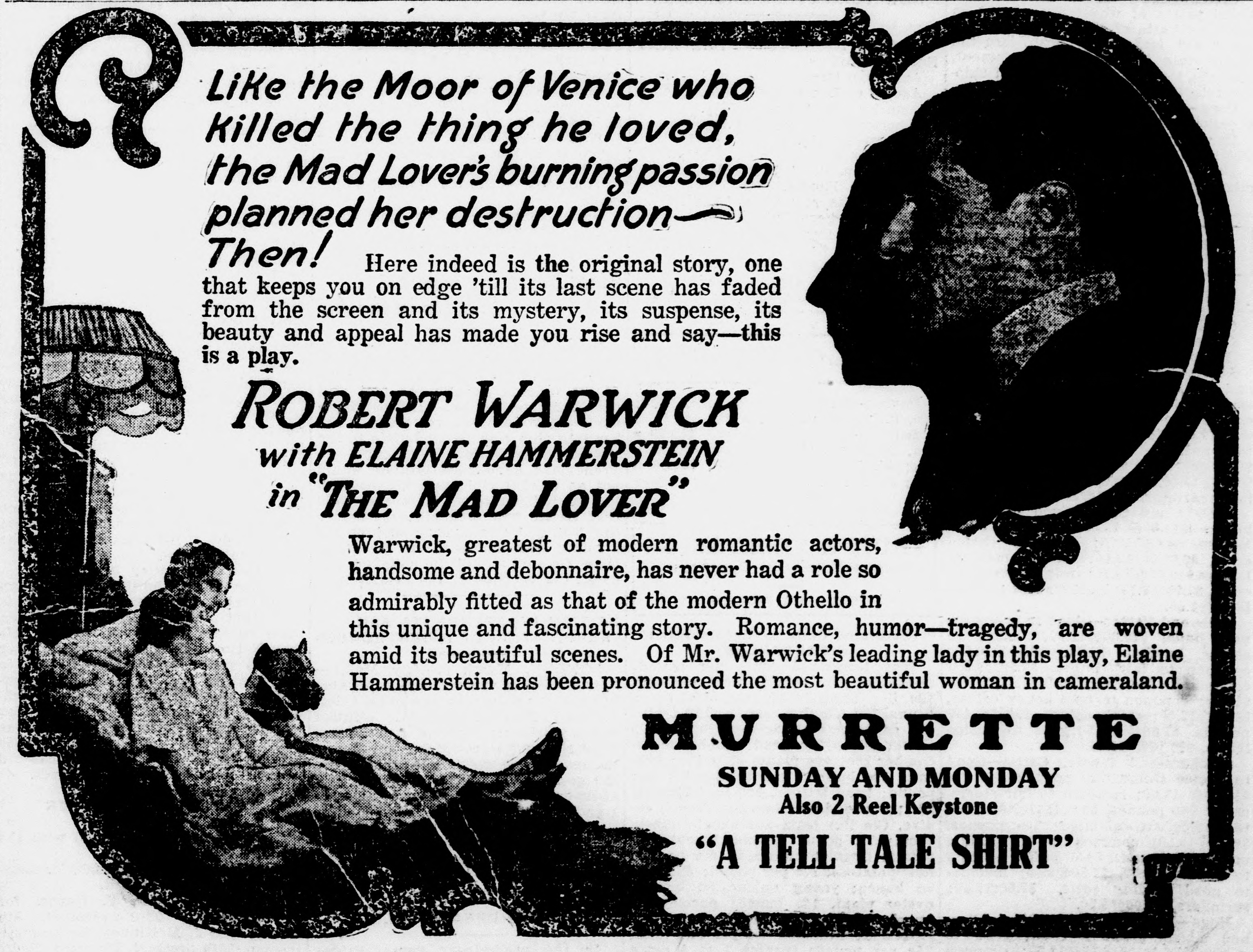
- Contemporary advertisement
- Directed by: Léonce Perret
- Written by: Léonce Perret
- Produced by: Harry Rapf
- Starring: Robert Warwick; Elaine Hammerstein; Valentine Petit
- Cinematography: Lucien N. Andriot
- Production companies: Robert Warwick Film; Harry Rapf Productions
- Distributed by: Pathé Exchange
- Release date: July 22, 1917
- Running time: 50 minutes
- Country: United States
- Languages: Silent; English intertitles

The Mad Lover, also known as A Modern Othello, is a 1917 American silent drama film directed by Léonce Perret and starring Robert Warwick, Elaine Hammerstein and Valentine Petit.

== Cast ==
- Robert Warwick as Robert Hyde
- Elaine Hammerstein as Clarice
- Valentine Petit as Mrs. Grosvenor
- Edward Kimball as The Pastor
- Georges Flateau as Count Vinzaglio
- Frank McGlynn Sr. as Lawyer Robertson

== Bibliography ==
- Robert B. Connelly. The Silents: Silent Feature Films, 1910-36, Volume 40, Issue 2. December Press, 1998.
