= Evidence (1922 film) =

1922 American silent film by George Archainbaud

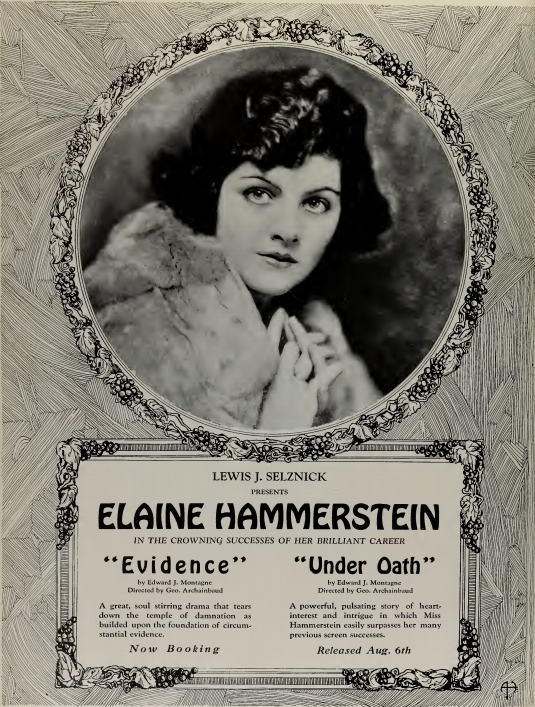
- Directed by: George Archainbaud
- Written by: Edward J. Montagne
- Produced by: Lewis J. Selznick
- Starring: Elaine Hammerstein; Niles Welch; Holmes Herbert
- Cinematography: John W. Brown; Jules Cronjager
- Production company: Selznick Pictures
- Distributed by: Selznick Pictures
- Release date: May 5, 1922
- Running time: 50 minutes
- Country: United States
- Languages: Silent; English intertitles

Evidence is a 1922 American silent drama film directed by George Archainbaud and starring Elaine Hammerstein, Niles Welch and Holmes Herbert.

== Cast ==
- Elaine Hammerstein as Florette
- Niles Welch as Phillip Rowland
- Holmes Herbert as Judge Rowland
- Constance Bennett as Edith
- Marie Burke as Mrs. Bascom
- Matilda Metevier as Louise
- Ernest Hilliard as Walter Stanley

== Bibliography ==
- Munden, Kenneth White. The American Film Institute Catalog of Motion Pictures Produced in the United States, Part 1. University of California Press, 1997.
