= Paint and Powder =

1925 film

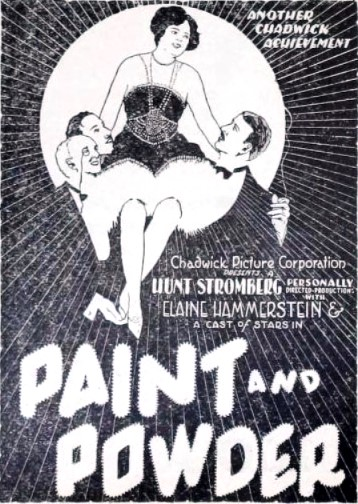
- Advertisement
- Directed by: Hunt Stromberg
- Written by: Harvey Gates (story, scenario); Frederick Hatton (titles); Fanny Hatton (titles)
- Starring: Elaine Hammerstein
- Cinematography: Sol Polito
- Edited by: Ralph Dixon
- Production company: Chadwick Pictures
- Distributed by: Chadwick Pictures; State's Rights
- Release date: September 16, 1925
- Running time: 70 minutes; 7 reels
- Country: United States
- Language: Silent (English intertitles)

Paint and Powder is a surviving 1925 American silent drama film produced and released by the Chadwick Pictures. The director of the film was Hunt Stromberg, later be best known as a producer and one of Louis B. Mayer's right hand men over at MGM. The star of this film is Elaine Hammerstein, sister of the music writer and granddaughter of the theatrical impresario, both named Oscar Hammerstein.

== Plot ==
As described in a film magazine review, a waiter in a cheap cabaret loves the premier dancer of the place, and when a noted theatrical producer visits the cabaret, the waiter by deft manipulation obtains his wallet. He dresses the young woman up and tries to put her on Broadway. Later the waiter is sent up the river. When he is released, he finds the young woman married and successful. He is heartbroken but does not try to win her back.

== Cast ==
- Elaine Hammerstein as Mary Dolan
- Theodore von Eltz as Jimmy Evarts
- Stuart Holmes as Phillip Andrews
- John St. Polis as Mark Kelsey
- Russell Simpson as Riley
- Charles Murray as Cabman
- Derelys Perdue as Mazie Hull
- Pat Hartigan as Tim McCardle
- Ernest Belcher as Dancing Master
- Mrs. Charles Craig as Mrs. Evarts
- Fred Kelsey as Detective (uncredited)
- Tom Ricketts as Old Man at Party (uncredited)
- Larry Steers as Party Guest (uncredited)

== Preservation ==
A print of Paint and Powder is held by the Library of Congress and in the George Eastman Museum Motion Picture Collection. It has also been released on DVD.
