= Santa Claus vs. Cupid =

- Directed by: Willard Louis
- Story by: Alan Crosland
- Starring: Raymond McKee; Guido Colucci; Mabel Dwight; Florence Stover
- Production company: Thomas A. Edison, Inc.
- Distributed by: General Film Company (1915); Grapevine Video (2010)
- Release date: 1915
- Running time: 16 minutes
- Country: United States
- Language: Silent

Santa Claus vs. Cupid is a 1915 silent American Christmas film.

== Storyline ==
Two men in Santa Claus suits are rivals for the love of the same woman. At the same time a desperate man becomes a thief at a Christmas party.

== Cast ==
- Raymond McKee - Dick Norwood
- Billy Casey - Edward Beck
- Guido Colucci - Binks Mulligan
- Edith Wright - Mrs. Mulligan
- Mabel Dwight - Mrs. Norwood
- Gladys Gane - Rachel Beck
- Florence Stover - Mrs. Beck
- Grace Morrissey - Helen Bower
- Margery Bonney Erskine - Mrs. Bower

== See also ==
- List of Christmas films
