= Edward J. Montagne =

British screenwriter

- Born: 18 May 1885; London, United Kingdom
- Died: 15 September 1932 (aged 47); Hollywood, California, United States
- Occupation: Writer
- Years active: 1911–1929 (film)

Edward J. Montagne (1885–1932) was a British screenwriter who worked in the American film industry during the silent era. He worked for Vitagraph for six years, eventually being poached by Selznick Pictures, and later working for Universal Pictures. He was the father of the producer and director Edward Montagne.

== Selected filmography ==
- The Wheels of Justice (1915)
- The Conflict (1916)
- Freddy's Narrow Escape (1916)
- The Maelstrom (1917)
- Sunlight's Last Raid (1917)
- The Message of the Mouse (1917)
- Hoarded Assets (1918)
- To the Highest Bidder (1918)
- The Man Who Won (1919)
- Out Yonder (1919)
- Children of Destiny (1920)
- The Daughter Pays (1920)
- Red Foam (1920)
- The Greatest Love (1920)
- The Point of View (1920)
- Chivalrous Charley (1921)
- Conceit (1921)
- A Man's Home (1921)
- The Last Door (1921)
- Remorseless Love (1921)
- Bucking the Tiger (1921)
- After Midnight (1921)
- The Miracle of Manhattan (1921)
- Evidence (1922)
- A Wide Open Town (1922)
- One Week of Love (1922)
- Under Oath (1922)
- Love's Masquerade (1922)
- Reckless Youth (1922)
- Channing of the Northwest (1922)
- The Common Law (1923)
- Rupert of Hentzau (1923)
- The Last of the Duanes (1924)
- Painted People (1924)
- The Storm Daughter (1924)
- Secrets of the Night (1924)
- Alias Mary Flynn (1925)
- The Combat (1926)
- The Mystery Club (1926)
- The Flaming Frontier (1926)
- The Cat and the Canary (1927)
- Surrender (1927)
- Shanghaied (1927)
- It Can Be Done (1929)
- The Love Trap (1929)

== Bibliography ==
- Kellow, Brian. The Bennetts: An Acting Family. University Press of Kentucky, 2004.
