= The Pleasure Seekers (1920 film) =

1920 film by George Archainbaud

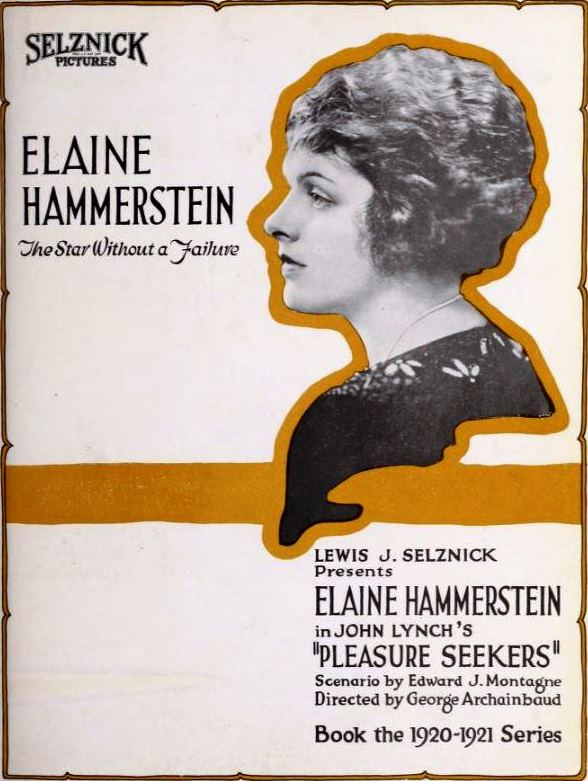
- Advertisement in Exhibitors Herald, 1921
- Directed by: George Archainbaud
- Written by: John Lynch (story); Edward J. Montagne (scenario)
- Starring: Elaine Hammerstein
- Production company: Selznick Pictures
- Distributed by: Select Pictures
- Release date: December 30, 1920
- Running time: 60 minutes
- Country: United States
- Language: Silent (English intertitles)

The Pleasure Seekers is a lost 1920 American silent drama film produced by Selznick Pictures and distributed by the Select Company. It was directed by George Archainbaud and stars Elaine Hammerstein.

== Plot ==
As summarized by a film publication, Craig Winchell (Campbell) is threatened with disownment by his wealthy father John Winchell (Currier) unless he gives up his wild ways, and particularly Mrs. Clara Marshall (Clayton), a divorcee with a rather tarnished reputation. Craig, determined to follow his father's wishes, leaves for a long motor trip. His automobile breaks down outside the home of Reverend Snowden (Furey) in a small town. There he meets Snowden's secretary, Mary Murdock (Hammerstein), and falls in love with her. The death of Snowden permits Mary to leave, and she and Craig are married. Craig brings his bride to meet his father, but John refuses to see her, imagining what type of woman his son would marry. Mary sets to win over the father, and takes a position as his secretary and completely captivates him. When he discovers that she is Craig's wife, he is overjoyed. It is then that Craig accidentally meets again Clara Marshall. With the lure of the gay life strong, he promises to attend her party the next night. Mary learns of the party and that her husband has lied to her about his whereabouts. When John threatens to go there and drag his son away, Mary says that it is her responsibility to get him. Dressed in the finest gown that John can buy, she goes to Clara's home. When Craig compares the two women face-to-face, his remorse is sincere as he appreciates the true value of the wife that he deceived.

== Cast ==
- Elaine Hammerstein as Mary Murdock
- James A. Furey as Snowden
- Webster Campbell as Craig Winchell
- Marguerite Clayton as Clara Marshall
- Frank Currier as John Winchell
