= Reckless Youth (1922 film) =

1922 film by Ralph Ince

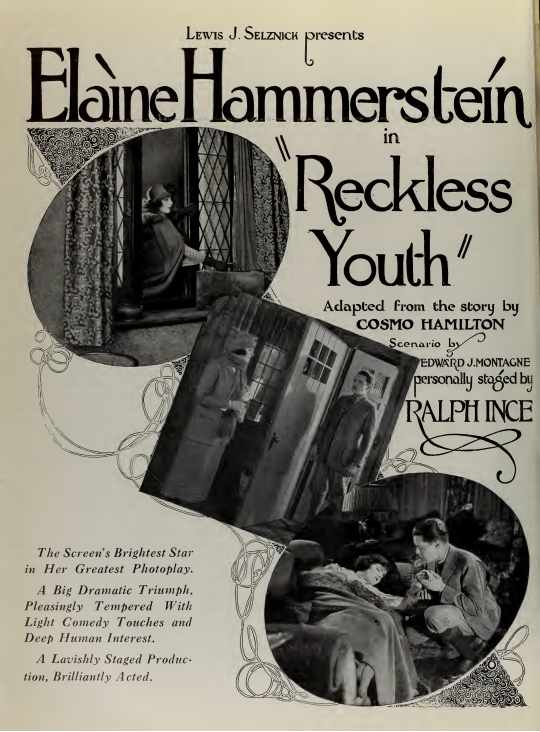
- Advertisement for the film in the Film Daily
- Directed by: Ralph Ince
- Written by: Cosmo Hamilton; Edward J. Montagne
- Produced by: Lewis J. Selznick
- Starring: Elaine Hammerstein; Niles Welch; Myrtle Stedman
- Cinematography: John W. Brown; Jules Cronjager
- Production company: Select Pictures
- Distributed by: Selznick Pictures
- Release date: March 22, 1922
- Running time: 60 minutes
- Country: United States
- Language: Silent (English intertitles)

Reckless Youth is a 1922 American silent drama film directed by Ralph Ince and starring Elaine Hammerstein, Niles Welch, and Myrtle Stedman.

== Plot ==
As described in a film magazine, Alice Schuyler (Hammerstein), a selfish flapper expelled from a convent school, goes to live with her crusty old aunt near New York City. Because of the restrictions placed on her, she runs away from home and finds shelter in the nearby home of John Carmen, a wealthy young bachelor. The only way out of the social difficulty that occurs to John is for them to get married. This they do and they live in his town house. Soon they begin to drift apart, she becoming infatuated with Harrison Thomby, a man about town, and a break finally comes when they meet at a cabaret. John goes to his county home and, in a mix up of taxi cabs, takes a chorus girl home with him. Alice arrives on the scene and refuses to listen to his explanations. She accepts an invitation from her friend and, while accompanying him to a dance, their taxi is wrecked and she is badly hurt. While unconscious, she dreams of being trapped on Harrison's yacht, and wakes to find herself in her husband's arms.

== Cast ==
- Elaine Hammerstein as Alice Schuyler
- Niles Welch as John Carmen
- Myrtle Stedman as Mrs. Schuyler-Foster
- Robert Lee Keeling as Mr. Schuyler-Foster
- Huntley Gordon as Harrison Thomby
- Louise Prussing as Mrs. Dahlgren
- Frank Currier as Cumberland Whipple
- Kate Cherry as Martha Whipple
- Constance Bennett as Chorus Girl

== Preservation ==
A tinted 35 mm print is held by the George Eastman Museum, from material by the New Zealand Film Archive. The print is incomplete, missing the first reel. Preservation was funded by a Save America's Treasures grant.

== Bibliography ==
- Munden, Kenneth White. The American Film Institute Catalog of Motion Pictures Produced in the United States, Part 1. University of California Press, 1997.
