= Whispers (1920 film) =

1920 film

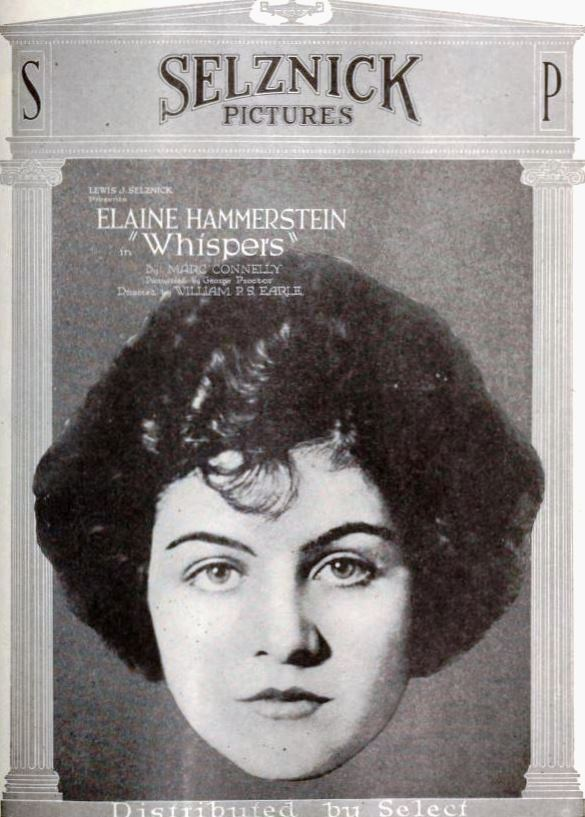
- Directed by: William P.S. Earle
- Written by: Marc Connelly; George DuBois Proctor
- Produced by: Lewis J. Selznick
- Starring: Elaine Hammerstein; Matt Moore; Charles K. Gerrard
- Cinematography: William F. Wagner
- Edited by: Cyril Gardner
- Production company: Selznick Pictures
- Distributed by: Selznick Pictures
- Release date: May 17, 1920
- Running time: 60 minutes
- Country: United States
- Languages: Silent; English intertitles

Whispers is a 1920 American silent drama film directed by William P.S. Earle and starring Elaine Hammerstein, Matt Moore and Charles K. Gerrard.

== Cast ==
- Elaine Hammerstein as Daphne Morton
- Matt Moore as Pat Darrick
- Phil Tead as Wesley Maced
- Charles K. Gerrard as . J. Dyke Summers
- Ida Darling as Aunt Carolina
- Bernard Randall as Shepley
- Warren Cook as Saxon
- Maude Hill as Marion Summers
- Templar Saxe as Parker

== Bibliography ==
- Connelly, Robert B. The Silents: Silent Feature Films, 1910-36, Volume 40, Issue 2. December Press, 1998.
- Munden, Kenneth White. The American Film Institute Catalog of Motion Pictures Produced in the United States, Part 1. University of California Press, 1997.
