= Rupert of Hentzau (1923 film) =

1923 film

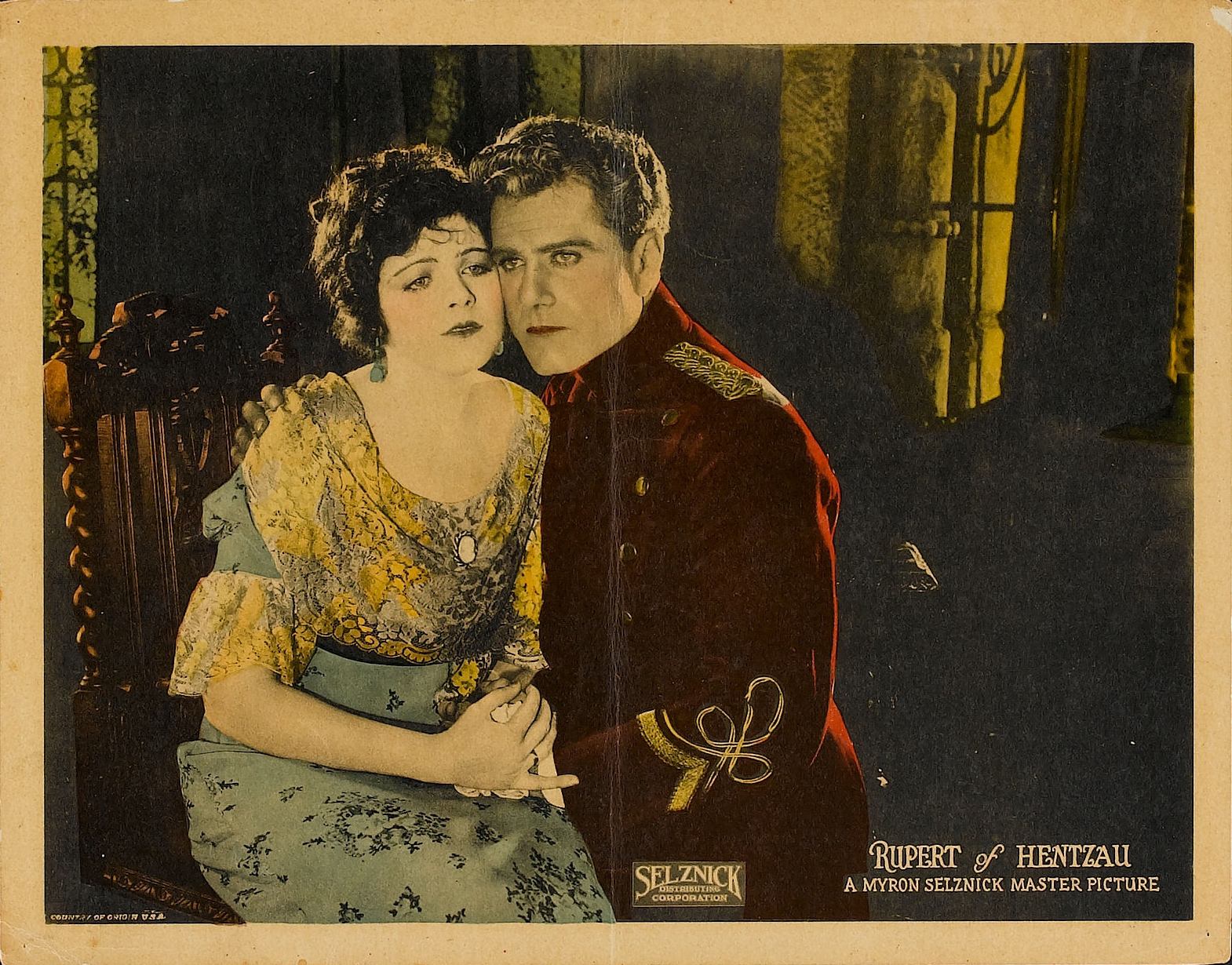
- Directed by: Victor Heerman
- Written by: Edward J. Montagne
- Based on: Rupert of Hentzau by Anthony Hope
- Produced by: Lewis J. Selznick
- Starring: Bert Lytell; Elaine Hammerstein; Lew Cody
- Cinematography: Glen MacWilliams; Harris Thorpe
- Production company: Selznick Pictures Corporation
- Distributed by: Selznick Distributing Corporation
- Release date: July 15, 1923
- Running time: 90 minutes
- Country: United States
- Language: Silent (English intertitles)

Rupert of Hentzau is a 1923 American silent adventure film directed by Victor Heerman and starring Bert Lytell, Elaine Hammerstein, and Lew Cody. It is an adaptation of Anthony Hope's 1898 novel Rupert of Hentzau, the sequel to The Prisoner of Zenda.

== Cast ==
- Bert Lytell as King of Ruritania / Rudolph Rassendyll
- Elaine Hammerstein as Queen Flavia
- Lew Cody as Rupert of Hentzau
- Claire Windsor as Countess Helga
- Hobart Bosworth as Col. Sapt
- Bryant Washburn as Count Fritz
- Marjorie Daw as Rosa Holf
- Mitchell Lewis as Bauer
- Adolphe Menjou as Count Rischenheim
- Elmo Lincoln as Simon
- Irving Cummings as Von Bernenstein
- Josephine Crowell as Mother Holf
- Nigel De Brulier as Herbert
- Gertrude Astor as Paula

== Preservation ==
With no prints of Rupert of Hentzau located in any film archives, it is a lost film.

== Bibliography ==
- Goble, Alan. The Complete Index to Literary Sources in Film. Walter de Gruyter, 1999.
