= Freddy's Narrow Escape =

- Directed by: Frank Currier
- Written by: Edward J. Montagne
- Produced by: Vitagraph Company of America
- Distributed by: General Film Company
- Release date: February 25, 1916
- Running time: 1 reel
- Country: USA
- Language: Silent..English titles

Freddy's Narrow Escape is a 1916 silent film comedy short directed by Frank Currier. It was produced by the Vitagraph Company of America and distributed by General Film Company.

== Cast ==
- William Dangman - Freddy
- Helen Gurney - Aunt Maria
- Daisy Devere - Rose Green
- Frank Currier - Judge Green
- Wilfred Lytell - The Minister (*as Wilfred Lytell Jr.)
