= Why Announce Your Marriage? =

1922 film directed by Alan Crosland

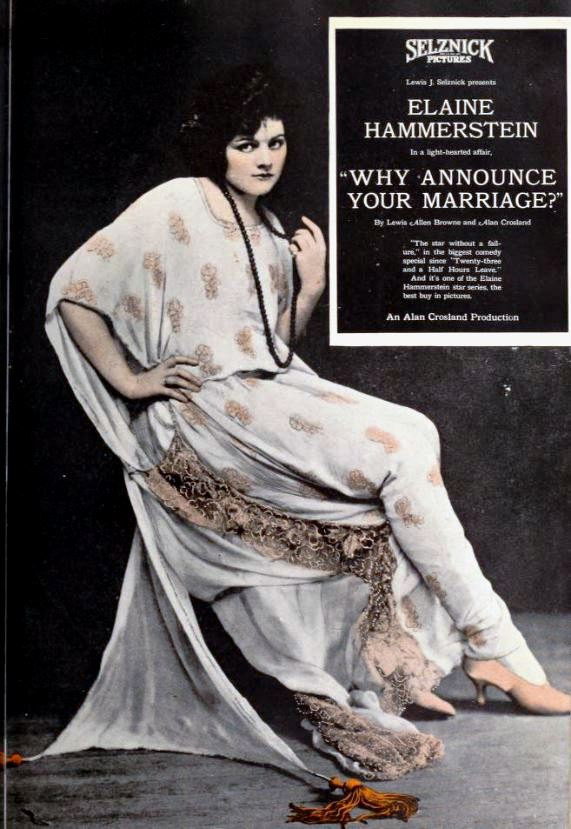
- Directed by: Alan Crosland
- Written by: Lewis Allen Browne; Alan Crosland
- Produced by: Lewis J. Selznick
- Starring: Elaine Hammerstein; Niles Welch; Arthur Housman
- Cinematography: William F. Wagner
- Production company: Selznick Pictures
- Distributed by: Select Pictures
- Release date: January 20, 1922
- Running time: 50 minutes
- Country: United States
- Languages: Silent; English intertitles

Why Announce Your Marriage? is a 1922 American silent comedy drama film directed by Alan Crosland and starring Elaine Hammerstein, Niles Welch and Arthur Housman.

== Cast ==
- Elaine Hammerstein as Arline Mayfair
- Niles Welch as Jimmy Winthrop
- Frank Currier as David Mayfair
- Arthur Housman as Teddy Filbert
- James Harrison as Bobby Kingsley
- Florence Billings as Widow Gushing
- Marie Burke as Mrs. Jerome
- Huntley Gordon as Mr. Walton
- Elizabeth Woodmere as Gladys Jerome

== Preservation status ==
The film is preserved in the BFI National Film and Television Archive, London.

== Bibliography ==
- Monaco, James. The Encyclopedia of Film. Perigee Books, 1991.
