= The Point of View =

1920 film directed by Alan Crosland

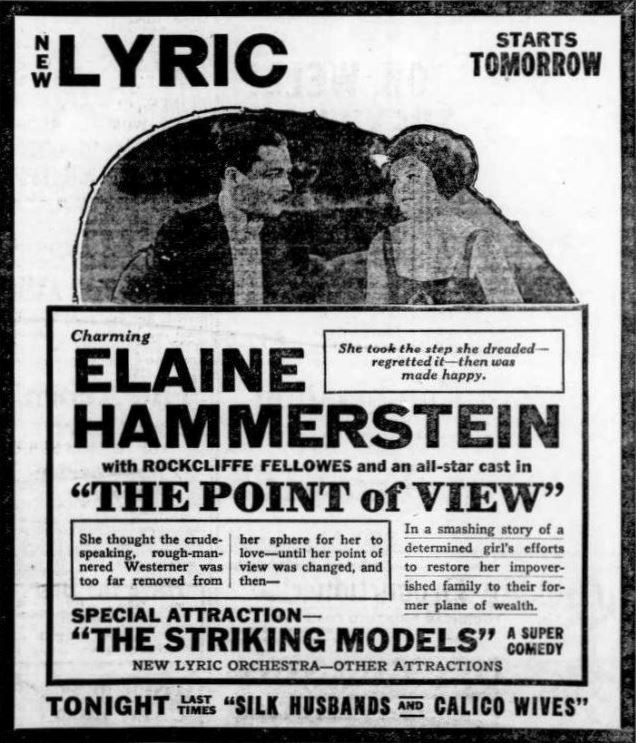
- Newspaper advertisement
- Directed by: Alan Crosland
- Written by: Edward J. Montagne
- Based on: The Point of View by Edith Ellis
- Starring: Elaine Hammerstein; Rockliffe Fellowes; Arthur Housman
- Cinematography: Oliver T. Marsh
- Production company: Selznick Pictures
- Distributed by: Select Pictures
- Release date: August 23, 1920
- Running time: 60 minutes
- Country: United States
- Language: Silent (English intertitles)

The Point of View is a 1920 American silent drama film directed by Alan Crosland and starring Elaine Hammerstein, Rockliffe Fellowes, and Arthur Housman.

== Cast ==
- Elaine Hammerstein as Marjory Thorncroft
- Rockliffe Fellowes as David Lawrence
- Arthur Housman as Dallas Henley
- Hugh Huntley as Lawrence Thorncroft
- Helen Lindroth as Aunt Caroline
- Cornish Beck as Maitland Thorncroft
- Warren Cook as Thorncroft, Sr.

== Preservation ==
With no listings for The Point of View in any film archive, it is a lost film.

== Bibliography ==
- Monaco, James. The Encyclopedia of Film. Perigee Books, 1991.
