= The Unwritten Law (1925 film) =

American silent crime film

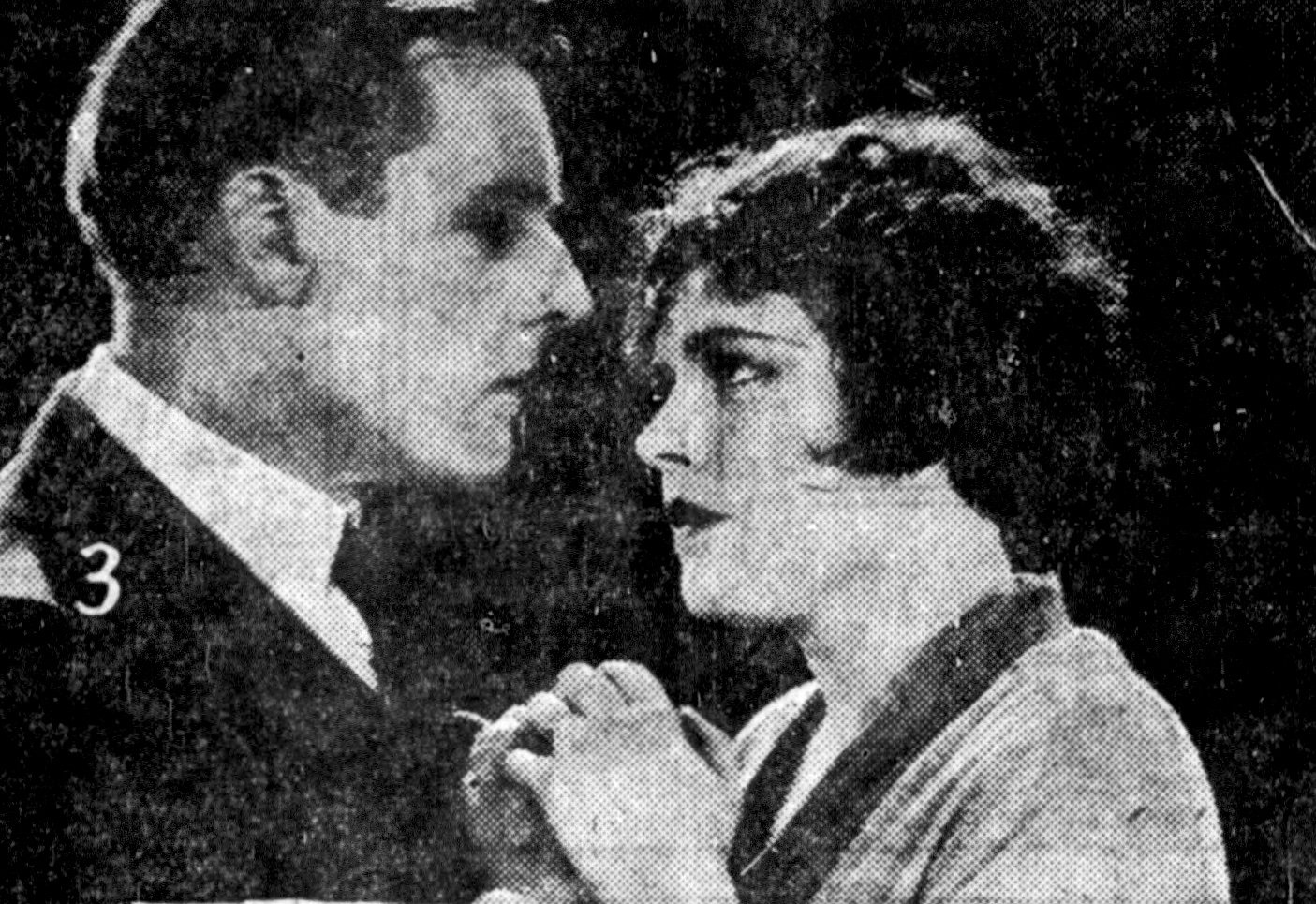
- Elaine Hammerstein and Forrest Stanley in a publicity photo for the film
- Directed by: Edward LeSaint
- Written by: Tom J. Hopkins (story, screenplay)
- Produced by: Columbia Pictures
- Starring: Elaine Hammerstein
- Cinematography: Frank B. Good
- Distributed by: Columbia Pictures
- Release date: August 1, 1925
- Running time: 65 minutes
- Country: United States
- Language: Silent (English intertitles)

The Unwritten Law is an extant 1925 American silent film crime melodrama directed by Edward LeSaint and starring Elaine Hammerstein. It was produced and distributed by Columbia Pictures. In the UK distribution was handled by Film Booking Offices of America.

Edward Lorusso produced the film for video in 2023 with a score by David Drazin.

== Cast ==
- Elaine Hammerstein - Helen Merritt
- Forrest Stanley - Jack Wayne
- William V. Mong - Colonel Merritt
- Mary Alden - Miss Grant
- Charles Clary - John Randall
- Johnny Fox - Office Boy
- William A. Carroll - Mr. Smart

== Preservation status ==
- Prints survive at the George Eastman Museum and the Library of Congress.
