= Frank Currier =

American actor (1857–1928)

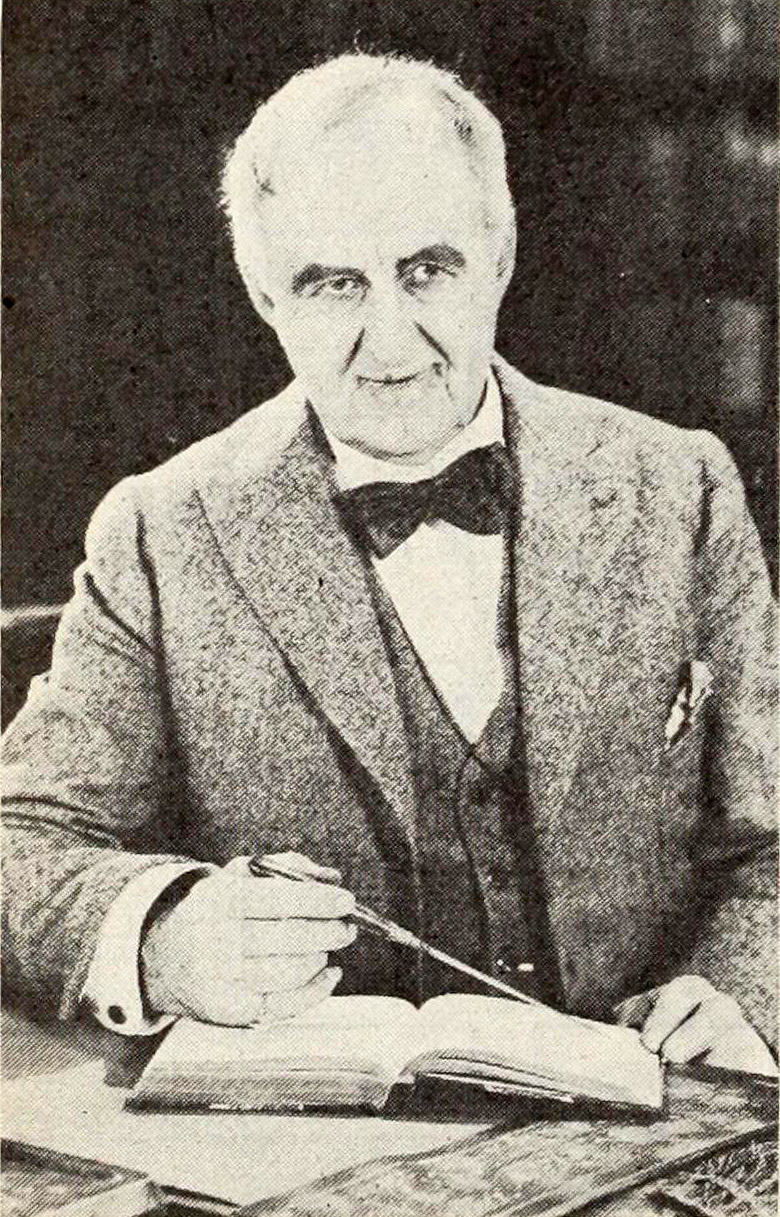
- Currier in 1921
- Born: September 4, 1857; Norwich, Connecticut, U.S.
- Died: April 22, 1928 (aged 70); Hollywood, California, U.S.
- Occupations: Film and stage actor, director
- Years active: 1912-1928
- Spouse: Ada Dow (?-1926) (her death)

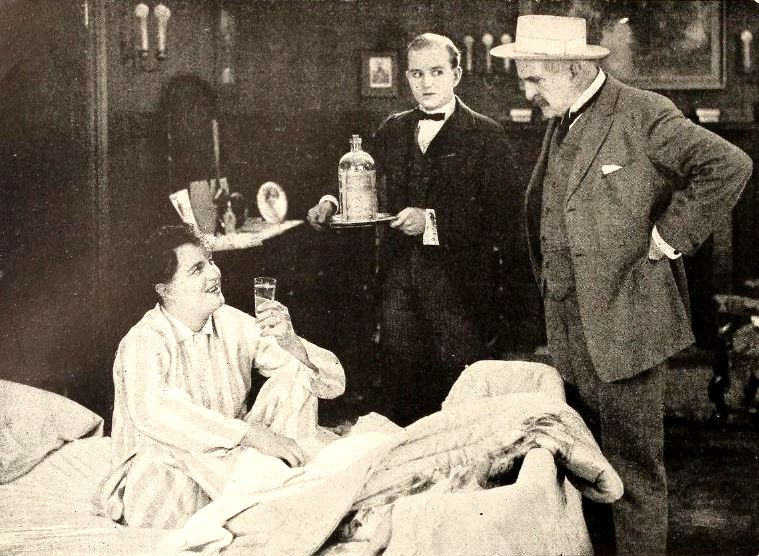
Bryant Washburn, Guy Oliver, and Currier in It Pays to Advertise (1919).

Frank Currier (September 4, 1857 – April 22, 1928) was an American film and stage actor and director of the silent era.

== Career ==
Similar to Theodore Roberts, Kate Lester, Ida Waterman, and William H. Crane, Currier had a long and successful stage career in the Victorian and Edwardian eras. His youth was spent honing his stagecraft. By the time he started appearing in silent films he was in his 50s and middle-aged. Currier, like Roberts, had a distinctive grandfatherly look as he aged and was respected and beloved by film audiences.

Currier appeared in more than 130 films between 1912 and 1928. He also directed 19 films in 1916. He is memorable in the 1925 film Ben-Hur as the Roman Admiral who adopts Judah Ben-Hur (Ramon Novarro) as his son after Ben-Hur saves his life during a battle at sea.

On Broadway, Currier performed in The Poor Little Rich Girl (1913), An Old New Yorker (1911), The Aviator (1910), Beethoven (1910), The Gay Life (1909), This Woman and This Man (1909), Way Down East (1905), The Winter's Tale (1904), Twelfth Night (1904), and Quo Vadis (1900).

== Selected filmography ==
- The Cross-Roads (1912)
- The Battle of Frenchman's Run (1915)
- Freddy's Narrow Escape (1916) (*dir. and act.)
- Fifty-Fifty (1916)
- The Conflict (1916)
- Panthea (1917)
- The End of the Tour (1917)
- His Father's Son (1917)
- Cassidy (1917)
- God's Law and Man's (1917)
- Her Father's Keeper (1917)
- Grafters (1917)
- Sowers and Reapers (1917)
- The Barricade (1917)
- The Greatest Power (1917)
- Outwitted (1917)
- Sylvia on a Spree (1917)
- The Trail of the Shadow (1917)
- The Duchess of Doubt (1917)
- The Brass Check (1918)
- The Winning of Beatrice (1918)
- To Hell with the Kaiser! (1918)
- A Successful Adventure (1918)
- His Bonded Wife (1918)
- With Neatness and Dispatch (1918)
- Opportunity (1918)
- The Red Lantern (1919)
- Peggy Does Her Darndest (1919)
- The Great Romance (1919)
- Her Kingdom of Dreams (1919)
- Almost Married (1919)
- The Brat (1919)
- It Pays to Advertise (1919)
- Satan Junior (1919)
- The Great Victory (1919)
- Blind Man's Eyes (1919)
- Easy to Make Money (1919)
- The Right of Way (1920)
- The Cheater (1920)
- Clothes (1920)
- The Pleasure Seekers (1920)
- The Rookie's Return (1920)
- The Misleading Lady (1920)
- The Man Who (1921)
- Clay Dollars (1921)
- A Message from Mars (1921)
- Why Announce Your Marriage? (1922)
- Reckless Youth (1922)
- The Woman Who Fooled Herself (1922)
- My Old Kentucky Home (1922)
- The Snitching Hour (1922)
- The Lights of New York (1922)
- The Victor (1923)
- Desire (1923)
- The Tents of Allah (1923)
- The Sea Hawk (1924)
- Being Respectable (1924)
- The Trouble Shooter (1924)
- The Heart Buster (1924)
- The Red Lily (1924)
- The Family Secret (1924)
- Graustark (1925)
- The White Desert (1925)
- The Great Love (1925)
- Ben-Hur (1925) - Arrius
- The Big Parade (1925)
- La Bohème (1926)
- The Exquisite Sinner (1926)
- Tell It to the Marines (1926)
- The Enemy (1927)
- The Callahans and the Murphys (1927)
- Across to Singapore (1928)
