= Robert Ellis (actor, born 1892) =

American actor (1889–1959)

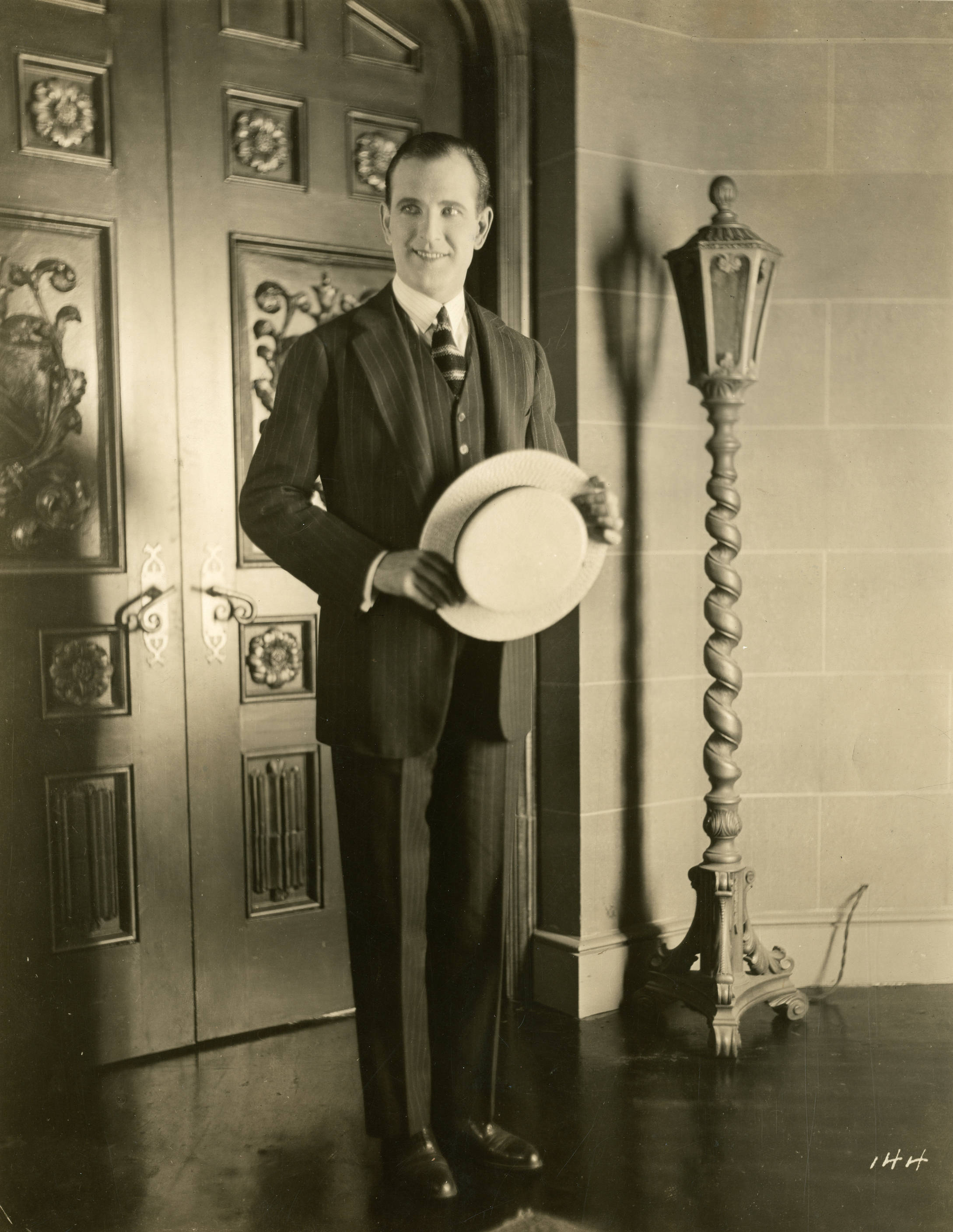
- Ellis in 1924
- Born: Robert Ellis Reel; June 27, 1892; New York City, U.S.
- Died: December 29, 1974 (aged 82); Santa Monica, California, U.S.
- Resting place: Inglewood Park Cemetery
- Occupations: Actor; Screenwriter; Director
- Years active: 1913–1969
- Spouses: May Allison (m. 1920; div. 1923) Vera Reynolds (m. 1926; div. 1938) Helen Logan (m. 1962)

Robert Ellis Reel (June 27, 1892 – December 29, 1974), known professionally as Robert Ellis, was an American film actor, screenwriter and film director. He appeared in more than 160 films between 1913 and 1934. He also wrote for 65 films and directed 61.

== Biography ==
Ellis was born in Brooklyn, New York, on June 27, 1892, and he attended St. Francis Xavier College in New York City.

Ellis's wives included actresses May Allison and Vera Reynolds and screenwriter Helen Logan. He and Logan wed in 1962, following Reynolds's death. His relationship with Reynolds drew public attention in 1938 as a lawsuit ended when the two decided to marry. Reynolds had sued Ellis for $180,000 for breach of promise, asserting that after their 1926 marriage in Greenwich, Connecticut, was found to be invalid, he had promised to marry her but failed to follow through. After a month's hearing, their decision to marry ended the litigation.

On Broadway, Ellis portrayed Dan Huntley in Baxter's Partner (1911). Ellis acted for Kalem and Metro film studios. He was the leading man in the film For Sale (1924), but he often portrayed villains. After acting, he became a screenwriter whose scripts were used in films of Charlie Chan, Jane Withers, and others. He also directed films, including A Fool and His Money and The Figurehead.

On December 29, 1974, Ellis died in Santa Monica, California. He and Logan are buried in adjacent graves in Inglewood Park Cemetery in Inglewood, California.

== Selected filmography ==
- The Apaches of Paris (1915) - Darcelle
- The Glory of Youth (1915) - Hal Crofton - an Athlete
- The Customary Two Weeks (1917) - George Extell
- The Lifted Veil (1917) - Leslie Palliser
- Brown of Harvard (1918) - 'Bud' Hall
- In for Thirty Days (1919) - Brett Page
- Peggy Does Her Darndest (1919) - Honorable Hugh Wentworth
- Upstairs and Down (1919) - Terrence O'Keefe
- Louisiana (1919) - Laurence Ferol
- The Third Kiss (1919) - Rupert Bawlf
- The Spite Bride (1919) - Billy Swayne
- The Tiger's Trail (1919)
- The Imp (1919)
- The Figurehead (1920) - Director
- The Daughter Pays (1920) - Gerald Roseborough
- Handcuffs or Kisses (1921) - Peter Madison
- Ladies Must Live (1921) - Anthony Mulvain
- Wild Honey (1922) - Kerry Burgess
- Chivalrous Charley (1921)
- Love's Masquerade (1922) - Herbert Norwooood
- The Dangerous Little Demon (1922) - Gary McVeigh
- The Infidel (1922) - Cyrus Flint
- Hurricane's Gal (1922) - Steele O'Connor
- The Woman Who Fooled Herself (1922) - Fernando Pennington
- Anna Ascends (1922) - Howard Fisk
- Dark Secrets (1923) - Lord Wallington
- The Flame of Life (1923) - Fergus Derrick
- Mark of the Beast (1923) - Dr. David Hale
- The Wild Party (1923) - Basil Wingate / Stuart Furth
- The Wanters (1923) - Elliot Worthington
- The Law Forbids (1924) - Paul Remsen
- For Sale (1924) - Alan Penfield
- Lovers' Lane (1924) - Dr. Tom Singletoon
- Silk Stocking Sal (1924) - Bob Cooper
- On Probation (1924) - Bruce Winter
- A Cafe in Cairo (1924) - Barry Braxton
- Capital Punishment (1925) - Harry Phillip
- Forbidden Cargo (1925) - Jerry Burke
- Speed (1925) - Nat Armstrong Jr.
- Defend Yourself (1925) - Dr. Poole
- Lady Robinhood (1925) - Hugh Winthrop
- The Part-time Wife (1925) - Kenneth Scott
- Northern Code (1925) - Louis Le Blanc
- S.O.S. Perils of the Sea (1925) - Ralph Seldon
- The Girl from Montmartre (1926) - Jack Ewing
- Ladies of Leisure (1926) - Jack Forrest
- Brooding Eyes (1926) - Phillip Mott
- Whispering Canyon (1926) - Bob Cameron
- Devil's Dice (1926) - Larry Bannon
- Lure of the Night Club (1927) - John Stone
- Ragtime (1927) - Steve Martin, a.k.a. 'Slick'
- The Law and the Man (1928) - Ernest Vane
- Marry the Girl (1928) - Harry Wayland
- The Law's Lash (1928) - Corporal Ted Campbell
- Varsity (1928) - Rod Luke
- Freedom of the Press (1928) - Cyrus Hazlett
- Restless Youth (1928) - Robert Haines
- Broadway (1929) - Steve Crandall
- The Love Trap (1929) - Guy Emory
- Tonight at Twelve (1929) - Jack Keith
- Night Parade (1929) - Mr. John W. Zelli
- Undertow (1930) - Jim Paine
- What Men Want (1930) - Howard LeMoyne
- The Squealer (1930) - Valleti
- Caught Cheating (1931) - Joe Cabrone
- The Last Parade (1931) - A.C. Marino
- Aloha (1931) - Larry Leavitt
- The Fighting Sheriff (1931) - Flash Halloway
- The Good Bad Girl (1931) - Dapper Dan Tyler
- Dancing Dynamite (1931) - Lucas
- Murder at Midnight (1931) - Duncan Channing
- Is There Justice? (1931) - Dan Lawrence
- Mounted Fury (1931) - Paul Marsh
- The Deadline (1931) - Ira Coleman
- The Devil Plays (1931) - Stiles
- One Man Law (1932) - Jonathan P. Streeter
- The Fighting Fool (1932) - Crip Mason
- Behind Stone Walls (1932) - Jack Keene - Man-about-Town
- Scandal for Sale (1932) - Hotel Resident (uncredited)
- A Man's Land (1932) - John Thomas
- Daring Danger (1932) - Hugo DuSang
- American Madness (1932) - Dude Finlay (uncredited)
- The Phantom Express (1932) - Reynolds
- The Last Man (1932) - English Charlie
- Broadway to Cheyenne (1932) - Butch Owens
- Come On Danger! (1932) - Frank Sanderson
- The All American (1932) - Walter Grant
- White Eagle (1932) - Jim Gregory
- Slightly Married (1932) - Brandon
- Speed Demon (1932) - Langard
- Women Won't Tell (1932) - District Attorney
- Call Her Savage (1932) - Hotel Manager (uncredited)
- Officer Thirteen (1932) - Jack Blake
- The Penal Code (1932) - James Forrester
- The Monster Walks (1932, writer)
- Treason (1933) - Col. Jedcott
- Reform Girl (1933) - Kellar
- The Constant Woman (1933) - Leading Man
- Soldiers of the Storm (1933) - Moran
- The Thrill Hunter (1933) - Al Blake
- The Sphinx (1933) - Inspector James Riley
- The Important Witness (1933) - Jack (Duke) Farnham
- Police Call (1933) - Police Chief Crown
- Notorious But Nice (1933) - Prosecuting Attorney
- Only Yesterday (1933) - (uncredited)
- In the Money (1933, writer)
- Dance Girl Dance (1933, writer)
- I've Got Your Number (1934) - Turk Garrison
- Madame Spy (1934) - Sulkin
- Dancing Man (1934) - Cavendish
- Gambling Lady (1934) - Mr. Carter - Lawyer (uncredited)
- A Very Honorable Guy (1934) - Gangster (uncredited)
- Now I'll Tell (1934) - Minor Role (uncredited)
- Friends of Mr. Sweeney (1934) - Casino Manager (uncredited)
- A Girl of the Limberlost (1934) - Frank Comstock
- Kid Millions (1934) - Desert Rider (uncredited) (final film role)
- In Love with Life (1934, writer)
- Charlie Chan in Egypt (1935, writer)
- The Jones Family in Big Business (1937, writer)
- Sun Valley Serenade (1941, writer)
- Iceland (1942, writer)
- Hello, Frisco, Hello (1943, writer)
- El Paso (1949, writer)
- Peter Pan (1953, writer)
