= One Week of Love =

1922 silent film

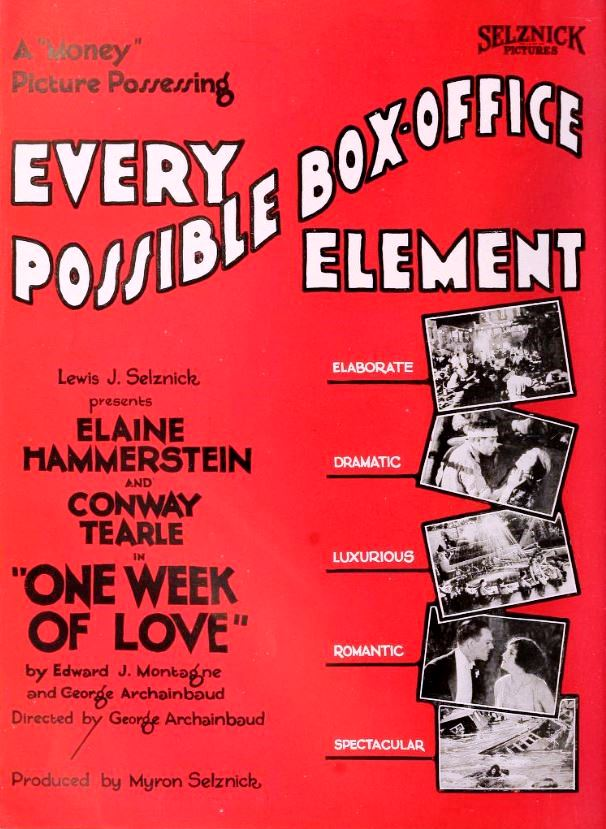
- Directed by: George Archainbaud
- Written by: George Archainbaud; Edward J. Montagne
- Produced by: Myron Selznick; Lewis J. Selznick
- Starring: Elaine Hammerstein; Conway Tearle; Kate Lester
- Cinematography: Jules Cronjager
- Edited by: Howard Bretherton
- Production company: Selznick Pictures
- Distributed by: Selznick Pictures
- Release date: November 1922
- Running time: 70 minutes
- Country: United States
- Languages: Silent; English intertitles

One Week of Love is a 1922 American silent drama film directed by George Archainbaud and starring Elaine Hammerstein, Conway Tearle and Kate Lester.

== Cast ==
- Elaine Hammerstein as Beth Wynn
- Conway Tearle as Buck Fearnley
- Kate Lester as Honoria Van Dyke
- Hallam Cooley as Francis Fraser
- Billie Dove as Bathing Party Guest

== Bibliography ==
- Munden, Kenneth White. The American Film Institute Catalog of Motion Pictures Produced in the United States, Part 1. University of California Press, 1997.
