= Handcuffs or Kisses =

1921 film

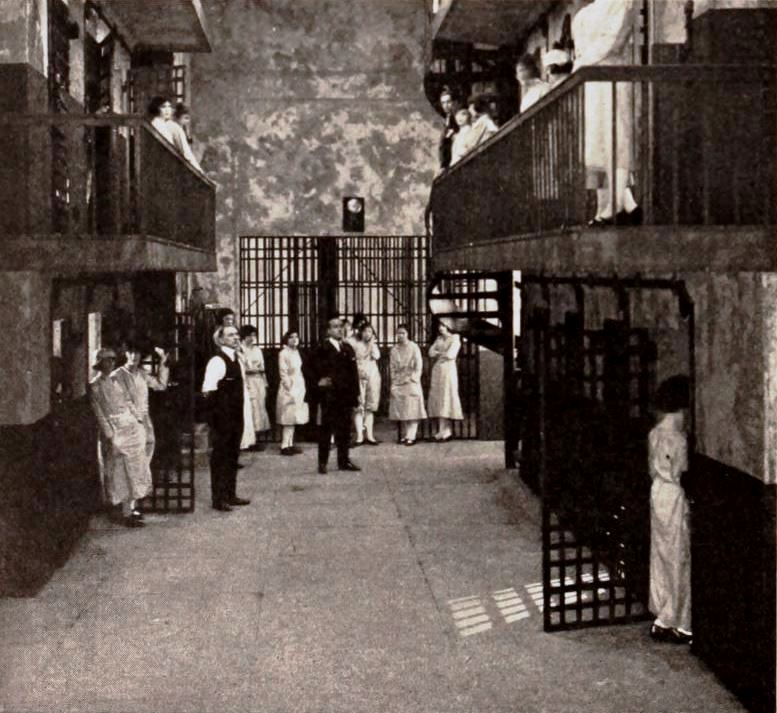
- Film still
- Directed by: George Archainbaud
- Written by: Lewis Allen Browne; Thomas Edgelow(story)
- Produced by: Lewis J. Selznick
- Starring: Elaine Hammerstein; Julia Swayne Gordon; Dorothy Chappell
- Cinematography: Jules Cronjager
- Production company: Selznick Pictures Corporation
- Distributed by: Select Pictures Corporation
- Release date: September 5, 1921
- Running time: 60 minutes
- Country: United States
- Language: Silent (English intertitles)

Handcuffs or Kisses is a 1921 American silent drama film directed by George Archainbaud and starring Elaine Hammerstein, Julia Swayne Gordon, and Dorothy Chappell. It was future Hollywood star Ronald Colman's first film in America. This is presumed to be a lost film.

== Plot ==
As described in a film magazine, Lois Walton (Hammerstein) is sent to a reformatory by scheming relatives and when she protests of the ill treatment of a weaker sister, she is flogged and dipped in ice cold baths. An investigation into the institution's affairs is conducted but the inmates are intimidated and dare not testify against the matron. Doris is sent to the home of a physician as a domestic worker, but she leaves after the doctor attempts to embrace her. She is befriended by a lawyer on the investigating committee, but, fearing to compromise him, she again escapes and is given a home by a woman that runs a gambling den. The young lawyer runs into her again and offers her marriage and a home, which she accepts.

== Cast ==
- Elaine Hammerstein as Lois Walton
- Julia Swayne Gordon as Mrs. Walton
- Dorothy Chappell as Violet
- Robert Ellis as Peter Madison
- Alison Skipworth as Miss Strodd
- Florence Billings as Miss Dell
- Ronald Schabel as Leo Carstairs
- George Lessey as Elias Pratt
- Ronald Colman as Lodyard

== Bibliography ==
- Richard Koszarski. Hollywood on the Hudson: Film and Television in New York from Griffith to Sarnoff. Rutgers University Press, 2008.
