= Niles Welch =

American actor (1888–1976)

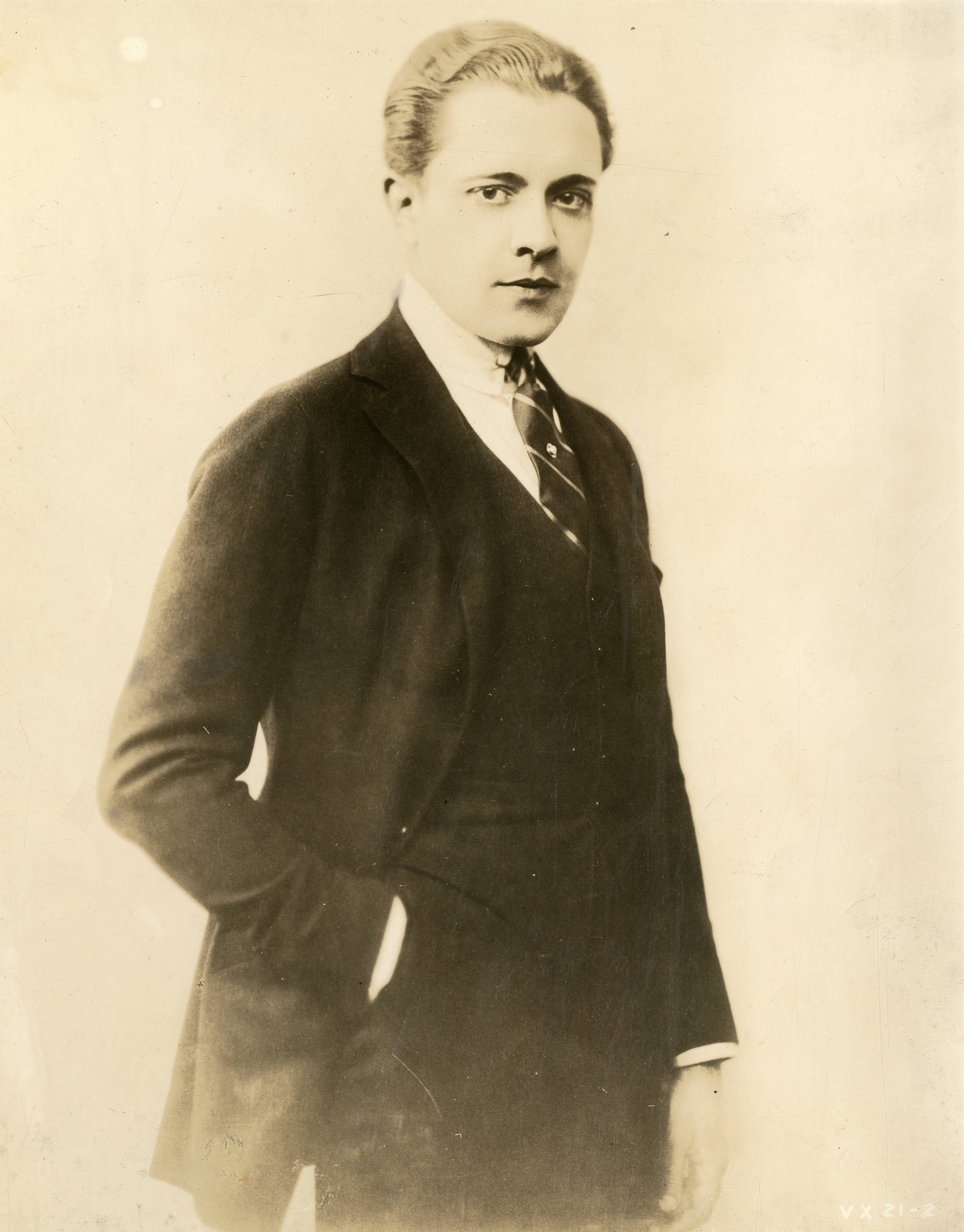
- Niles Welch in 1920
- Born: Niles Eugene Welch; July 29, 1888; Hartford, Connecticut, U.S.
- Died: November 21, 1976 (aged 88); Laguna Niguel, California, U.S.
- Occupation: Actor
- Years active: 1913–1940
- Spouse: Elaine Baker

Niles Eugene Welch (July 29, 1888 – November 21, 1976) was an American performer on Broadway, and a leading man in a number of silent and early talking motion pictures from the early 1910s through the 1930s.

== Early life ==
A native of Hartford, Connecticut, after graduating from St. Paul's School, Welch attended Yale and Columbia University. Later he joined a stock company, and from there toured the U.S. in vaudeville. The first film he worked in was The Stranger in Grey with the Eastern Vitagraph Studios.

== Career ==
After spending four years on the legitimate stage, Welch started his screen career appearing with World Film Corporation, Universal, Pathé Studios and Goldwyn Pictures. Among his earliest works were two Thomas Ince productions, Stepping Out and The Cup of Life, followed in rapid succession by Miss George Washington, with Marguerite Clark; The Courage of Marge O'Doone, with Pauline Starke; and with Grace Darmond in The Gulf Between (1917), the first feature film produced in the two-strip version of Technicolor. His career continued well into the sound era but mainly in bit roles.

Welch was the announcer for Columbia's American School of the Air on CBS radio in 1939. During World War II, he made foreign-language broadcasts for the Voice of America (VOA), using his fluency in French and German. He had his own program on VOA in addition to participating in daily broadcasts on the short-wave broadcasts to Europe. In 1945, a door at the VOA studio in New York hit Welch on his forehead, causing both retinas to detach. He lost sight in one eye and had partial vision in the other eye for one year, after which he became totally blind.

On Broadway, Welch portrayed David Cornish in The Donovan Affair (1926).

== Personal life and death ==
Welch was married to actress Elaine Baker. He died in Laguna Niguel, California, on November 21, 1976, at age 88.

== Selected filmography ==
- One Good Joke Deserves Another (1913, Short)
- Love's Quarantine (1913, Short) – False Policeman
- The Carpenter (1913, Short)
- The Only Way (1913, Short)
- Our Wives (1913, Short) – Stanton
- A Royal Family (1915)
- Emmy of Stork's Nest (1915) – Benton Cabot
- A Yellow Streak (1915) – Tom Austin
- Merely Mary Ann (1916)
- The Kiss of Hate (1916, *lost film) – Paul Turgeneff
- The Crucial Test (1916, *lost film) – Vance Holden
- Behind the Veil (1916, Short) – Wilbur Steele
- The Garden of Shadows (1916, Short) – The Father
- Miss George Washington (1916, *lost film) – Cleverley Trafton
- One of Many (1917) – Harold Templeton
- The Gulf Between (1917, *lost film, only very short fragments survive) – Richard Farrell
- The Secret of the Storm Country (1917, *lost film) – Frederick Graves
- Shame (1917) – Donald Strong
- The Gates of Gladness (1918) – Myron Leeds
- Her Boy (1918, *lost film) – David Morrison
- The Face in the Dark (1918) – Richard Grant
- Jane Goes A-Wooing (1919, *lost film) – Monty Lyman
- The Winning Girl (1919, *lost film) – Stanley Templeton
- Reclaimed: The Struggle for a Soul Between Love and Hate (1919) – Frank Truman
- Little Comrade (1919, *lost film) – Bobbie Hubbard
- The Law of Men (1919, *lost film) – Denis Connors
- The Virtuous Thief (1919, *lost film) – Bobbie Baker
- Stepping Out (1919, *unknown/presumably lost) – Robert Hillary
- Beckoning Roads (1919) – Humphrey Wells
- The Luck of Geraldine Laird (1920, *lost film) – Dean Laird
- The Courage of Marge O'Doone (1920, *lost film) – David Raine
- The Spenders (1921) – P. Percival Bines
- Reputation (1921, *lost film) – Jimmie Dorn
- Who Am I? (1921) – Jimmy Weaver
- The Cup of Life (1921) – Roy Bradley or Warren Bradford
- Remorseless Love (1921) – Enoch Morrison
- The Sin of Martha Queed (1921) – Arnold Barry
- The Way of a Maid (1921) – Thomas Lawlor
- Why Announce Your Marriage? (1922) – Jimmy Winthrop
- Reckless Youth (1922) – John Carmen
- Evidence (1922) – Phillip Rowland
- Under Oath (1922) – Hartley Peters
- Rags to Riches (1922) – Dumbbell – a.k.a. Ralph Connor
- Who Are My Parents? (1922) – Ken (her son)
- What Wives Want (1923) – David Loring
- Sawdust (1923) – Phillip Lessoway
- The Six-Fifty (1923, *lost film) – Mark Rutherford
- The Whispered Name (1924) – John Manning
- My Man (1924) – Dicky Reynolds
- The Right of the Strongest (1924) – Austin Jr.
- Wine of Youth (1924) – Robert (1897 prologue)
- Virtue's Revolt (1924) – Steve Marbridge
- Dangerous Pleasure (1924) – Alan Gordon
- Scandal Street (1925) – Neil Keenly / Harrison Halliday
- Fear-Bound (1925) – Tod Vane
- The Girl on the Stairs (1925) – Frank Farrell
- Lying Wives (1925) – Wallace Graham Jr
- A Little Girl in a Big City (1925) – Jack McGuire
- Ermine and Rhinestones (1925) – Billy Kershaw
- The Substitute Wife (1925) – Lawrence Sinton
- In Borrowed Plumes (1926) – Philip Dean
- The Virgin Wife (1926) – Thomas Lattimer
- The Men Women Love (1926) – Keith
- Faithful Wives (1926) – Charles Austin
- Spider Webs (1927) – Bert Grantland
- Carry on, Sergeant! (1928, Canadian) – Donald Cameron
- Hell Divers (1931) – Lt. Commander Standing Next to Captain (uncredited)
- The Phantom (1931) – Sam Crandall
- Convicted (1931) – Roy Fenton
- Manhattan Parade (1931) – Frank Harriman (uncredited)
- The Rainbow Trail (1932) – Willets
- Cross-Examination (1932) – Warren Slade
- Border Devils (1932) – Tom Hope
- The Famous Ferguson Case (1932) – Jeff Haines—Reporter (uncredited)
- Cornered (1932) – Moody Pierson
- McKenna of the Mounted (1932) – Morgan
- The Night Club Lady (1932) – Dr. Baldwin (uncredited)
- Come On, Tarzan (1932) – Steve Frazier
- A Scarlet Week-End (1932) – The Wife's Former Fiancée
- Silver Dollar (1932) – Congressman William Jennings Bryan (uncredited)
- Sundown Rider (1932) – Houseman – Banker
- The Mysterious Rider (1933) – John Foster
- The Constant Woman (1933) – Hotel Clerk (uncredited)
- Zoo in Budapest (1933) – Mr. Vandor
- The Lone Avenger (1933) – Martin Carter
- Dangerous Crossroads (1933) – Gang Member
- The Wolf Dog (1933) – Mason
- The Women in His Life (1933) – Pinball Spectator (uncredited)
- Let's Fall in Love (1933) – Archie Frost (uncredited)
- The Fighting Code (1933) – Crosby (uncredited)
- Massacre (1934) – Arena Announcer (uncredited)
- This Side of Heaven (1934) – Druggist (uncredited)
- The Show-Off (1934) – Ship #2 Officer (uncredited)
- I Believed in You (1934) – Painter (uncredited)
- Cross Streets (1934) – Jerry Clement
- Whom the Gods Destroy (1934) – Forrester Associate (uncredited)
- We're Rich Again (1934) – Guest on Yacht (uncredited)
- Here Comes the Navy (1934) – USS Arizona Officer (uncredited)
- The Count of Monte Cristo (1934) – De Villefort's Agent (uncredited)
- Tomorrow's Youth (1934) – Mr. Hall's Attorney
- Jealousy (1934) – Police Doctor (uncredited)
- The Secret Bride (1934) – Senate Clerk (uncredited)
- Death Flies East (1935) – Simpson (uncredited)
- Living on Velvet (1935) – Major's Aide (uncredited)
- Stone of Silver Creek (1935) – Rev. Timothy Tucker
- The Miracle Rider (1935) – Metzger
- Air Hawks (1935) – McCoy – Dispatcher (uncredited)
- Stranded (1935) – Safety Engineer (uncredited)
- Riding Wild (1935) – Clay Stevens
- Shipmates Forever (1935) – Naval Academy Entrance Examiner (uncredited)
- Music Is Magic (1935) – Film Director (uncredited)
- The Ivory-Handled Gun (1935) – Pat Moore as a young man
- The Singing Vagabond (1935) – Judge Forsythe Lane
- The Story of Louis Pasteur (1935) – Courier with Letter (uncredited)
- Wife vs. Secretary (1936) – Tom Axel (uncredited)
- Foolproof (1936, Short) – John Harwood
- The First Baby (1936) – Father in Park (uncredited)
- Gentle Julia (1936) – Book Salesman (uncredited)
- The Country Beyond (1936) – Party Guest (uncredited)
- For the Service (1936) – Parson (uncredited)
- Mary of Scotland (1936) – Minor Role (uncredited)
- To Mary – with Love (1936) – Secretary
- What Becomes of the Children? (1936) – Thomas Scott
- Empty Saddles (1936) – Jasper Kade
- Thirst Aid (1937, Short) – Nails Dolan
- The Purple Vigilantes (1938)
- Boy in Court (1940, Short) – Narrator (final film role)
