= Broadway to Cheyenne =

1932 film

- Theatrical poster
- Directed by: Harry L. Fraser
- Written by: Wellyn Totman (story and adaptation) & Harry L. Fraser (story and adaptation)
- Produced by: Trem Carr (producer)
- Starring: See below
- Cinematography: Archie Stout
- Edited by: Carl Pierson
- Production company: Monogram Pictures
- Release date: 1932
- Running time: 60 minutes
- Country: United States
- Language: English

Broadway to Cheyenne is a 1932 American pre-Code Western film directed by Harry L. Fraser. The film is also known as From Broadway to Cheyenne (American poster title). The film successfully combines the Western with the gangster film and vigilante film.

== Plot ==
A young and honest New York Police Department detective "Breezy" Kildare is attempting to arrest B.H. "Butch" Owens, the leader of a gang of criminals who attempted to bribe him. He is wounded in a shootout between Owens' gang and another gang in a Broadway night club.

His police chief allows him to recuperate and cool down in his thirst for justice back in his home of Wyoming where his father is a cattleman. Once arriving back home he soon discovers the gangsters who attempted to bribe and kill him are lying low there and diversifying by starting a Cattleman's Benevolent Association that is actually a protection racket protecting the cattlemen from such perils as having their cattle machine gunned.

When his father is shot in a drive-by shooting, Breezy leads the cattlemen against the well-armed gangsters who no longer have the power of a bribed administration or high-powered legal protection, but now have to face six-gun justice and lynch law.

== Cast ==
- Rex Bell as "Breezy" Kildare
- Marceline Day as Ruth Carter
- Matthew Betz as Joe Carter
- Robert Ellis as B.H. "Butch" Owens
- George 'Gabby' Hayes as Walrus
- Huntley Gordon as New York City Dist. Atty. Brent
- Roy D'Arcy as Jess Harvey
- Gwen Lee as Mrs. Myrna Wallace
- Harry Semels as Louie Walsh
- Al Bridge as Al (Owens henchman)
- John Elliott as Martin Kildare
- Gordon De Main as Rancher
- Earl Dwire as Cattleman
