= The Conflict =

1916 film

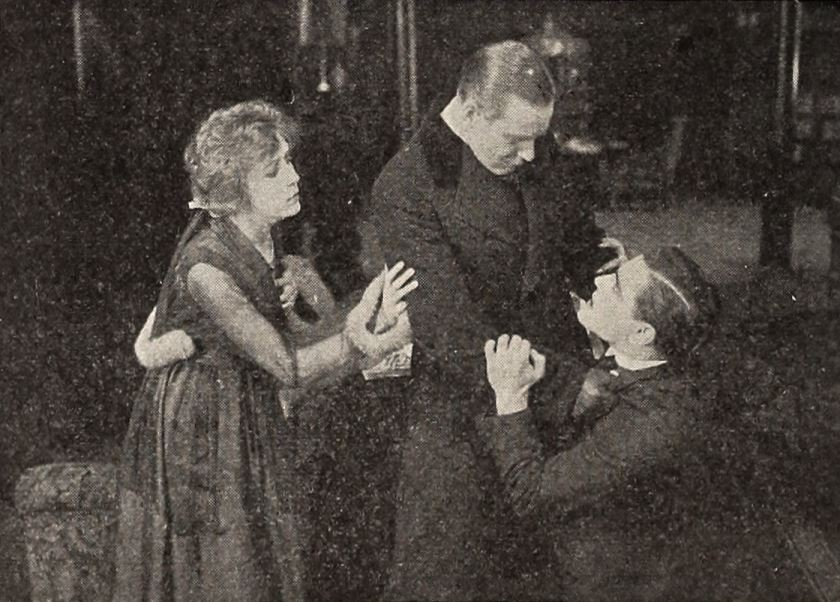
- Directed by: Ralph Ince
- Written by: Edward J. Montagne
- Starring: Lucille Lee Stewart; Huntley Gordon; Wilfred Lytell
- Production company: Vitagraph Company of America
- Distributed by: V-L-S-E
- Release date: July 3, 1916
- Running time: 50 minutes
- Country: United States
- Languages: Silent; English intertitles

The Conflict is a 1916 American silent drama film directed by Ralph Ince and starring Lucille Lee Stewart, Huntley Gordon and Wilfred Lytell.

== Cast ==
- Lucille Lee Stewart as Madeleine Turner
- Jessie Miller as Jeanette Harcourt
- Huntley Gordon as Henry Mortimer
- Wilfred Lytell as Paul Moraunt
- Frank Currier as John Turner
- John S. Robertson as Fred Weyburn
- Richard Turner as Philip Lynch

== Bibliography ==
- Connelly, Robert B. The Silents: Silent Feature Films, 1910-36, Volume 40, Issue 2. December Press, 1998.
