= Daring Love =

1924 silent film

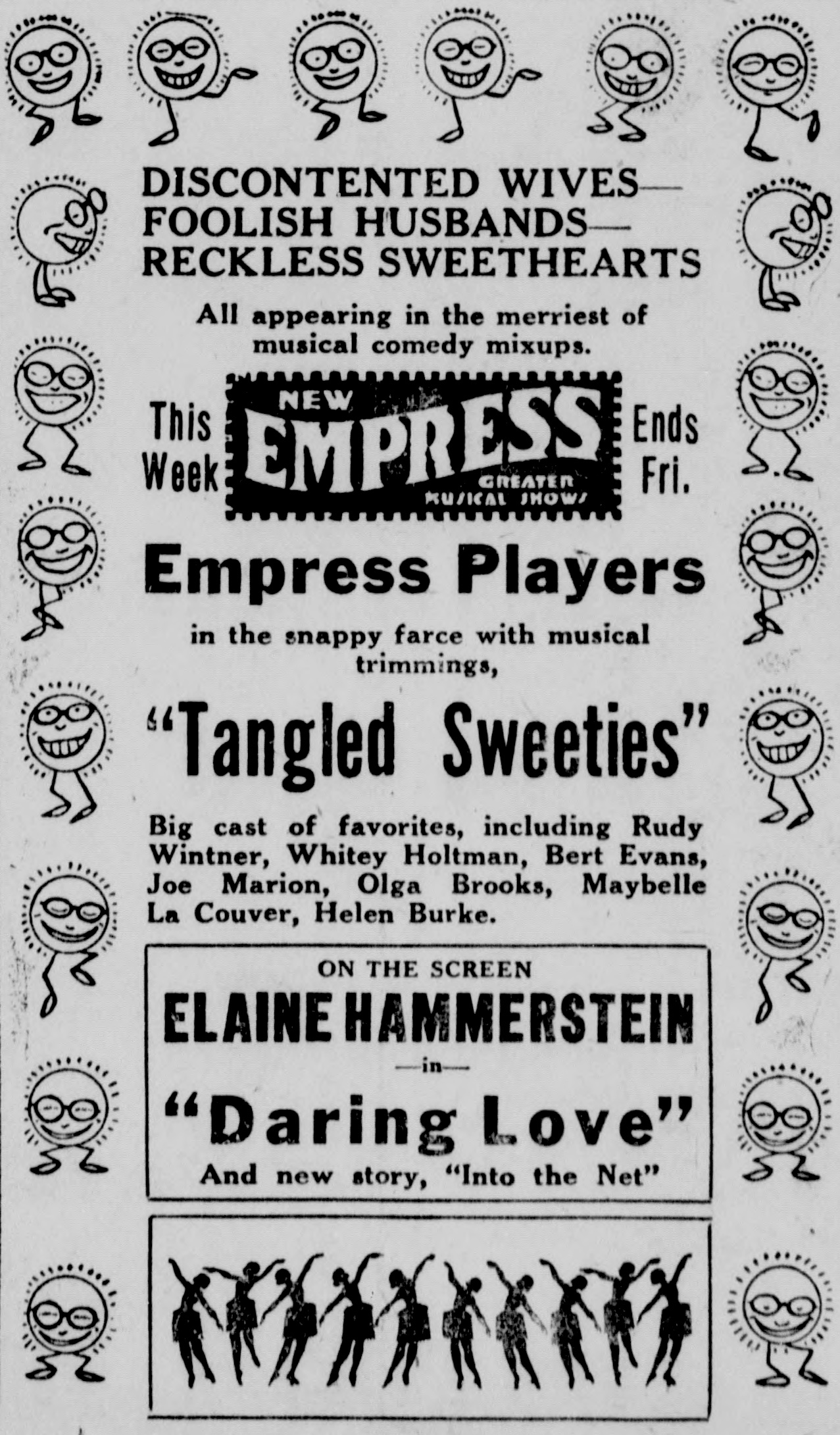
- Contemporary advertisement
- Directed by: Rowland G. Edwards
- Written by: Roland West; Willard Mack; Hope Loring; Louis D. Lighton
- Based on: Driftwood by Albert Payson Terhune
- Produced by: M.H. Hoffman
- Starring: Elaine Hammerstein; Huntley Gordon; Walter Long
- Cinematography: James Diamond; Oliver T. Marsh
- Production company: M.H. Hoffman Productions
- Distributed by: Truart Film Corporation
- Release date: June 15, 1924
- Running time: 60 minutes
- Country: United States
- Languages: Silent; English intertitles

Daring Love is a 1924 American silent drama film directed by Rowland G. Edwards and starring Elaine Hammerstein, Huntley Gordon and Walter Long.

== Cast ==
- Elaine Hammerstein as Bob
- Huntley Gordon as Jaohn Stedman
- Walter Long as Red Bishop
- Gertrude Astor as Music
- Cissy Fitzgerald as Queenie
- Morgan Wallace as Jerry Hayden
- Johnny Arthur

== Bibliography ==
- Munden, Kenneth White. The American Film Institute Catalog of Motion Pictures Produced in the United States, Part 1. University of California Press, 1997.
