= Under Oath (film) =

1922 American silent drama film

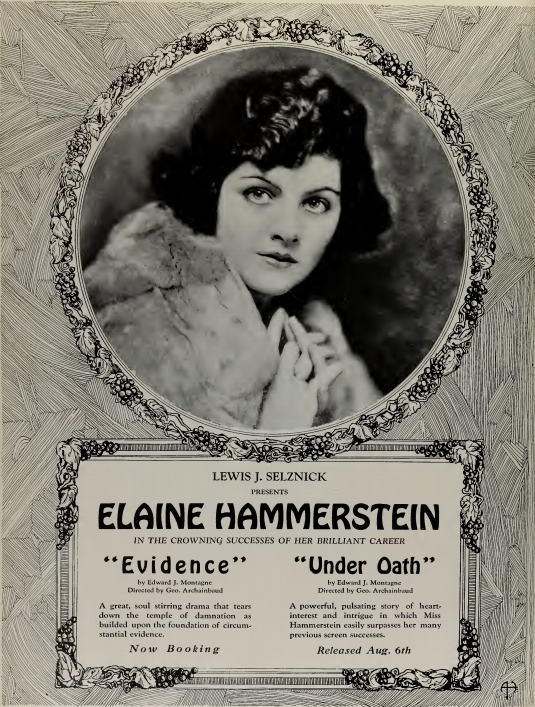
- Directed by: George Archainbaud
- Written by: Edward J. Montagne
- Produced by: Lewis J. Selznick
- Starring: Elaine Hammerstein; Mahlon Hamilton; Niles Welch
- Cinematography: Merritt B. Gerstad
- Production company: Selznick Pictures
- Distributed by: Select Pictures
- Release date: August 6, 1922
- Running time: 50 minutes
- Country: United States
- Languages: Silent; English intertitles

Under Oath is a 1922 American silent drama film directed by George Archainbaud and starring Elaine Hammerstein, Mahlon Hamilton and Niles Welch.

== Cast ==
- Elaine Hammerstein as Shirley Marvin
- Mahlon Hamilton as Jim Powers
- Niles Welch as Hartley Peters
- Carl Gerard as Steve Powers
- T.D. Crittenden as Chester Marvin
- Wallace MacDonald as Ralph Marvin

== Bibliography ==
- Connelly, Robert B. The Silents: Silent Feature Films, 1910-36, Volume 40, Issue 2. December Press, 1998.
- Munden, Kenneth White. The American Film Institute Catalog of Motion Pictures Produced in the United States, Part 1. University of California Press, 1997.
