= Ladies of Leisure (1926 film) =

1926 film by Tom Buckingham

- Directed by: Tom Buckingham
- Written by: Albert Lewin; Dudley Early (intertitles)
- Produced by: Harry Cohn
- Starring: Elaine Hammerstein
- Cinematography: Dewey Wrigley
- Edited by: Charles J. Hunt
- Music by: James C. Bradford
- Distributed by: Columbia Pictures
- Release date: March 1, 1926
- Running time: 57 minutes; 6 reels
- Country: United States
- Language: Silent (English intertitles)

Ladies of Leisure is a 1926 American silent melodrama film produced and distributed by Columbia Pictures. The film was directed by Tom Buckingham and stars Elaine Hammerstein.

This film is not related in story to the 1930 Frank Capra film of the same name. However, prints of both films are held by the Library of Congress.

== Plot ==
Ladies of Leisure (1926)

Socialite Marian Forrest arrives at the residence of Eric Van Norden; a well-known bachelor that she is determined to marry. Van Norden does not feel the same. Even going abroad for the last six months in hopes that Marian would forget him. After noticing his hat on the sofa, Marian goes to Van Norden's bedroom to look for him. Pocketing his spare key before going.

Later on, the Forrests are throwing a huge party at their estate. While Marian waits for Van Norden, her older brother Jack spends time with Marian's live in companion Mamie Taylor. Mamie is startled when she recognizes a saxophone player as Eddie Lannigan, a seasoned conman and her ex-husband. Jack confesses his feelings to Mamie; proposing with his signet ring. She tells Jack that she can only wear the ring as a token of his friendship for now before running away. Eddie follows Mamie to her bedroom, and threatens her into helping steal from the Forrests. Not wanting Jack to know about her past, Mamie secretly leaves.

Using the spare key, Marian enters Van Norden's home before he is able to hide again. She insists they have tea together before Jack can escort her home. Which Van Norden begrudgery agrees. Meanwhile, Jack has hired a private investigator to locate Mamie. It's revealed that Mamie was tricked by Eddie into a fake marriage after her father was framed for a jewel robbery.

After giving most of her money away, Mamie goes to the Brooklyn Bridge to kill herself. Believing it's the only way to escape her situation. Right as she is about to jump though, Van Norden notices her from his car and stops her. The pair don't recognize each other, but Van Norden insists on taking Mamie back to his place.

Mamie and Van Norden eat dinner before she excuses herself to get some sleep. The private investigator phones Jack after seeing the two together. After racing over to Van Norden's, Jack finds his ring on the dining table and assumes the worst. A physical altercation almost occurs when Marian suddenly appears wearing Van Norden's pajamas. She assures her brother that everything is okay as she and Van Norden got married earlier that day. Jack is relieved and congratulates the couple. As the men have a drink, Marian helps Mamie go through the apartment's back door.

Still wondering how his ring ended up at Van Norden's, Marian assures her brother that Mamie will be waiting for him at home. Mamie and Jack reunite before Eddie surprises them with a gun. As Eddie attempts to insult Mamie, Jack punches him in the face. The fighting escalates until Eddie shoots his gun, hitting Mamie.

The film ends with Marian and Van Norden getting legally married at his apartment. Mamie recovers from her injuries and accepts Jack's proposal. Eddie is imprisoned for his many crimes, but is allowed to keep his saxophone.

== Cast ==
- Elaine Hammerstein as Mamie Taylor. This was Hammerstein's last film before retirement.
- T. Roy Barnes as Eric Van Norden
- Robert Ellis as Jack Forrest
- Gertrude Short as Marian Forrest
- Tom Ricketts as Wadleigh
- Jim Mason as Eddie Lanigan
- Joseph W. Girard as Detective

== Preservation and status ==
Complete copies are held at the George Eastman House and the Library of Congress.
