= Broadway Gold =

1923 film directed by Edward Dillon

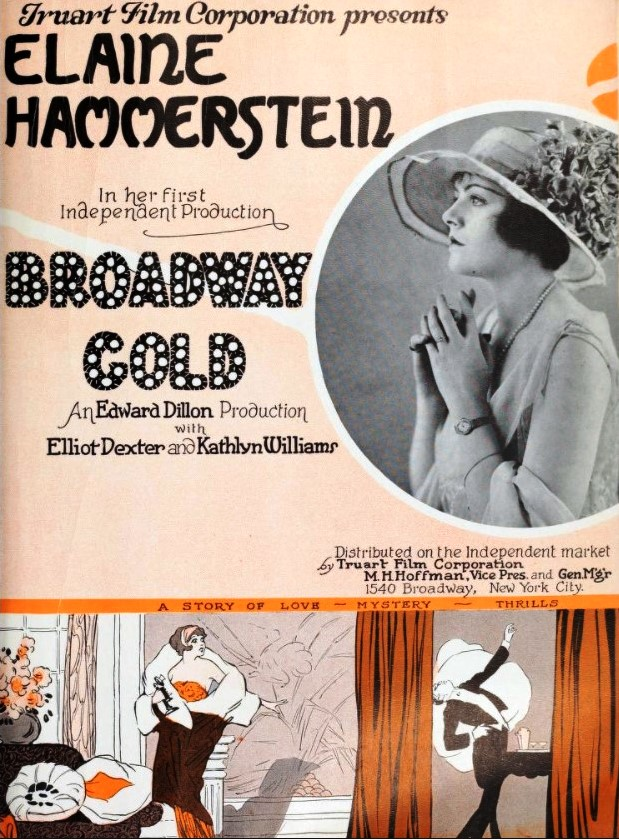
- Trade advertisement
- Directed by: Edward Dillon
- Written by: Kathlyn Harris; W. Carey Wonderly
- Produced by: Edward Dillon; M.H. Hoffman
- Starring: Elaine Hammerstein; Elliott Dexter; Kathlyn Williams
- Cinematography: James Diamond
- Edited by: Charles Wolfe
- Production company: Edward Dillon Productions
- Distributed by: Truart Film Corporation
- Release date: July 29, 1923
- Running time: 70 minutes
- Country: United States
- Language: Silent (English intertitles)

Broadway Gold is a 1923 American silent drama film directed by Edward Dillon and starring Elaine Hammerstein, Elliott Dexter, and Kathlyn Williams.

The film's sets were designed by the art director Cedric Gibbons.

== Cast ==
- Elaine Hammerstein as Sunny Duane
- Elliott Dexter as Eugene Durant
- Kathlyn Williams as Jean Valjean
- Eloise Goodale as Elinor Calhoun
- Richard Wayne as Cornelius Fellowes
- Harold Goodwin as Page Poole
- Henry A. Barrows as Jerome Rogers
- Marshall Neilan as The Driver

== Preservation ==
A print of Broadway Gold has been recently located in a film archive, so it is currently not considered a lost film.

== Bibliography ==
- Darby, William. Masters of Lens and Light: A Checklist of Major Cinematographers and Their Feature Films. Scarecrow Press, 1991.
