= The Country Cousin (1919 film) =

1919 film by Alan Crosland

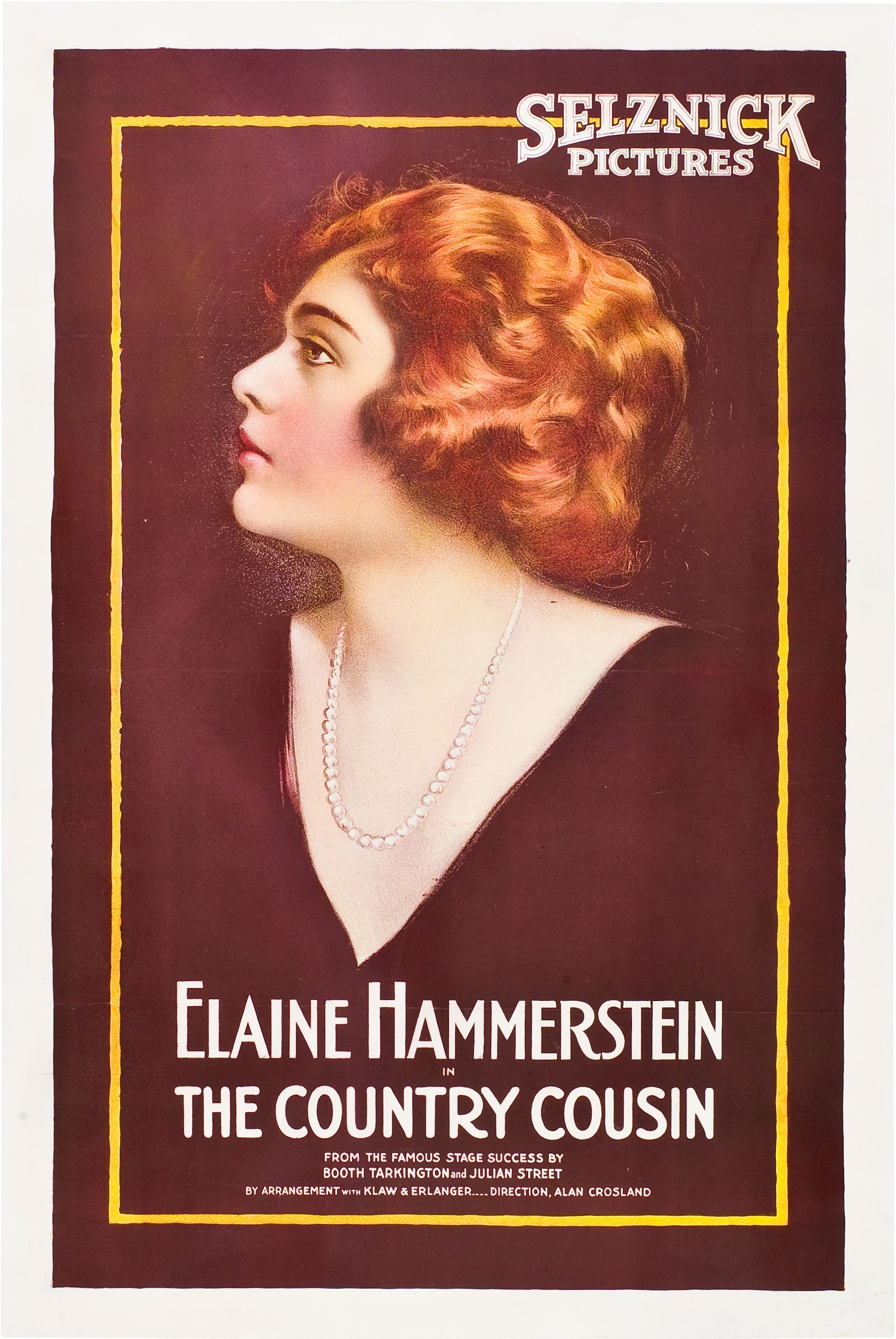
- Directed by: Alan Crosland
- Written by: R. Cecil Smith; Julian Street (play); Booth Tarkington (play)
- Starring: Elaine Hammerstein; Genevieve Tobin; Lumsden Hare
- Cinematography: William F. Wagner
- Production company: Select Pictures
- Distributed by: Select Pictures
- Release date: November 2, 1919
- Running time: 50 minutes
- Country: United States
- Languages: Silent; English intertitles

The Country Cousin is a 1919 American silent drama film directed by Alan Crosland and starring Elaine Hammerstein, Genevieve Tobin and Lumsden Hare.

== Cast ==
- Elaine Hammerstein as Nancy Price
- Margaret Seddon as Mrs. Howitt
- Lumsden Hare as Archie Gore
- Genevieve Tobin as Eleanor Howitt
- Reginald Sheffield as Sammy Wilson
- Walter McGrail as George Tewksbury Reynolds III
- Bigelow Cooper as Mr. Howitt
- Helen Montrose as Maude Howitt
- Gilbert Rooney as Cyril Kinney

== Bibliography ==
- Goble, Alan. The Complete Index to Literary Sources in Film. Walter de Gruyter, 1999.

== External ilnks ==
Media related to The Country Cousin at Wikimedia Commons
