= Parisian Nights =

1925 film

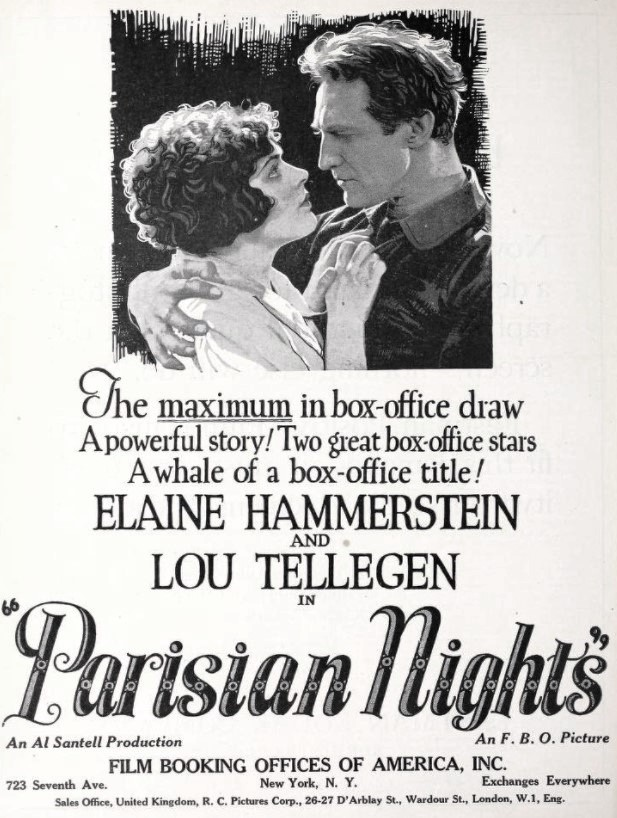
- Advertisement
- Directed by: Alfred Santell
- Written by: Doty Hobart; Fred Myton
- Story by: Emil Forst
- Starring: Elaine Hammerstein; Gaston Glass
- Cinematography: Ernest Haller
- Music by: David Arkenstone
- Production company: Gothic Pictures
- Distributed by: Film Booking Offices of America
- Release date: June 1, 1925
- Running time: 70 minutes
- Country: United States
- Language: Silent (English intertitles)

Parisian Nights is a 1925 American silent drama film directed by Alfred Santell and featuring Boris Karloff.

== Plot ==
As described in a film magazine review, Adela, a wealthy sculptress, finds in Jean, a leader of a Parisian Apaches, the model for which she has been looking when he comes to rob her house. He poses for her and incurs the jealousy of Marie, his underworld sweetheart. A rival faction of the Apaches kills Jacques, Jean’s friend, and a terrific battle between the two factions ensues, in which Marie is killed. Adele finds happiness with Jean, who promises to reform.

== Cast ==
- Elaine Hammerstein as Adele
- Gaston Glass as Jacques
- Lou Tellegen as Jean
- William J. Kelly as Fontane
- Boris Karloff as Pierre
- Renée Adorée as Marie
- E. La Croix Du Duit as The Critic

== Preservation ==
A print of Parisian Nights exists at the Cinematheque Royale de Belgique.

== See also ==
- Boris Karloff performances
