= S.O.S. Perils of the Sea =

1925 film

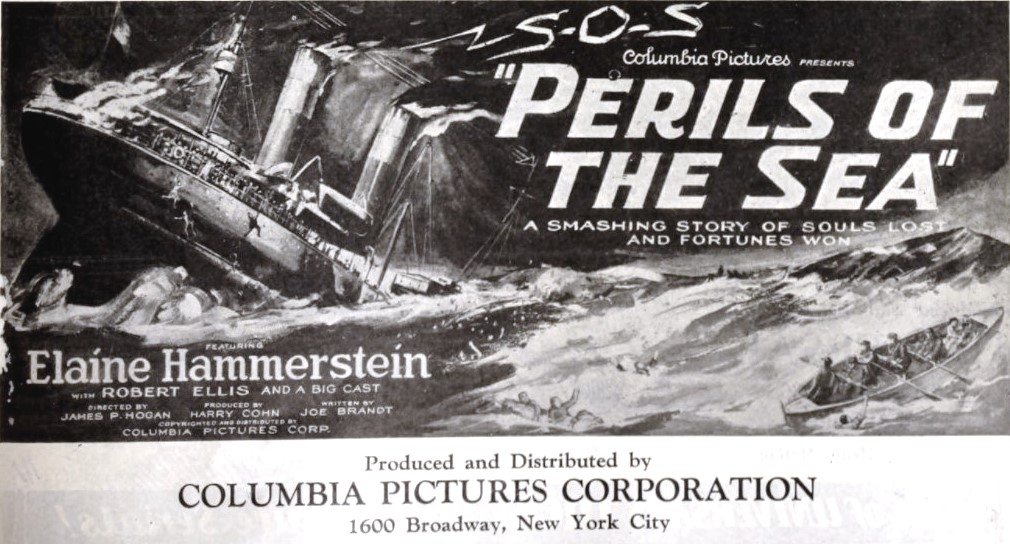
- Advertisement
- Directed by: James P. Hogan
- Written by: Tom J. Hopkins
- Starring: Elaine Hammerstein
- Cinematography: George Meehan
- Distributed by: Columbia Pictures
- Release date: November 1, 1925
- Running time: 6 reels
- Country: United States
- Language: Silent (English intertitles)

S.O.S. Perils of the Sea is a 1925 American silent action drama film featuring Elaine Hammerstein, directed by James P. Hogan, and released through Columbia Pictures.

== Plot ==
As described in a film magazine review, Rose is a girl who is saved from a torpedoed liner and adopted by two young fishermen, brothers Ralph and Jim, both of whom fall in love with her when she grows older. The young woman is an heiress but does not know it. One of the brothers is aware that a large sum has been willed to the woman and he resolves that she shall be his wife. Later, the three members of the love triangle are trapped on a burning steamer. The brother who wishes to obtain the money is drowned, but the other brother and Rose escape and are wed.

== Cast ==
- Elaine Hammerstein as Madame La Coeur/Rose La Coeur
- Robert Ellis as Ralph Seldon
- Billy Franey as Pete (credited as William Franey)
- Pat Harmon as Jim Sheldon
- Jean O'Rourke as Rose, as a child
- Frank Alexander as Cook
- J. C. Fowler as Andrew Carson

== Production ==
The film is shot in black-and-white film, but includes a hand-colored shipwreck sequence.

== Preservation ==
A print of S.O.S. Perils of the Sea is in the Library of Congress collection.
