= Elaine Hammerstein =

American actress

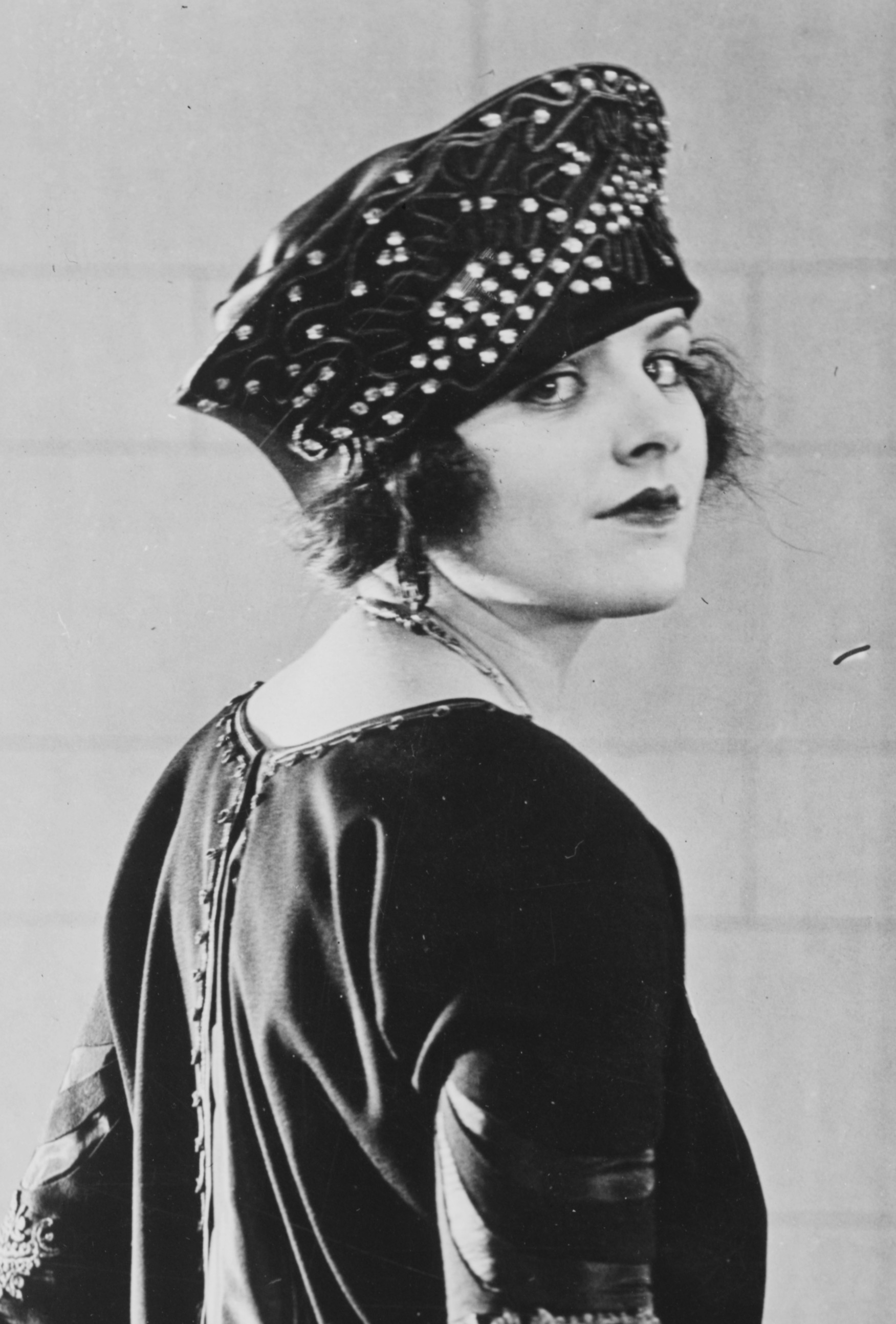
- Hammerstein, 1921
- Born: June 16, 1894; New York City, U.S.
- Died: August 13, 1948 (aged 54); Tijuana, Mexico
- Years active: 1913–1926
- Spouse: James Walter Kays (m. 1926)
- Father: Arthur Hammerstein
- Relatives: Oscar Hammerstein I (grandfather); Willie Hammerstein (uncle); Stella Hammerstein (aunt); Oscar Hammerstein II (cousin); Dorothy Dalton (stepmother)

Signature
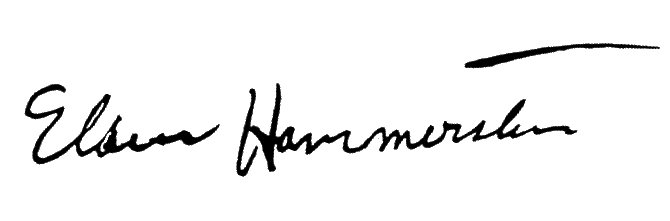

Elaine Hammerstein (June 16, 1894 – August 13, 1948) was an American silent film and stage actress.

== Early life ==
Elaine Hammerstein was born on June 16, 1894, in Manhattan, the daughter of Jean Allison Hammerstein and opera producer Arthur Hammerstein. She was the granddaughter of Oscar Hammerstein I, the niece of William Hammerstein, and the cousin of Oscar Hammerstein II. She was of German-Jewish descent on her patrilineal side. She later became the stepdaughter of fellow actress Dorothy Dalton when her father married Dalton in 1924. Elaine Hammerstein was one year younger than Dalton.

Her father once remarked he was more interested in his daughter's career than in his own. When Hammerstein's parents divorced, Jean Allison did not ask for permanent custody of Elaine but instead requested that her daughter be allowed to choose for herself when she reached the age of maturity.

== Career ==
She appeared in her first Broadway production in 1913, at the age of 17. This was a musical entitled High Jinks, which featured actor Snitz Edwards. After school she was given a position in production work by her father. In 1915 she performed on Broadway a second time, in The Trap. In the drama she acted opposite actor Holbrook Blinn.

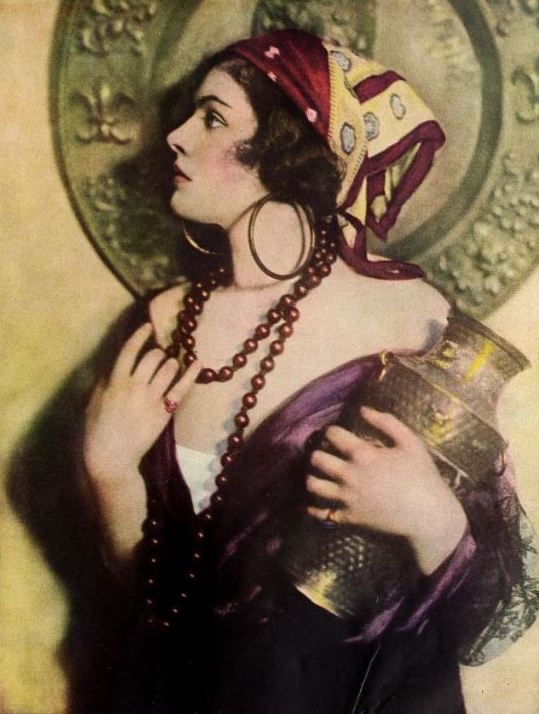
Hammerstein in Shadowland magazine (September 1919)

From this work Hammerstein went into motion pictures. She appeared in 44 movies from 1915 until 1926. Among her film credits are The Girl From Nowhere (1921), The Drums of Jeopardy (1923), Reckless Youth (1922), Broadway Gold (1923), and The Midnight Express (1924), opposite William Haines. With the latter film, the studio tried to promote Hammerstein and Haines as a couple, however, in real life, Haines was a gay man.

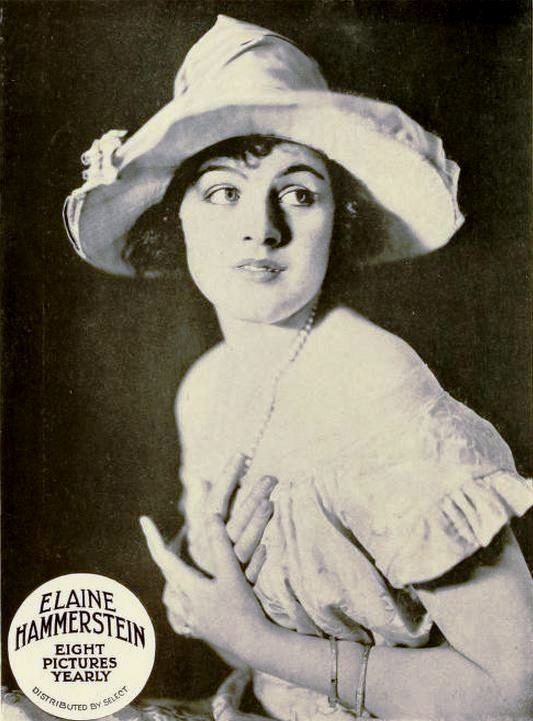
Elaine Hammerstein - Jan 1919

== Marriage and retirement ==
Hammerstein wed James Walter Kays in Los Angeles, California, on June 10, 1926. Kays was a Los Angeles fire commissioner and had been finance director for the California Democratic Party.

Upon her marriage, Hammerstein retired from acting. Her last film appearance is in the Columbia Pictures drama Ladies of Leisure (1926).

== Death ==
In August 1948, while returning from a trip to the Mexican border town of Tijuana, the Kays and three friends were traveling at high speed up a curving hillside road when they struck an oncoming car. The six occupants of the Mexican vehicle all survived with minor injuries, but Hammerstein and her companions were trapped when their car skidded off the embankment and tumbled down the hill. Hammerstein, Kays and their three passengers – Los Angeles residents Jane Shafer Richards, Gladys Goldie Hall, and Richard Garvey Jr. – were all killed.

At the time of their deaths, Hammerstein was 54 years old and her husband was 66. They are interred at Calvary Cemetery in East Los Angeles.

== Selected filmography ==
More than half of Hammerstein's films are lost. This list identifies films that survive, in whole or in part.

Film poster

- The Face in the Moonlight (1915)
- The Moonstone (World Film Corporation, 1915)
- Beatrice Fairfax (serial, International Film Service, 1916; survives incomplete)
- The Argyle Case (1917; lost)
- The Mad Lover (1917)
- The Co-Respondent (Universal Pictures, 1917; fragment survives)
- The Accidental Honeymoon (Warwick-Rapf, 1918; preserved at Library of Congress)
- Her Man (Pathé, 1918; preserved at UCLA Film and Television Archive)
- The Country Cousin (Selznick Pictures, 1919)
- The Pleasure Seekers (Selznick Pictures, 1920; lost)
- The Woman Game (Selznick Pictures, 1920) (Survives)
- The Point of View (Selznick Pictures, 1920)
- Greater Than Fame (Selznick Pictures, 1920)
- Whispers (1920)
- The Daughter Pays (Selznick Pictures, 1920)
- The Shadow of Rosalie Byrnes (1920)
- Remorseless Love (Selznick Pictures, 1921)
- The Miracle of Manhattan (1921)
- Poor, Dear Margaret Kirby (1921)
- The Girl from Nowhere (1921)
- Handcuffs or Kisses (1921)
- The Way of a Maid (Selznick Pictures, 1921; preserved at Library of Congress)
- One Week of Love (Selznick Pictures, 1922)
- Why Announce Your Marriage? (Selznick Pictures, 1922)
- Reckless Youth (1922)
- Evidence (1922)
- Under Oath (1922)
- Broadway Gold (1923)
- Rupert of Hentzau (1923)
- The Drums of Jeopardy (Truart Pictures, 1923; preserved at Library of Congress)
- The Foolish Virgin (1924)
- Daring Love (1924)
- One Glorious Night (Columbia Pictures, 1924; preserved at Cinémathèque Royale, Bruxelles)
- S.O.S. Perils of the Sea (Columbia Pictures, 1925; preserved at Library of Congress)
- The Unwritten Law (Columbia Pictures, 1925; preserved at Library of Congress)
- Paint and Powder (Chadwick Pictures, 1925; preserved at Library of Congress)
- Parisian Nights (FBO, 1925; fragment survives)
- After Business Hours (Columbia Pictures, 1925)
- The Checkered Flag (Banner Productions, 1926; survives incomplete)
- Ladies of Leisure (1926; preserved at Library of Congress)
