= George Archainbaud =

American director

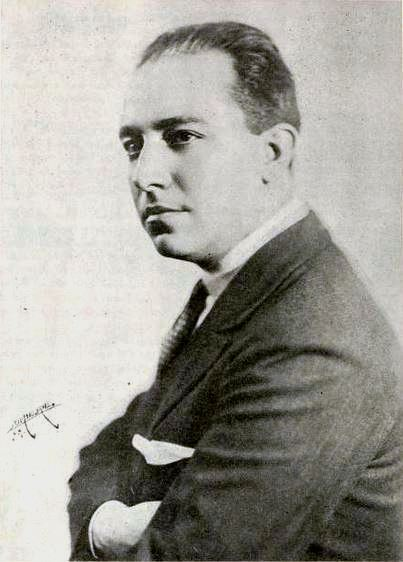
- Archainbaud in 1921
- Born: May 7, 1890; Paris, France
- Died: February 20, 1959 (aged 68); Beverly Hills, California, US
- Occupations: Film and television director
- Spouse: Katherine Johnson (m. 1921)

George Archainbaud (May 7, 1890 – February 20, 1959) was a French-American film and television director.

== Biography ==
In the beginning of his career he worked on stage as an actor and manager. He came to the United States in January 1914, and started his film career as an assistant director to Emile Chautard at the WorlFilm Company in Fort Lee, New Jersey. In 1917 he made his own directorial debut with, As Man Made Her. During the next three and a half decades he directed over one hundred films. After the beginning of the 1950s he moved to television.

While working at RKO Radio Pictures in the beginning of the 1930s, he showed an artistic and skillful eye with many of his films. The finest examples include Thirteen Women (1932), a story of ethnic discrimination and revenge, with Myrna Loy as a half-caste Hindu; The Lost Squadron (1932), a memorable thriller about Hollywood stunt flyers, who risk their lives under the direction of monstrous Erich von Stroheim; Penguin Pool Murder (1932) and Murder on the Blackboard (1934), the first two films of the RKO trilogy starring Edna May Oliver as Miss Hildegarde Withers, a teacher and amateur investigator created by American writer Stuart Palmer; and later in his career the RKO drama Hunt the Man Down (1950), a film noir starring Gig Young which seems more concerned in showing the post-war transformation of seven characters since 1938, than the investigation to solve a murder case.

Although Archainbaud directed films of all genres, he is nowadays mainly linked with westerns. In fact, it was not until the last decade of his directorial career until he specialized in them. With the producer Harry Sherman he made several Hopalong Cassidy oaters. Later he was also one of the principal directors of Gene Autry's Flying A Productions, at which he made several episodes for such weekly television series as Buffalo Bill, Jr., Annie Oakley and The Adventures of Champion.

In 1921 he married actress Katherine Johnston, whose last film was The Flapper (1920). He died in 1959 and is buried at Forest Lawn Memorial Park (Glendale).

== Partial filmography ==
- As Man Made Her (1917)
- A Maid of Belgium (1917)
- The Awakening (1917)
- The Iron Ring (1917)
- Yankee Pluck (1917)
- The Brand of Satan (1917)
- Diamonds and Pearls (1917)
- The Divine Sacrifice (1918)
- The Trap (1918)
- The Love Cheat (1919)
- The Shadow of Rosalie Byrnes (1920)
- The Pleasure Seekers (1920)
- Marooned Hearts (1920)
- In Walked Mary (1920)
- Handcuffs or Kisses (1921)
- Clay Dollars (1921)
- The Girl from Nowhere (1921)
- A Man of Stone (1921)
- One Week of Love (1922)
- Evidence (1922)
- The Power of a Lie (1922)
- Under Oath (1922)
- The Common Law (1923)
- The Shadow of the Desert (1924)
- The Plunderer (1924)
- Single Wives (1924)
- Christine of the Hungry Heart (1924)
- What Fools Men (1925)
- The Silent Lover (1926)
- Puppets (1926)
- Easy Pickings (1927)
- Night Life (1927)
- A Woman Against the World (1928)
- The Tragedy of Youth (1928)
- Ladies of the Night Club (1928)
- The Man in Hobbles (1928)
- George Washington Cohen (1928)
- Bachelor's Paradise (1928)
- The College Coquette (1929)
- The Broadway Hoofer (1929)
- Broadway Scandals (1929)
- Two Men and a Maid (1929)
- Alias French Gertie (1930)
- Framed (1930)
- Shooting Straight (1930)
- The Silver Horde (1930)
- The Lady Refuses (1931)
- Thirteen Women (1932)
- The Lost Squadron (1932)
- The Penguin Pool Murder (1932)
- Men of Chance (1932)
- State's Attorney (1932)
- After Tonight (1933)
- Murder on the Blackboard (1934)
- Hotel Haywire (1937)
- Her Jungle Love (1938)
- Thanks for the Memory (1938)
- Night Work (1939)
- Some Like It Hot (1939)
- Boy Trouble (1939)
- Opened by Mistake (1940)
- The Kansan (1943)
- Girls of the Big House (1945)
- Hunt the Man Down (1950)
- The Old West (1952)
- Last of the Pony Riders (1953)
