= Lewis Sealy =

Irish actor and film exhibitor (1851–1931)

William Armiger Sealy Lewis (1851 – March 19, 1931), known professionally as Lewis Sealy, was an Irish actor and a film exhibitor.

== Career ==
Sealy was a character actor. A native of Ireland, he worked on the London stage for years. He co-wrote and performed in the play A Heathen Goddess at the West London Theatre in 1894.

In the 1890s, he was a film exhibitor, known for the "Royal Cinematoscope", which was the name under which he exhibited Birt Acres' Kineopticon.

He first came to New York in 1908, working as a stage manager and occasional actor as he had in London. His first play in New York was Captain Brassbound's Conversion. He had been a stage director for Lily Langtry and Olga Nethersole.

Having left family in Ireland and England, he apparently returned to work as a stage actor in London, before travelling once more to New York around 1915 to begin a career in film.

His film career included appearances in a number of silent features, in The Witching Hour (1916). A Variety review noted that Sealy "brought a dignity commensurate with the role".

== Death ==
He died on March 19, 1931. He was survived by a daughter and two sons. He was buried at Kensico Cemetery in Valhalla, New York.

== In popular culture ==
Sealy was portrayed by Sean O'Bryan in Chaplin (1992).

== Stage work ==
=== London ===
As a stage manager:

- As You Like It (St James' Theatre; February 24, 1890 – April 30, 1890)
- Esther Sandraz (St James' Theatre; May 3, 1890 – June 7, 1890)
- Your Wife (St James' Theatre; June 26, 1890 – July 7, 1890)
- Miss Hoyden's Husband (Shaftesbury Theatre; July 4, 1890)

As an actor:

- A Heathen Goddess (also co-writer; West London Theatre; October 12, 1894)
- The Man in the Iron Mask (The Adelphi, March 11, 1899 – May 20, 1899) as Officer
- The Chetwynd Affair (Royalty Theatre; August 29, 1904 – September 24, 1904)
- The Merchant of Venice (Terry's Theatre; March 9, 1905 – March 11, 1905)
- Fanny's First Play (Little Theatre April April 19, 1911 – December 29, 1911; Kingsway Theatre December 30, 1911 December 20, 1912) as Cecil Savoyard
- John Bull's Other Island (Kingsway Theatre, December 26, 1912 – March 1, 1913) as Corney Doyle

=== Broadway ===
- Margaret Schiller (January 31, 1916 – Closing date unknown)
- The Fountain of Youth (April 1, 1918 – April 1918)
- A Marriage of Convenience (May 1, 1918 – June 1918)
- King Richard III (March 6, 1920 – March 1920) as Lord Hastings
- The Awful Truth (September 18, 1922 – January 20, 1923) as Jayson
- Merry Wives of Gotham (January 16, 1924 – April 1924) as Pomeroy
- Lass O'Laughter (January 8, 1925 – February 1925) as Richards
- The Merchant of Venice (January 16, 1928 – March 1928) as Balthasar
- Dishonored Lady (February 4, 1930 – May 1930) as Sims

== Filmography ==
- Barbara Frietchie (1915) as Judge Frietchie
- The Unborn (1916) as Mr. Worthy
- The Witching Hour (1916) as Justice George Prentice
- The Primitive Call (1917) as John Malcolm
- Draft 258 (1917) (credited as Lewis Sealey)
- His House in Order (1920)
- The Fatal Hour (1920) as Felix (credited as Louis Sealey)
- A Virgin Paradise (1921) as Peter Latham (credited as Lewis Seeley)
