= Zena Keefe =

American actress

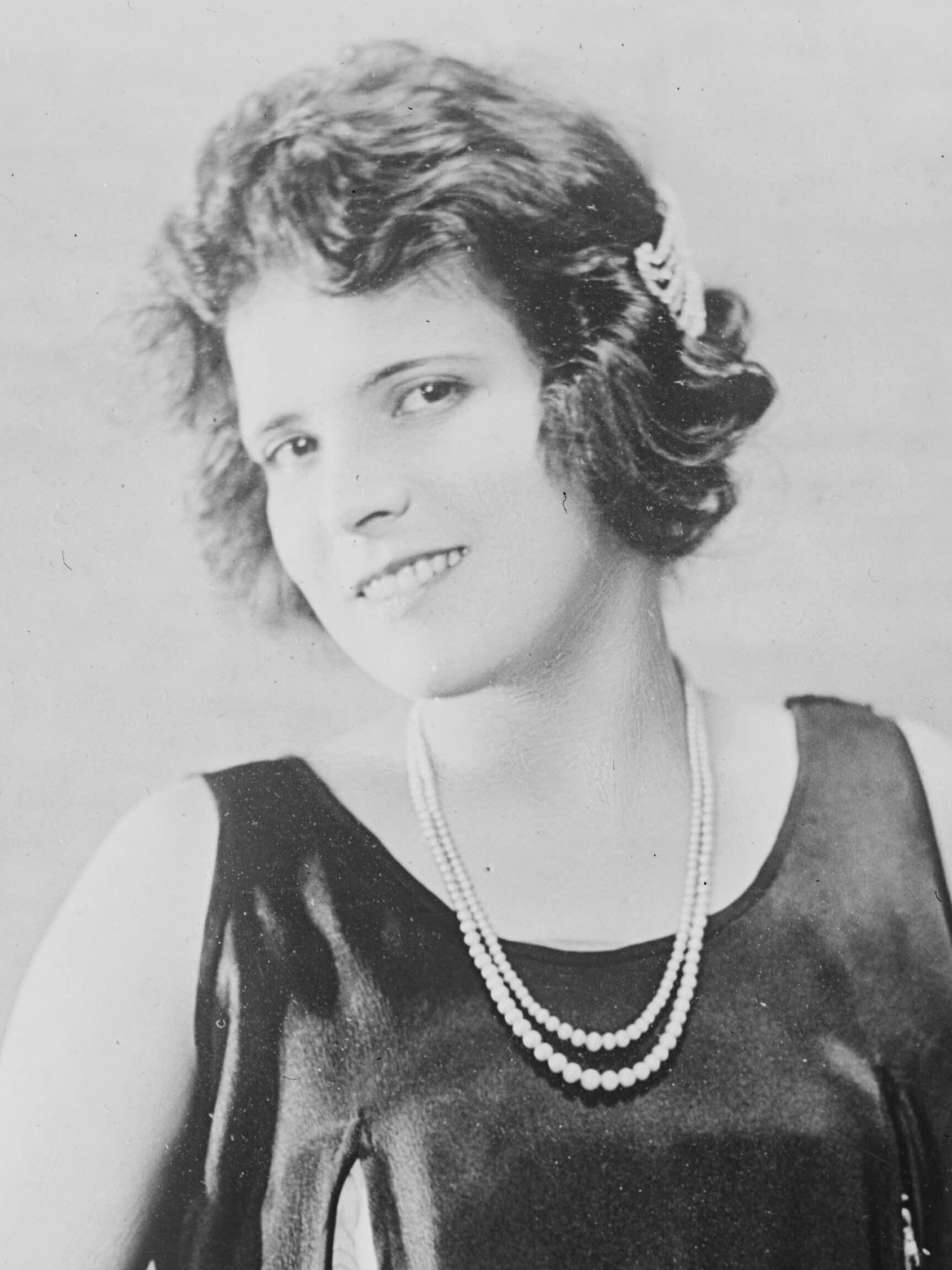
- Keefe, 1920s
- Born: June 26, 1896; San Francisco, California, U.S.
- Died: November 17, 1977 (aged 81); Danvers, Massachusetts, U.S.

Zena Virginia Keefe (June 26, 1896 – November 16, 1977) was an American actress in silent film, active in the 1910s and 1920s.

== Early years ==
Keefe was born on June 26, 1896, in San Francisco, California. Her parents were James P. Keefe and Allie Turbiville Keefe. When Keefe was three years old, she appeared in a production of Brownies in Fairyland. She was educated at a convent in San Francisco until she and her parents moved to New York.

== Career ==
For three seasons, Keefe portrayed Little Mother in a touring production of The Fatal Wedding. She left the theater to appear in films with Vitagraph, but after less than a year with that company she began performing as a featured attraction in Keith Vaudeville. Late in 1914, she went back to Vitagraph.

Keefe's film debut in short films occurred in 1911. By 1916, she was playing a substantial role in films including Her Maternal Right, and leading roles in films like Enlighten Thy Daughter (1917). She continued to appear in at least a few movies every year, until her final appearance in Trouping with Ellen in 1924.

Keefe's work in films included the serial The Perils of Girl Reporters. Studios for which she worked included Selznick Pictures.

== Personal life and death ==
Keefe married William M. Brownell.

Keefe died on November 16, 1977, in Danvers, Massachusetts.

== Selected filmography ==
- Mills of the Gods (1912) as Maria, Giulia's sister
- Her Choice (1912) as Edith, the poor niece
- The Hero of Submarine D-2 (1916) as Ethel McMasters
- Her Maternal Right (1916) as Mary Winslow
- La Bohème (1916) as Musette
- Caprice of the Mountains (1916)
- Little Miss Happiness (1916) as Sadie Allen
- The Rail Rider (1916) as Mildred Barker
- Perils of Our Girl Reporters (1916)
- Enlighten Thy Daughter (1917) as Lillian Stevens
- The Challenge Accepted (1918)
- An Amateur Widow (1919)
- Piccadilly Jim (1919) as Ann Chester
- The Woman God Sent (1920)
- His Wife's Money (1920)
- Out of the Snows (1920)
- Red Foam (1920)
- Marooned Hearts (1920) as Marion Ainsworth
- Proxies (1921) as Clare Conway
- After Midnight (1921) as Mrs. Phillips
- The Broken Silence (1922)
- The Broken Violin (1923) as Governess
- None So Blind (1923)
- Trouping with Ellen (1924) as Mabel Llewellyn
- Who's Cheating? (1924) as Myrtle Meers
- Another Man's Wife (1924) as Dancer
