= Destiny (1919 film) =

1919 silent film directed by Rollin S.Sturgeon

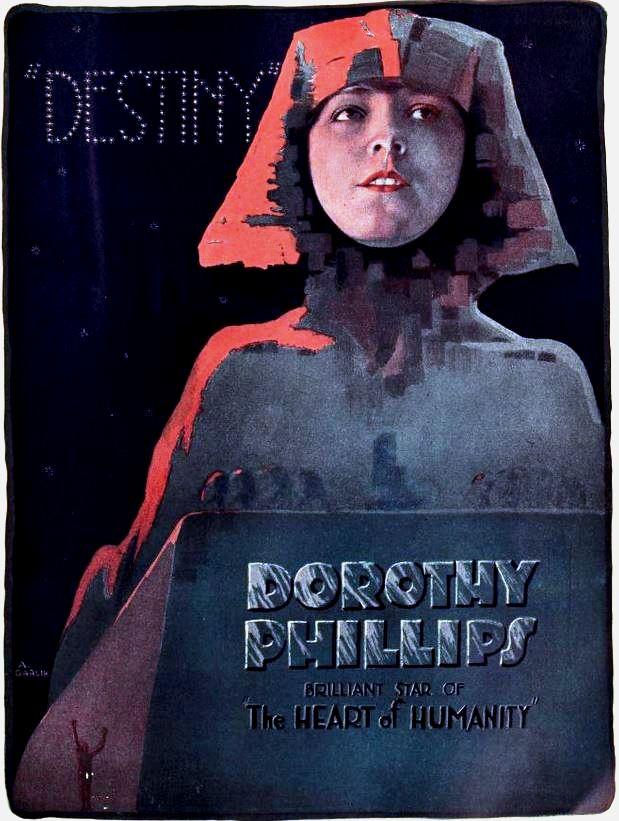
- An advertisement for the film from Motion Picture World
- Directed by: Rollin S. Sturgeon
- Based on: Destiny by Charles Neville Buck
- Starring: Dorothy Phillips
- Production company: Jewel Productions of the Universal Film Manufacturing Company
- Release date: June 1, 1919
- Running time: 6 reels
- Country: United States
- Language: Silent (English intertitles)

Destiny is a 1919 American silent drama film based on Charles Neville Buck's 1916 novel of the same name. The film was directed by Rollin S. Sturgeon and starred Dorothy Phillips. The film was produced and released by the Jewel Productions brand of the Universal Film Manufacturing Company. The scenario of the film was by Elliott J. Clawson.

The film has an entry in the Library of Congress, along with being listed as a lost film. The six reel film adaptation was described as a rural and society drama.

Kinematograph Weekly wrote that "The fairy-book idea is certainly very intriguing, and has enabled the scenario writer to achieve a much-desired happy ending."

A Destiny song was released in 1919 with lyrics by Alfred Bryan and music by Herbert Spencer. The rights to the song were acquired by Jerome H. Remick & Co.

Charles Neville Buck's novel was illustrated by R. F. Schabelitz, published by Grosset & Dunlap, and copyrighted by W. J. Watt & Company.

== Cast ==
- Dorothy Phillips
- William Stowell
- Stanhope Wheatcroft
- Harry Hilliard
- Walt Whitman

== Gallery ==
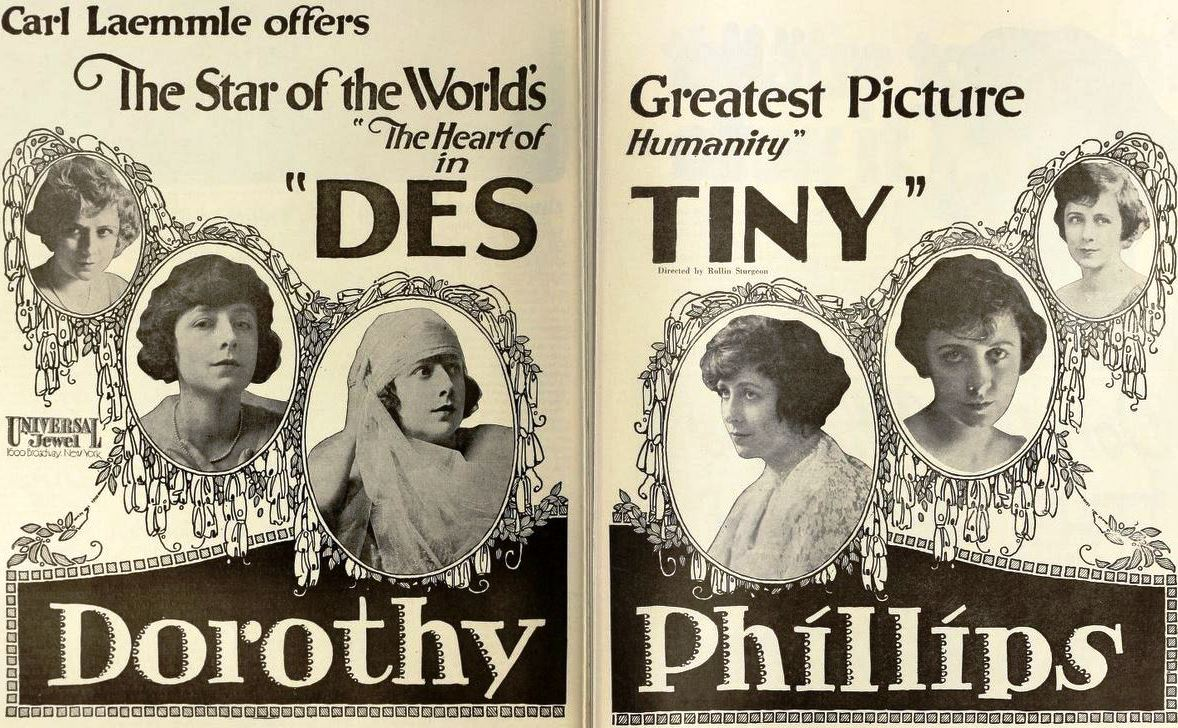
An advertisement for the film from Motion Picture News

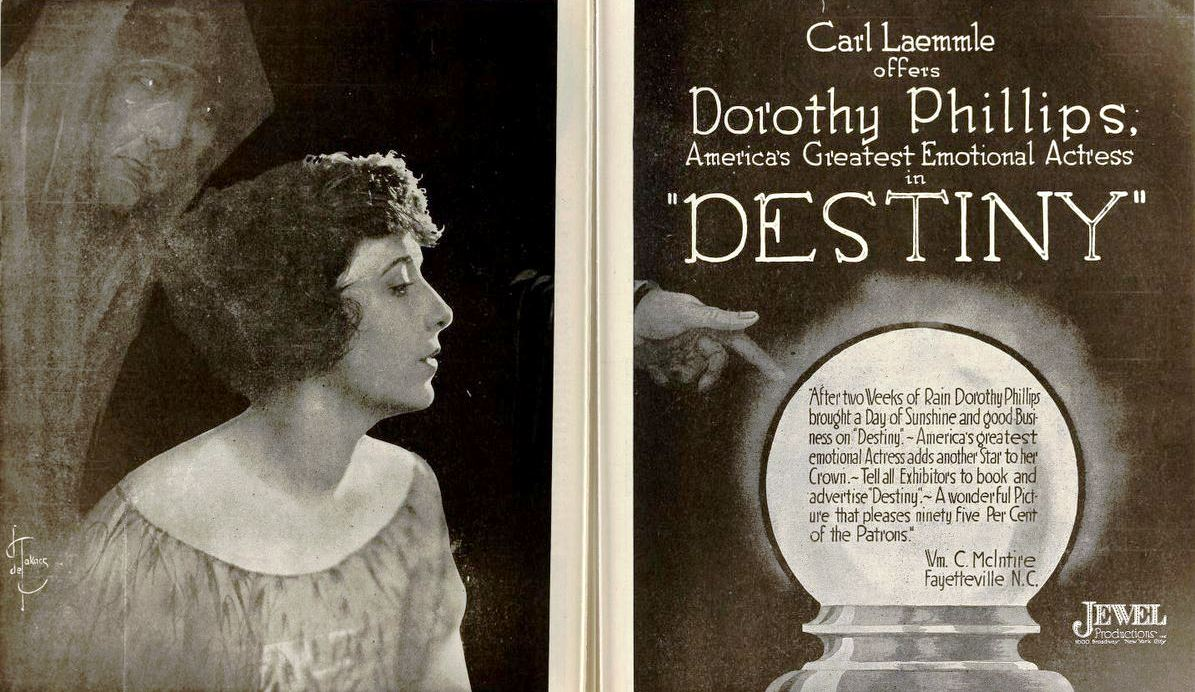
An advertisement for the film from Motion Picture News

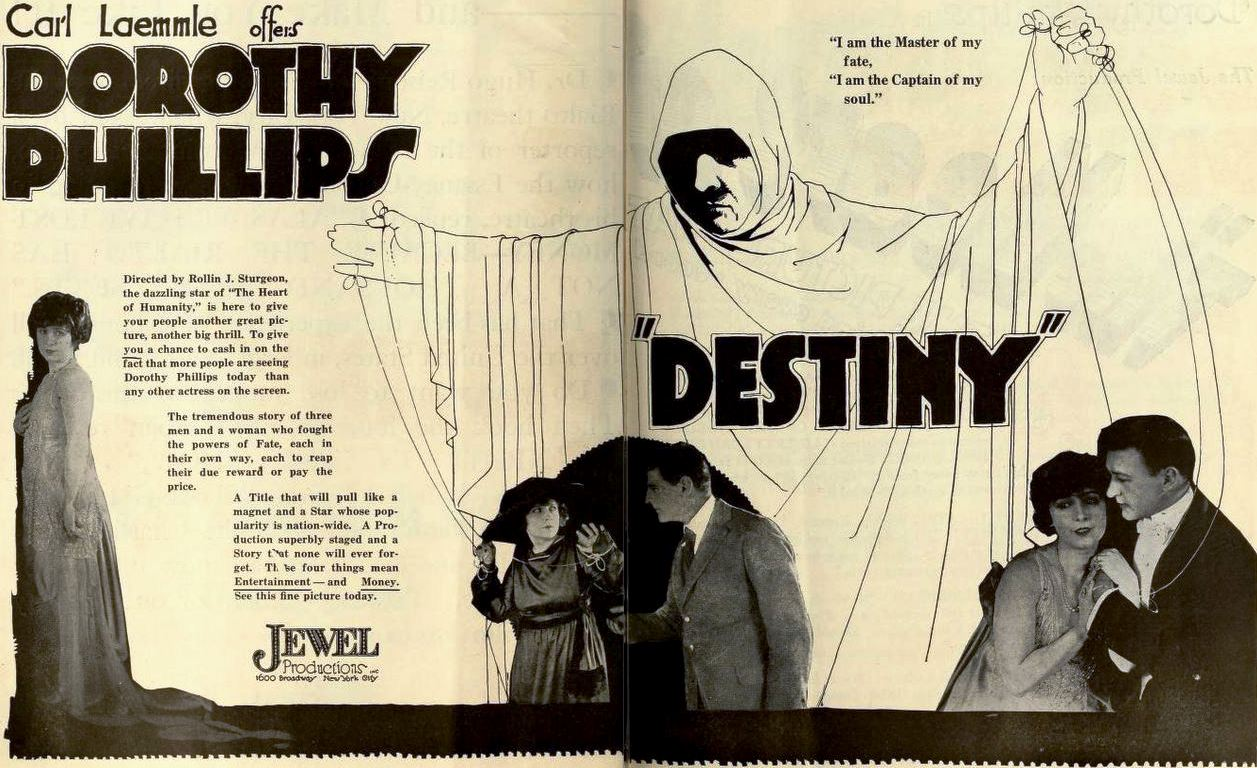
An advertisement for the film from Motion Picture World

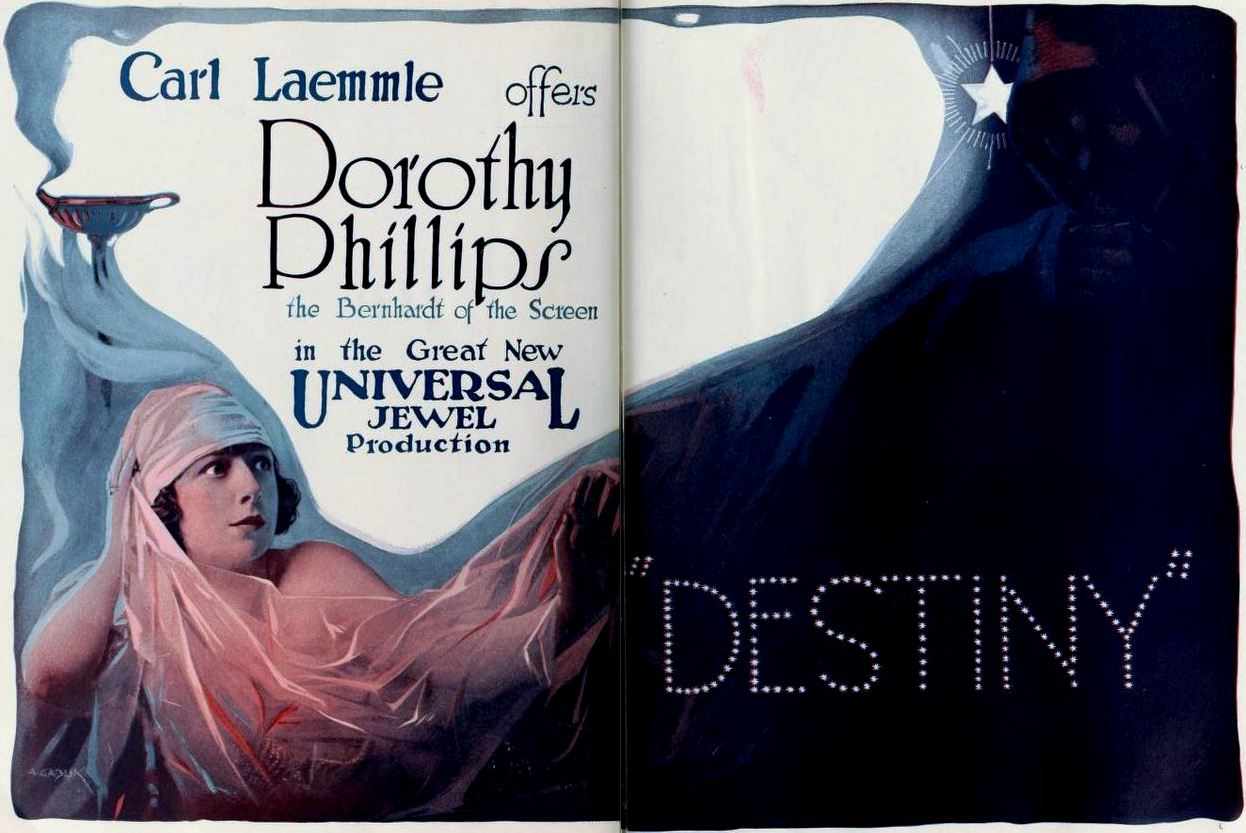
An advertisement for the film from Motion Picture World

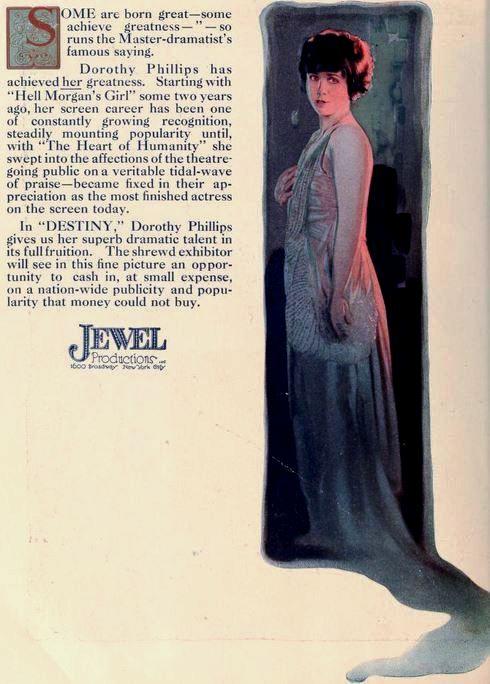
An advertisement for the film from Motion Picture World

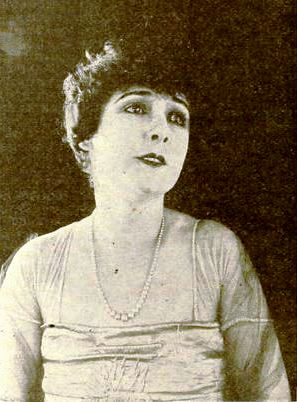
A still of Dorothy Phillips from the film

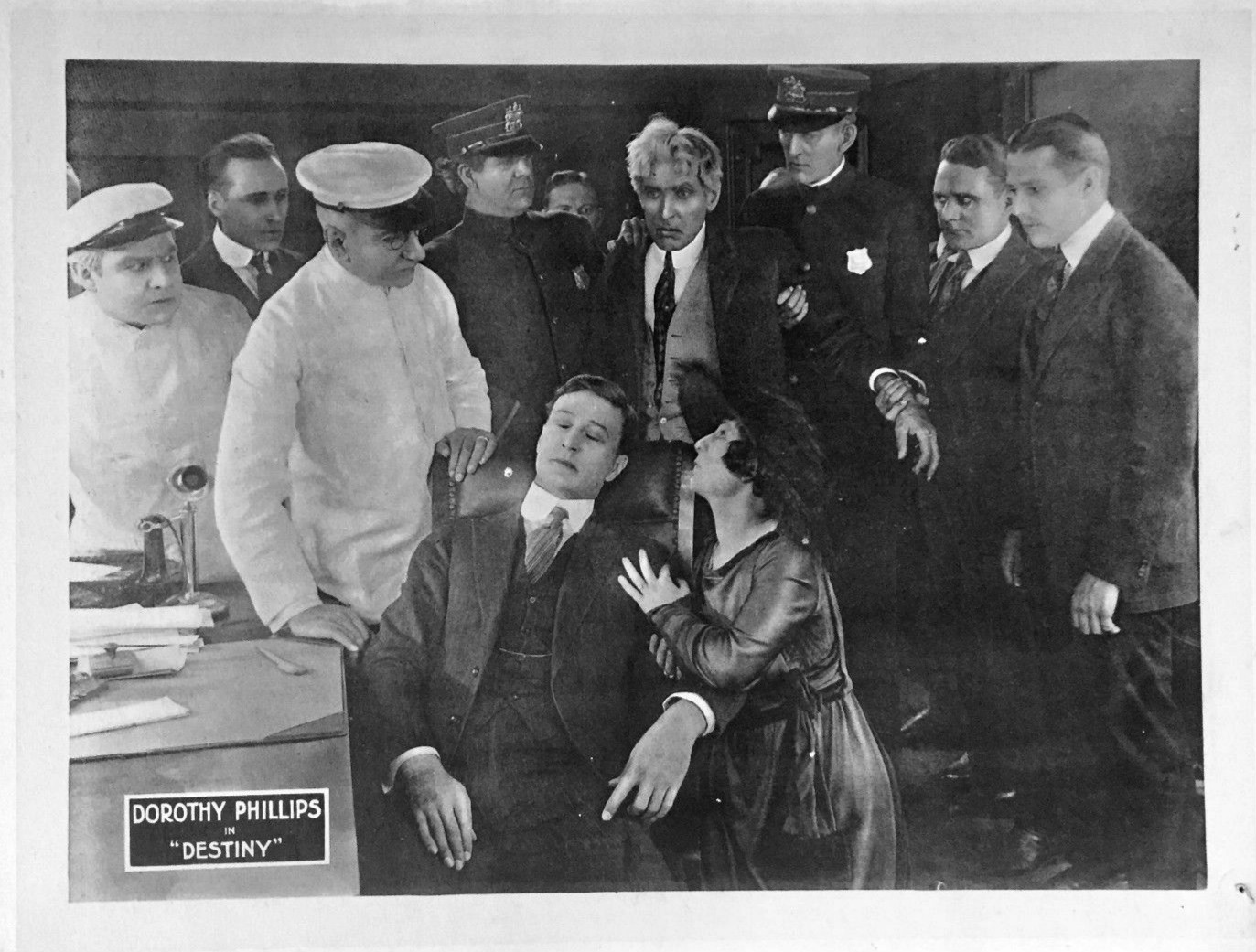
A lobby card for the film

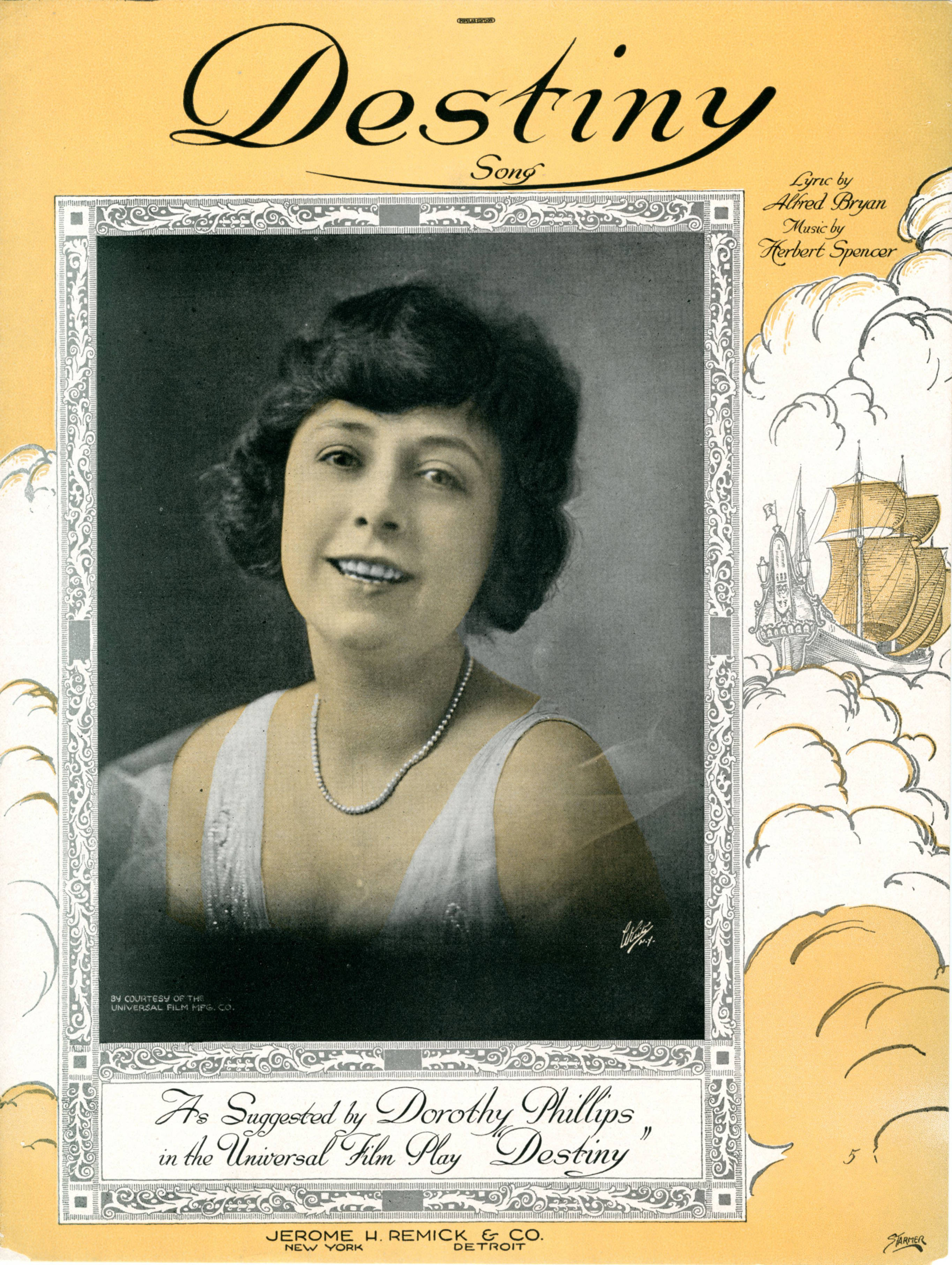
The sheet music cover for the Destiny song
