= Marooned Hearts =

1920 film by George Archainbaud

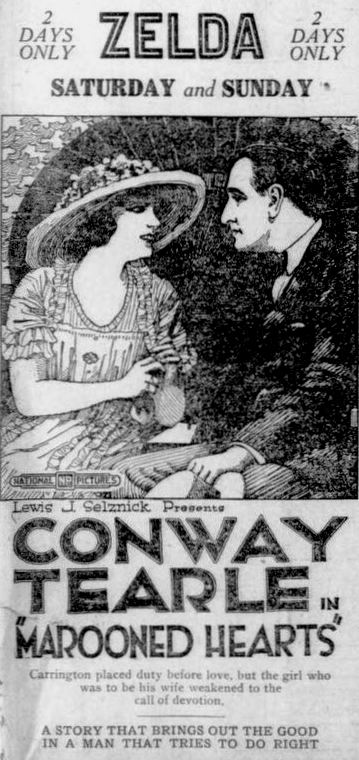
- Newspaper advertisement
- Directed by: George Archainbaud
- Written by: Lewis Allen Browne (story and scenario)
- Produced by: National Picture Theaters Inc.
- Starring: Conway Tearle; Zena Keefe
- Cinematography: Jules Cronjager
- Distributed by: Select Pictures
- Release date: September 15, 1920
- Running time: 5-6 reels
- Country: United States
- Language: Silent (English intertitles)

Marooned Hearts is a lost 1920 American silent drama film directed by George Archainbaud. It starred Conway Tearle and Zena Keefe.

== Plot ==
As described in a film magazine, Dr. Paul Carrington (Tearle), a young surgeon looked to for great things, becomes engaged to Marion Ainsworth (Keefe), a sincere but selfish daughter of wealth. On a day when they set out boating, her failure to deliver a message to her fiancé demanding his immediate return to the hospital brings him to ill favor with his associates. He discovers her deception and, shouldering the disgrace to shield her, goes to a tropical island to conduct his experiments in solitude. A year later she seeks to follow him, but a shipwreck causes her to be cast upon the shore, where he finds her. He divides the island between them and promises to protect her, but orders her not to disturb him and his work. A sailor also cast upon the island attacks her, and Paul comes to her rescue, finally declaring his love for her. With his experiments completed and successful, the three return to civilization and happiness.

== Cast ==
- Conway Tearle as Dr. Paul Carrington
- Zena Keefe as Marion Ainsworth
- Ida Darling as Mrs. Ainsworth
- Tom Blake as Peter Harkins
- Eric Mayne as Cyrus Carter
- George Backus as Dr. Matthews
- Joseph Flanagan as Butler
- Lavilla Siebert as High Diver
