= The Mountain Woman =

1921 film

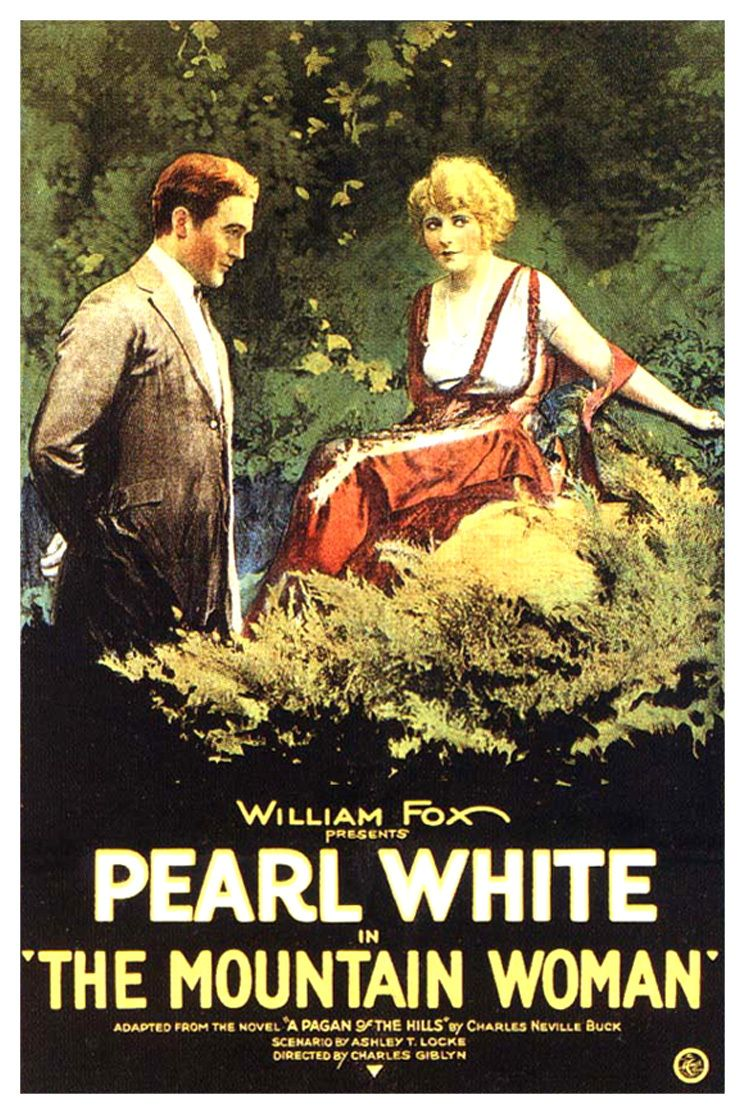
- Theatrical release poster
- Directed by: Charles Giblyn
- Screenplay by: Ashley T. Locke
- Based on: A Pagan of the Hills by Charles Neville Buck
- Starring: Pearl White; Corliss Giles; Richard Travers; George Barnum; Warner Richmond; John Webb Dillion
- Cinematography: Joseph Ruttenberg
- Production company: Fox Film Corporation
- Distributed by: Fox Film Corporation
- Release date: January 23, 1921
- Running time: 60 minutes
- Country: United States
- Language: Silent (English intertitles)

The Mountain Woman is a 1921 American drama film directed by Charles Giblyn and written by Ashley T. Locke. It is based on the 1919 novel A Pagan of the Hills by Charles Neville Buck. The film stars Pearl White, Corliss Giles, Richard Travers, George Barnum, Warner Richmond and John Webb Dillion. The film was released on January 23, 1921, by Fox Film Corporation.

== Cast ==
- Pearl White as Alexander McGiverns
- Corliss Giles as Jerry O'Keefe
- Richard Travers as Jack Halloway
- George Barnum as Aaron McGiverns
- Warner Richmond as Bud Sellers
- John Webb Dillion as Will Brent
- Jack Baston as Jase Mallows
- Charles E. Graham as Lute Brown
