= The Beauty Market =

1919 film directed by Colin Campbell

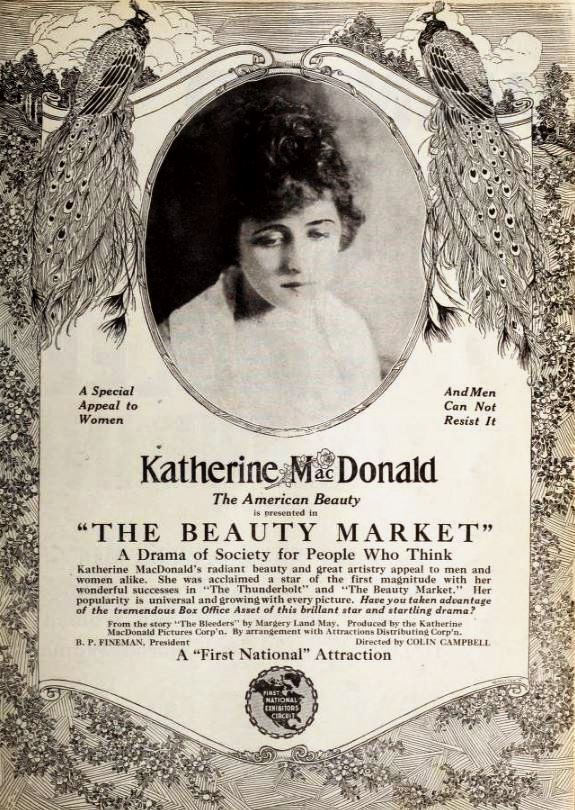
- Advertisement
- Directed by: Colin Campbell
- Based on: The Bleeders by Margery Land May
- Starring: Katherine MacDonald; Roy Stewart; Kathleen Kirkham; Wedgwood Nowell; Winter Hall; Robert Brower
- Production companies: Attractions Distribution Corporation; Katherine MacDonald Pictures
- Distributed by: First National Exhibitors' Circuit
- Release date: December 1, 1919
- Running time: 60 minutes
- Country: United States
- Language: Silent (English intertitles)

The Beauty Market is a 1919 American silent drama film directed by Colin Campbell and written by Margery Land May. The film stars Katherine MacDonald, Roy Stewart, Kathleen Kirkham, Wedgwood Nowell, Winter Hall, and Robert Brower. The film was released on December 1, 1919, by First National Exhibitors' Circuit. There are no known archival holdings of the film, so it is presumably a lost film.

== Plot ==
The film depicts the classic struggle of a woman stuck between the social expectations of a wealthy marriage with status and the desire to marry the man she honestly loves.

== Cast ==
- Katherine MacDonald as Amelie Thorndike
- Roy Stewart as Capt. Kenneth Laird
- Kathleen Kirkham as Christine Appleby
- Wedgwood Nowell as Hobie Flagg
- Winter Hall as Ashburton Gaylord
- Robert Brower as Amelia's Uncle Issacs
