= After Midnight (1921 film) =

1921 silent film

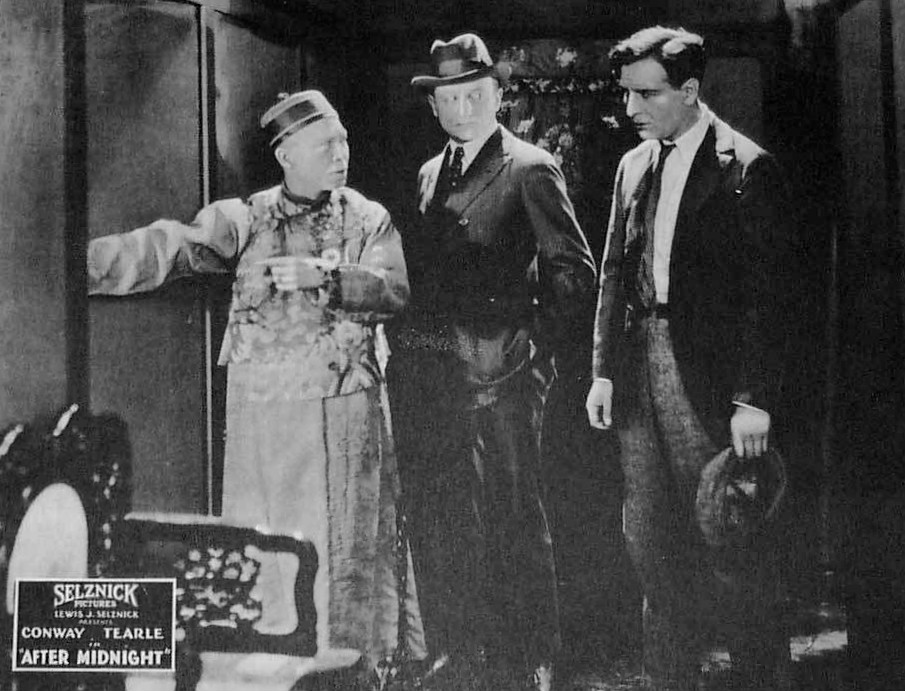
- Directed by: Ralph Ince
- Written by: John Lynch; Edward J. Montagne
- Produced by: Lewis J. Selznick
- Starring: Conway Tearle; Zena Keefe; Warren Black
- Cinematography: Jacob A. Badaracco
- Production company: Selznick Pictures
- Distributed by: Select Pictures
- Release date: 10 September 1921
- Running time: 50 minutes
- Country: United States
- Languages: Silent; English intertitles

After Midnight is a lost 1921 American silent drama film directed by Ralph Ince and starring Conway Tearle, Zena Keefe and Warren Black.

== Cast ==
- Conway Tearle as Gordon Phillips / Wallace Phillips
- Zena Keefe as Mrs. Gordon Phillips
- Warren Black as Mock Sing
- Harry Allen as Harris
- Macey Harlam as Warren Black
- Woo Lang as Toy Sing

== Preservation ==
With no holdings located in archives, After Midnight is considered a lost film.

== Bibliography ==
- Munden, Kenneth White. The American Film Institute Catalog of Motion Pictures Produced in the United States, Part 1. University of California Press, 1997.
