= Gladys Coburn =

American actress (1898–1948)

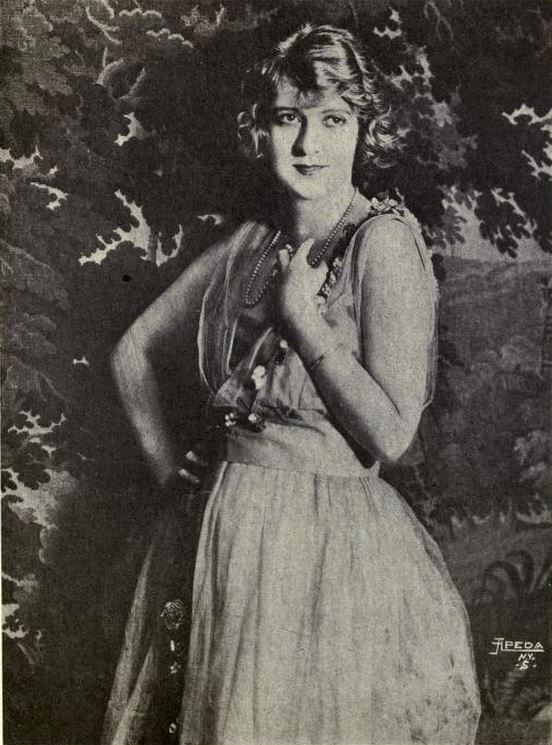
- Coburn in Illinois Central Magazine, 1921
- Died: January 1, 1969

Gladys Coburn was an actor in theater and films. She had starring roles during the silent film era including in the 1917 film The Primitive Call and the 1920 film Heart Strings. She also performed in theatrical productions.

Her appearance was described as being similar to June Caprice.

Gladys was born on August 22, 1893, in Arkansas. She lived most of her life in New Castle, Indiana. She died in January 1969 at the age of 75.

== Filmography ==
- Madame X (1916) as Helene
- The Primitive Call (1917) as Betty Malcolm
- The Firing Line (1919) as Jessie Bradley
- The Fatal Hour as Dorothy Gore
- Voices (1920) as Marion Lord
- Out of the Snows (1920)
- Heart Strings (1920) as Kathleen Noyes
- God's Crucible as Marjorie Menzies
- The Battle of Life
