= Society Snobs =

1921 silent film

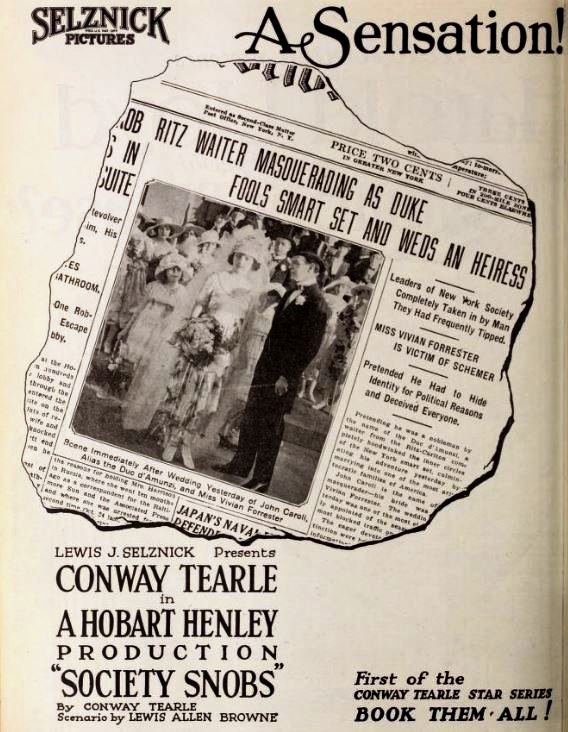
- Directed by: Hobart Henley
- Written by: Conway Tearle; Lewis Allen Browne
- Produced by: Lewis J. Selznick; Hobart Henley
- Starring: Conway Tearle; Martha Mansfield; Ida Darling
- Cinematography: John W. Brown
- Production company: Selznick Pictures
- Distributed by: Select Pictures
- Release date: February 1921
- Running time: 50 minutes
- Country: United States
- Languages: Silent; English intertitles

Society Snobs is a 1921 American silent comedy film directed by Hobart Henley and starring Conway Tearle, Martha Mansfield and Ida Darling.

== Cast ==
- Conway Tearle as Lorenzo Carilo / Duke d'Amunzi
- Martha Mansfield as Vivian Forrester
- Ida Darling as Mrs. Forrester
- Jack McLean as Ned Forrester
- Huntley Gordon as Duane Thornton

== Bibliography ==
- Munden, Kenneth White. The American Film Institute Catalog of Motion Pictures Produced in the United States, Part 1. University of California Press, 1997.
