= By Right of Purchase =

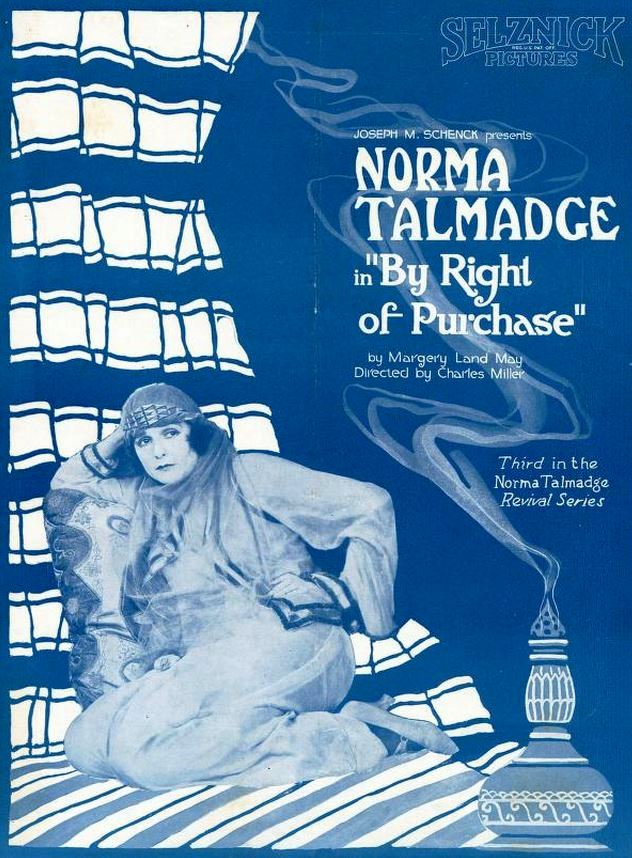
- Advertisement
- Directed by: Charles Miller
- Written by: Harry Hoyt (scenario)
- Story by: Margery Land May
- Produced by: Joseph Schenck
- Starring: Norma Talmadge
- Cinematography: Alfred Huger Moses; Edward Wynard
- Production company: Norma Talmadge Film Corporation
- Distributed by: Select Pictures
- Release date: February 1918
- Running time: 72 mins.
- Country: United States
- Language: Silent (English intertitles)

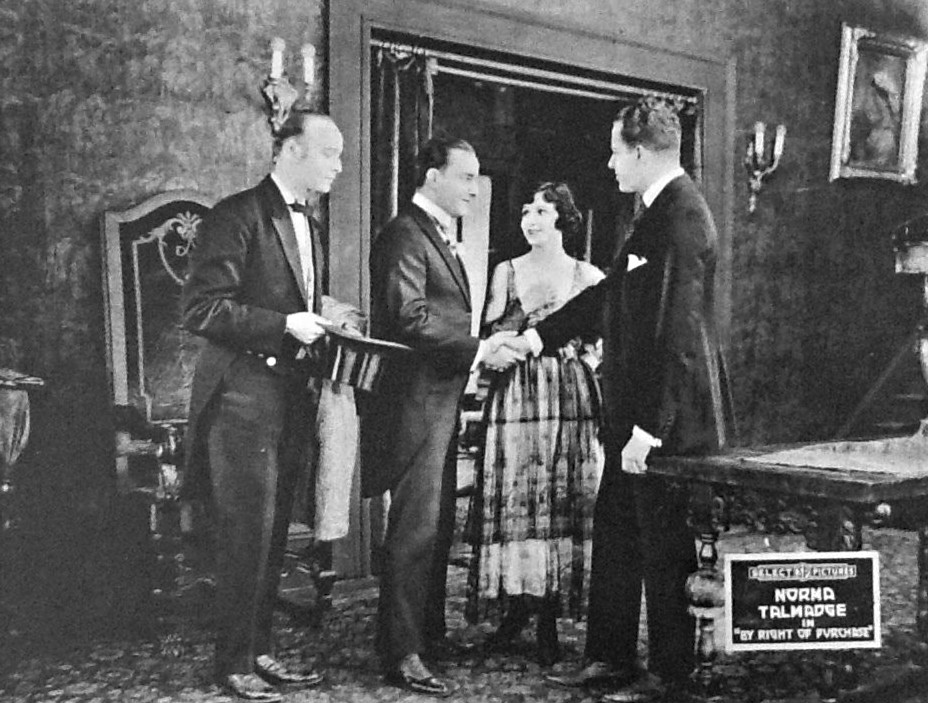
Lobby card

By Right of Purchase is a 1918 American silent drama film starring Norma Talmadge in a story produced by her husband Joseph Schenck. The film was distributed by Lewis J. Selznick's Select Pictures company. An up-and-coming actress and soon to be gossip columnist Hedda Hopper has a small role in this picture.

== Plot ==
As described in a film magazine, against the promptings of her heart, Margot Hughes marries Chadwick Himes and completely ignores the fact that her husband is very much in love with her. As a result, Chadwick comes to believe that it is impossible to win the love of his wife, and becomes cold towards her just as her love for him begins to awaken. There is a decided breach between them and when Margot takes up with Dick Derwent, even though her husband forbids it, they break altogether. Through a friend Chadwick learns that his wife loves him. He goes to their home to beg for her forgiveness only to find it empty. He goes to his yacht for seclusion only to find Margot there, and they have a happy reunion.

== Cast ==
- Norma Talmadge as Margot Hughes
- Eugene O'Brien as Chadwick Himes
- Ida Darling as Mrs. Hughes
- William Courtleigh, Jr. as Dick Derwent
- Charles Wellesley as Donald Nugent
- Florence B. Billings as Madge Sears
- Hedda Hopper as Woman of society, on the phone (uncredited)

== Preservation status ==
The film survives today in the Library of Congress, albeit with some reported deterioration in the sixth and last reel.
