= Destiny's Isle =

1922 film

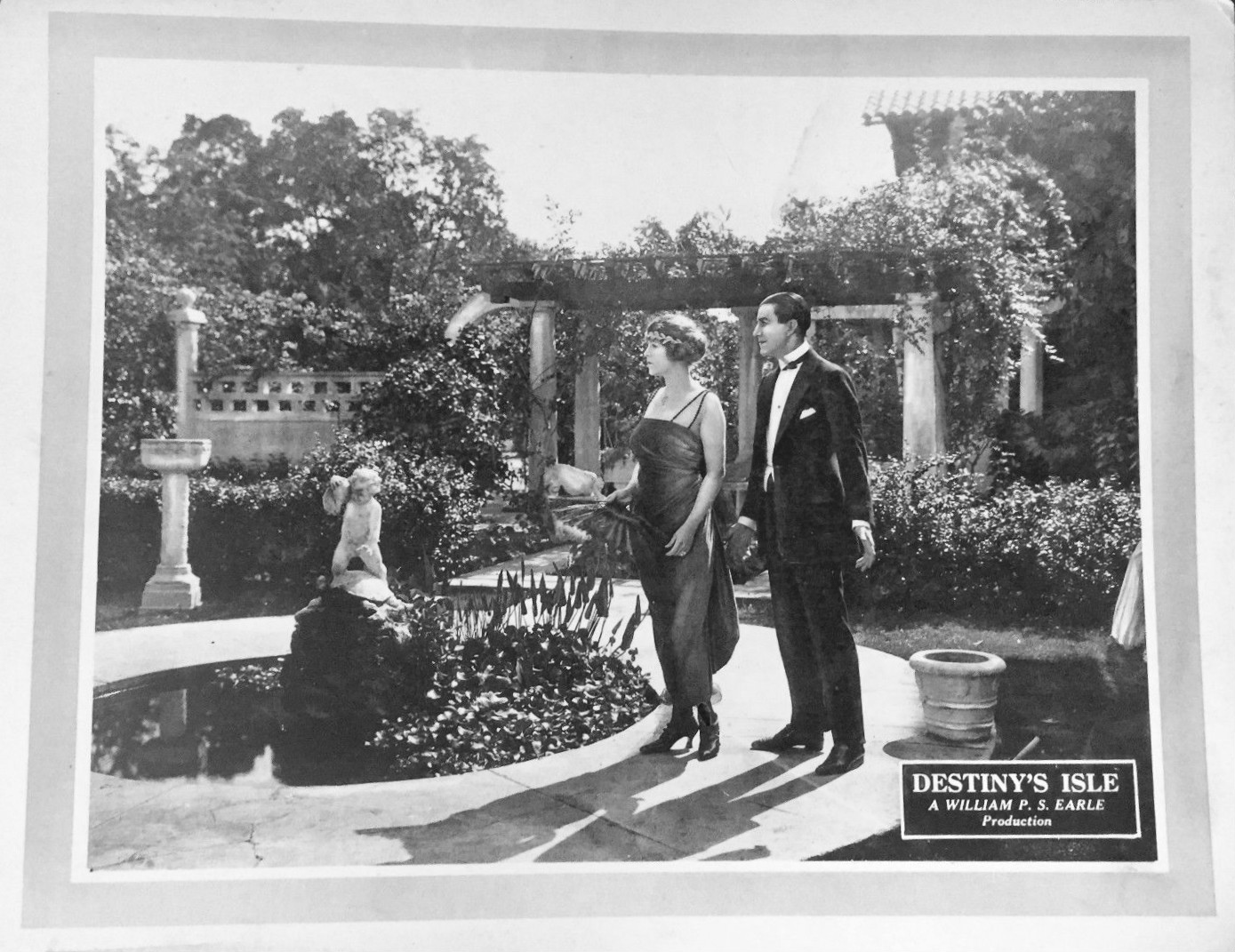
- Directed by: William P.S. Earle
- Written by: Margery Land May
- Produced by: William P.S. Earle
- Starring: Virginia Lee; Ward Crane; Florence Billings
- Cinematography: William S. Adams
- Production company: William P.S. Earle Productions
- Distributed by: American Releasing Corporation
- Release date: April 30, 1922
- Running time: 60 minutes
- Country: United States
- Languages: Silent; English intertitles

Destiny's Isle is a 1922 American silent drama film directed by William P.S. Earle and starring Virginia Lee, Ward Crane and Florence Billings.

== Cast ==
- Virginia Lee as Lola Whitaker
- Ward Crane as Tom Proctor
- Florence Billings as Florence Martin
- Arthur Housman as Arthur Randall
- George Fawcett as Judge Richard Proctor
- William B. Davidson as Lazus
- Mario Majeroni asDr. Whitaker
- Ida Darling as Mrs. Pierpont
- Albert Roccardi as Mrs. Ripp
- Pauline Dempsey as Mammy

== Bibliography ==
- Connelly, Robert B. The Silents: Silent Feature Films, 1910-36, Volume 40, Issue 2. December Press, 1998.
- Munden, Kenneth White. The American Film Institute Catalog of Motion Pictures Produced in the United States, Part 1. University of California Press, 1997.
