= The House of Glass (film) =

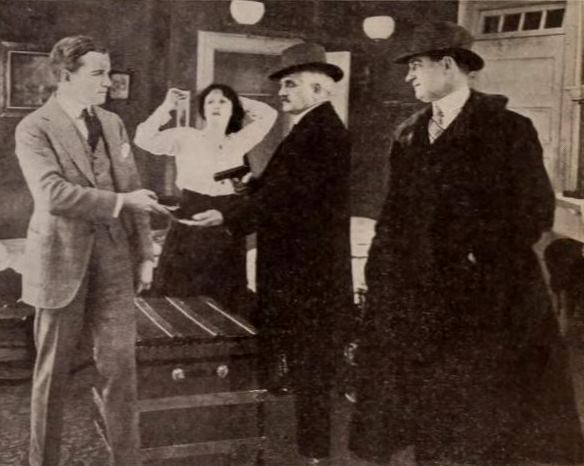
- Directed by: Émile Chautard
- Written by: Max Marcin (play); Charles E. Whittaker
- Starring: Clara Kimball Young; Pell Trenton; Corliss Giles
- Cinematography: Jacques Bizeul
- Production company: Clara Kimball Young Film Corporation
- Distributed by: Select Pictures
- Release date: February 1918
- Running time: 50 minutes
- Country: United States
- Languages: Silent; English intertitles

The House of Glass is a 1918 American silent drama film directed by Émile Chautard and starring Clara Kimball Young, Pell Trenton, and Corliss Giles.

== Cast ==
- Clara Kimball Young as Margaret Case
- Pell Trenton as James Burke
- Corliss Giles as Harvey Lake
- Edward Kimball as Lawyer McClellan
- James Laffey as Director Atwood
- Josie Sadler as Landlady
- Norman Selby as Detective Carroll
- William Waltman as Detective Crowley
- Peggy Burke as Nellie, the Maid
- Doris Field as Edith, the Maid

== Bibliography ==
- Goble, Alan. The Complete Index to Literary Sources in Film. Walter de Gruyter, 1999.
