= Margery Land May =

American writer (1897–1932)

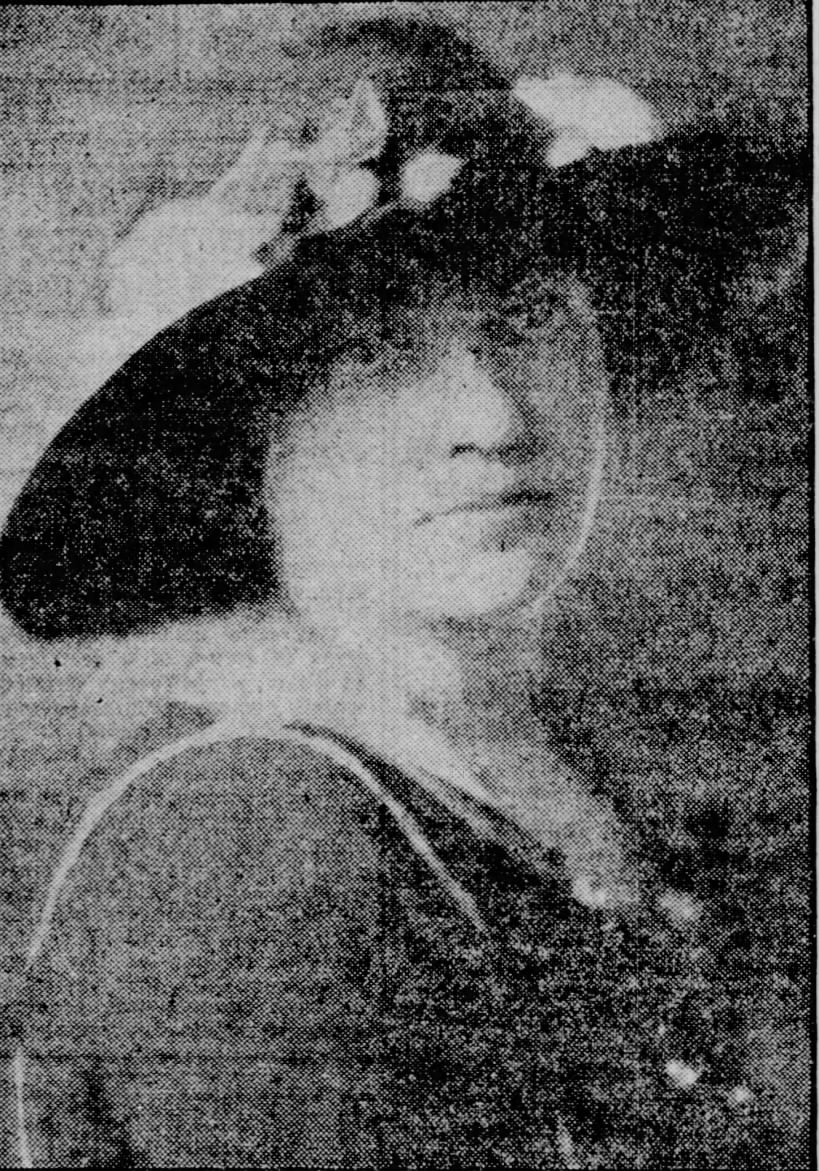
- Born: January 14, 1897; New Orleans
- Died: May 13, 1932; Shreveport
- Resting place: Forest Park East Cemetery
- Mother: Florence Lister Land May

Margery Land May Mason Foster Simonsen (14 January 1897 – 13 May 1932) was an American novelist, short story writer, and screenwriter.

Margery Land May was born on 14 January 1897 in New Orleans. She was the daughter of artist and poet Florence Lister Land May, a member of the prominent Land family and daughter of Alfred Dillingham Land, a justice of the Louisiana Supreme Court. May lived with her mother in California, New York, and finally Shreveport, Louisiana, where she graduated from Shreveport High School. She attended Sophie Newcomb College and Columbia University.

While still a college student, she published her first short story, "Confessions,” in H.L. Mencken’s The Smart Set in December 1915. A number of her works were adapted as films: Those Who Judge (1924), based on her novel Such As Sit in Judgement (1923), The Beauty Market (1919), based on her short story "The Bleeders", and By Right of Purchase (1918), based on her short story of the same title. Her other film credits included Destiny's Isle (1922).

May married three times. She divorced her first husband, attorney Samuel W. Mason. Her second husband, attorney James Martin Foster, died in 1928. She was divorcing her third husband, Stanley Llewellyn Simonsen, at the time of her death. She committed suicide by shooting herself with a .32-caliber revolver in her Shreveport home on 13 May 1932.

== Bibliography ==
- Such As Sit in Judgement (1923)
- To Him That Knocketh (1925)

== Filmography ==
- By Right of Purchase (1918)
- The Beauty Market (1919)
- Destiny's Isle (1922)
- Those Who Judge (1924)
