= In Search of a Sinner =

1920 film

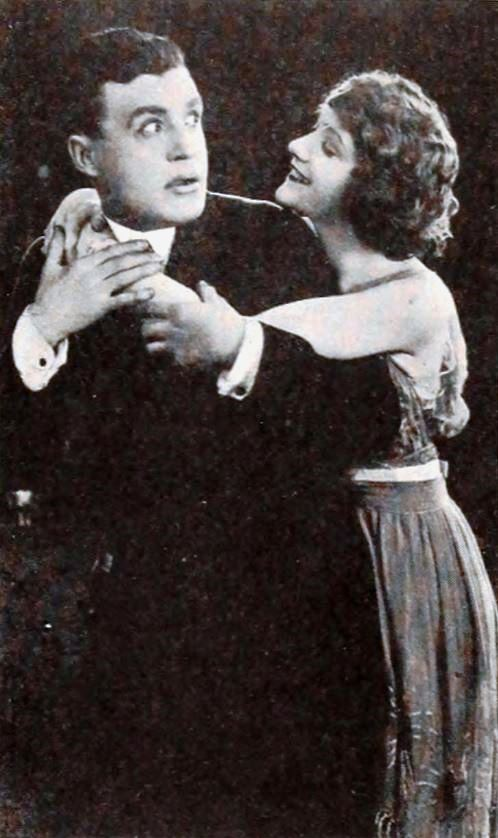
- Still with Rockliffe Fellowes and Constance Talmadge
- Directed by: David Kirkland
- Screenplay by: John Emerson; Anita Loos
- Based on: In Search of a Sinner by Charlotte Thompson
- Starring: Constance Talmadge; Rockliffe Fellowes; Corliss Giles; William Roselle; Marjorie Milton; Evelyn Carter Carrington
- Cinematography: Oliver T. Marsh
- Production company: Constance Talmadge Film Company
- Distributed by: First National Exhibitors' Circuit
- Release date: March 7, 1920
- Running time: 50 minutes
- Country: United States
- Language: Silent (English intertitles)

In Search of a Sinner is a 1920 American silent comedy film directed by David Kirkland and written by John Emerson and Anita Loos. The film stars Constance Talmadge, Rockliffe Fellowes, Corliss Giles, William Roselle, Marjorie Milton and Evelyn Carter Carrington. The film was released on March 7, 1920, by First National Exhibitors' Circuit.

== Cast ==
- Constance Talmadge as Georgianna Chadbourne
- Rockliffe Fellowes as Jack Garrison
- Corliss Giles as Jeffrey
- William Roselle as Sam
- Marjorie Milton as Helen
- Evelyn Carter Carrington as Katie
- Lillian Worth as Valeska
- Arnold Lucy as Henry
- Slim Whitaker as Roue
- Ned Sparks as Waiter
- William Boshell as Policeman
