= Red Foam =

1920 film

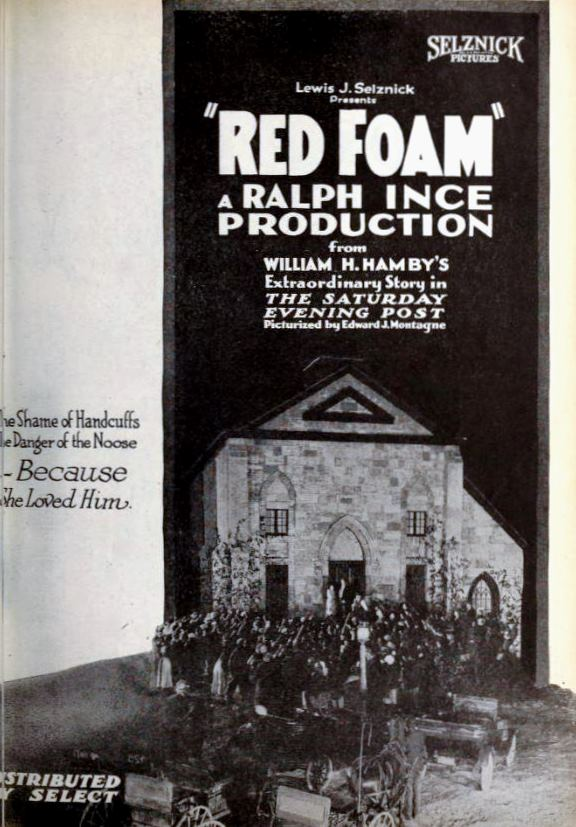
- Directed by: Ralph Ince
- Written by: William Henry Hamby; Edward J. Montagne
- Starring: Zena Keefe; Harry Tighe; Huntley Gordon
- Production company: Selznick Pictures
- Distributed by: Select Pictures
- Release date: October 20, 1920
- Running time: 50 minutes
- Country: United States
- Languages: Silent; English intertitles

Red Foam is a 1920 American silent drama film directed by Ralph Ince and starring Zena Keefe, Harry Tighe and Huntley Gordon.

== Cast ==
- Zena Keefe as Mrs. Andy Freeman
- Harry Tighe as Andy Freeman
- Huntley Gordon as Arnold Driscoll
- Danny Hayes as Sheriff
- Peggy Worth as Mrs. Murphy
- John Butler as Matt Murphy
- Nora Cecil as Undetermined Role

== Bibliography ==
- Monaco, James. The Encyclopedia of Film. Perigee Books, 1991.
