= Fanny's First Play =

Play by George Bernard Shaw

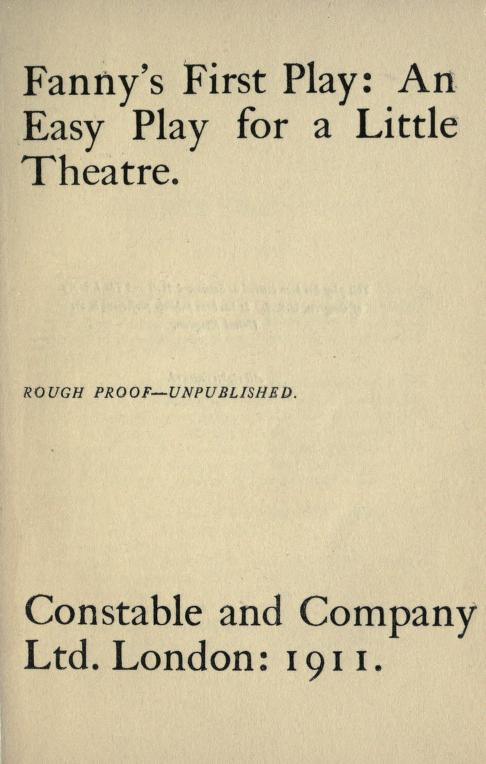
- Written by: George Bernard Shaw
- Original language: English
- Subject: Two respectable families learn to cope with wayward children
- Genre: satirical comedy
- Setting: A country house; residences in Denmark Hill

Premiere
- Date premiered: 19 April 1911
- Place premiered: Little Theatre in the Adelphi, London

Fanny's First Play is a 1911 play by George Bernard Shaw. It was first performed as an anonymous piece, the authorship of which was to be kept secret. However, critics soon recognised it as the work of Shaw. It opened at the Little Theatre in the Adelphi in London on 19 April 1911 and ran for 622 performances. The mystery over the authorship helped to publicise it. It had the longest run of any of Shaw's plays. A second production opened on Broadway on September 16, 1912 for 256 performances. The play toured the provinces in England in the same year.

It features a play within a play. The framing play is a satire of theatre critics, whose characters were based upon Shaw's own detractors, in some cases being caricatures of real critics of the day. The main play is a pastiche of the drawing room comedies in vogue at the time.

== Characters and original cast ==
Prologue and epilogue

- Servant – A. E Filmer
- Cecil Savoyard – Lewis Sealy
- Count O'Dowda – Harcourt Williams
- Fanny O'Dowda – Christine Silver
- Mr Trotter – Claude King
- Mr Vaughan – S. Creagh Henry
- Mr Gunn – Reginald Owen
- Flawner Bannal – Nigel Playfair

Fanny's Play

- Robin Gilbey – Fewlass Llewellyn
- Mrs Gilbey – Gwynneth Galton
- Juggins – H. K. Ayliff
- Dora Delaney – Dorothy Minto
- Mrs Knox – Cecily Hamilton
- Joseph Knox – Arnold Lucy
- Margaret Knox – Lillah McCarthy
- Lieutenant Duvallet – Raymond Lauzerte
- Bobby – Shiel Barry

Source: The Times.

== Plot ==
Prologue: In a country house, Fanny O'Dowda, the daughter of the Count O'Dowda, is putting on a play she has written. She has hired professional actors and invited major critics. Fanny, who has studied at Cambridge, is keeping her authorship secret. She expects that her father the Count will disapprove of the play, as he hates the vulgarity of modern life. He has only just returned to Britain from living in Venice.

Fanny's play:

- Act I. The Gilbeys, a genteel couple in Denmark Hill, are worried about their missing son Bobby. A vulgar street-girl called Dora Delaney (known as "Darling Dora") enters. She tells them that she and Bobby had been sent to prison. They were arrested for drunk and disorderly behaviour and assaulting a police officer. The Gilbeys are mortified. What will they say to Mr Knox, Gilbey's business partner, and his wife? The Knoxes' daughter is betrothed to Bobby.
- Act 2. The Knoxes learn that their daughter Margaret has been in prison when she returns home after being away for a fortnight. On the night of the Boat Race she and a young French officer called Duvallet she was with got into a fight with the police. Margaret feels liberated by the experience and wishes to tell everyone about it. The Knoxes are mortified. What will they say to the Gilbeys?
- Act 3. At the Gilbey household Bobby asks Juggins the footman how he can break up with Margaret without hurting her. Since his arrest he finds Margaret's dull respectability stifling. Margaret arrives and tells him of her imprisonment. Bobby is shocked, saying "It's not the same for a girl". Dora and Duvallet appear, to Bobby's embarrassment. When Margaret realises that the woman Bobby was with was Darling Dora, she is outraged. She had shared a cell with Dora, and now Bobby is treating her like she should be excluded from polite company. The Knoxes are announced. The four youngsters hide in the pantry with Juggins. The older couples, realising that they no longer need to keep up a facade of respectability, start to relax, though the pious Mrs Knox says that if they change the manners in which they have been brought up they will soon have nothing left. Meanwhile Margaret decides she no longer has any interest in Bobby. She really loves Juggins, the footman. Juggins reveals that he is the son of a Duke. He became a footman to atone for once mistreating an honest servant. Now that he has proven himself to be an honest working man, he feels worthy to marry Margaret.

Epilogue: Fanny's father is shocked by the play saying that it "outrages and revolts his deepest, holiest feelings". The critics have a variety of views, but wonder who the author may be. The aesthete Gilbert Gunn insists that's so full of tired clichės "as old and stale as a fried fish shop on a winter morning" that it must be by Harley Granville-Barker. Another critic, Vaughan, is convinced that only Arthur Pinero could have written it, since it betrays "the author's offensive habit of saying silly things that have no real sense in them when you come to examine them". Flawner Bannal, a critic from a tabloid, thinks it was written by Bernard Shaw, as the paradoxical statements about the English by the French character are a dead giveaway. Vaughan dismisses this because the characters are too believable: "That proves it's not by Shaw, because all Shaw's characters are himself: mere puppets stuck up to spout Shaw." One critic, Trotter, realises the truth. Fanny admits that she was the author, and the critics all join in praise of her. Trotter thinks that the account of imprisonment has an air of authenticity to it. Fanny confesses that, yes, she has been in prison, for her activities as a militant suffragette. Fanny's father now has to adjust to the fact that his daughter is both a malefactor and a playwright.

== Preface ==
Shaw introduced the published text of the work with a few words: "Being a potboiler it needs no preface. Its lesson is not, I am sorry to say, unneeded--that in an age when custom has been substituted for conscience, and the middle class are as dead as mutton, the young had better get into trouble to have their souls awakened by disgrace."

== Production and critical response ==
The play was first produced in April, 1911, having been hurriedly rehearsed because the previous production, of Ibsen's The Master Builder, had ended early. Shaw was convinced that creating a mystery about the authorship of the play would be ideal publicity. Because of the similarity of the character of Juggins to Crichton in J.M. Barrie's play The Admirable Crichton, Shaw hoped the public might be deceived. "Let people think the play is by Barrie" he said. He told Lillah McCarthy, who played the lead role, to "do everything to suggest the play is by Barrie". C. B. Purdom thinks that this might have worked had it not been for the framer play. "Had it not been for this audacity, there might have been a chance of mystifying the public about the authorship, for Shaw had written nothing so 'easy' and nothing so transparently sincere." The critics in the frame-play express various opinions of Shaw's works, but make only brief mention of other authors. Even the theatre programme identified the author as "Xxxxxxx Xxxx", a pattern of letters that clearly points to "Bernard Shaw". Despite this, Shaw maintained a facade of secrecy about the authorship when he was repeatedly questioned about it by reporters. He told the Pall Mall Gazette "nothing shall ever induce me to betray the authorship of Fanny's First Play. The performance last night was superb; and the audience enjoyed it as much as I did."

The play referred to the many criticisms that had been made of Shaw's own work, while also including digs at Granville-Barker (who ran the theatre company that performed it) and at the critics themselves. Three of the critics are based on real journalists A. B. Walkley is caricatured as "Trotter", Gilbert Cannan as "Gunn" and E. A. Baughan as "Vaughan". "Bannal", as his surname suggests, represents the most banal popular taste. Walkley, a friend of Shaw's, was aware of the plan beforehand. He helped to make Claude King, the actor playing Trotter, resemble himself in manner and clothing. In his review he joked that Trotter is a "pure figment of the imagination, wholly unlike any actual person". He praised the play highly saying that Shaw had created "one of the most amusing plays he had ever written, one of the wittiest and most audacious plays of all his attack on 'the mean things which men have to do to keep up their respectability'." A letter, purportedly written by Flawner Bannal "the critic of The Matutinal Meddler" was published in The Play Pictorial protesting that the supposedly anonymous play was being marketed with the quotation "'Bernard Shaw...at his best.'--The Daily Graphic."

== Adaptations ==
The play was adapted for Australian radio in 1942.
