= Heart Strings (1920 film) =

1920 film by J. Gordon Edwards

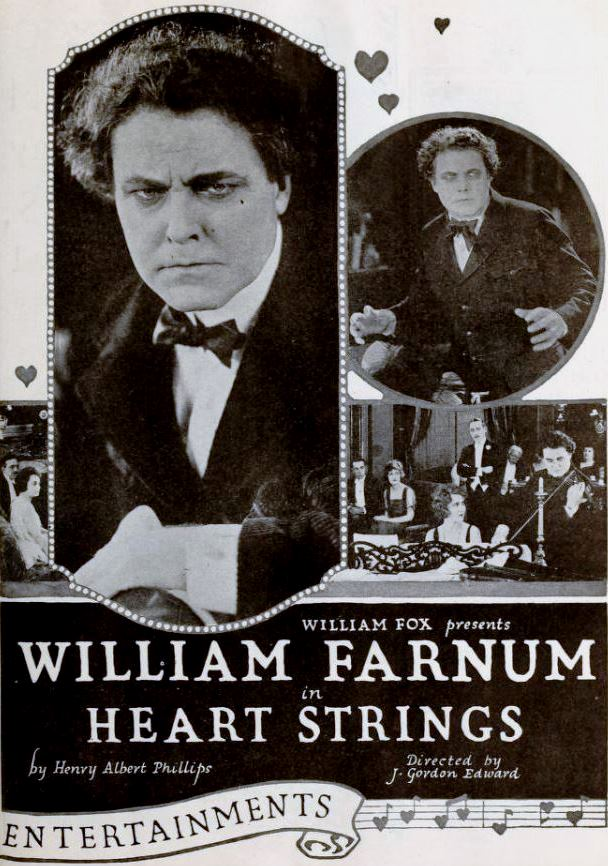
- Advertising for Heart Strings on page 23 of the Exhibitors Herald (December 27, 1919).
- Directed by: J. Gordon Edwards
- Written by: Henry Albert Phillips (story); E. Lloyd Sheldon
- Starring: William Farnum; Gladys Coburn; Betty Hilburn; Paul Cazeneuve
- Cinematography: John W. Boyle
- Production company: Fox Film Corporation
- Distributed by: Fox Film Corporation
- Release date: January 18, 1920
- Running time: 60 minutes
- Country: United States
- Languages: Silent film (English intertitles)

Heart Strings is a 1920 American silent drama film directed by J. Gordon Edwards and starring William Farnum, Gladys Coburn, Betty Hilburn, and Paul Cazeneuve. The film was released by Fox Film Corporation on January 18, 1920.

== Cast ==
- William Farnum as Pierre Fournel
- Gladys Coburn as Kathleen Noyes
- Betty Hilburn as Gabrielle
- Paul Cazeneuve as La Touche
- Robert Cain as Rupert Blake
- Rowland G. Edwards as Rouget
- Kate Blancke as Mrs. Noyes

== Preservation ==
It is unknown whether the film survives as no copies have been located, likely lost.
