= Out of the Snows =

1920 film

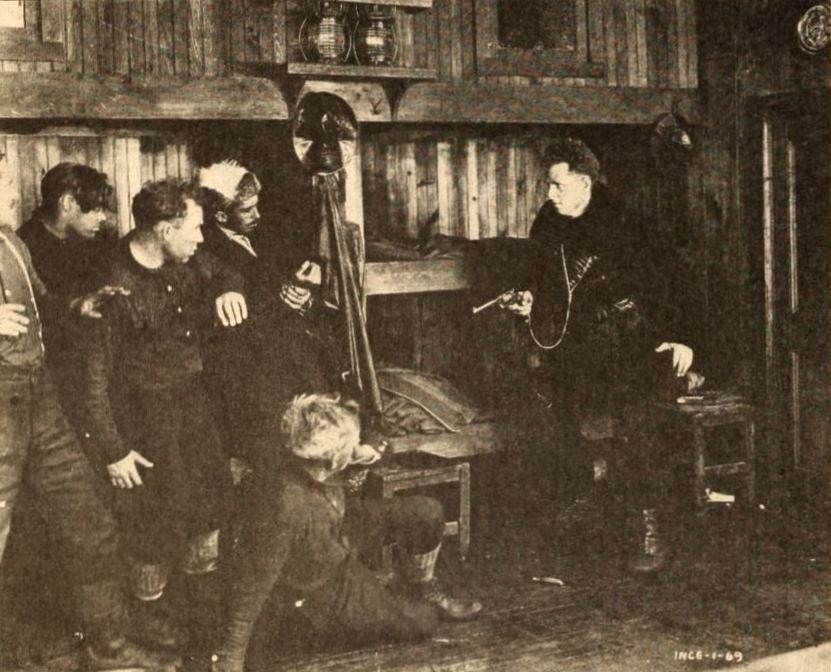
- Directed by: Ralph Ince
- Written by: E. Lord Corbett; Irvin J. Martin
- Produced by: Lewis J. Selznick
- Starring: Ralph Ince; Zena Keefe; Gladys Coburn
- Cinematography: William J. Black
- Production company: National Picture Theatres
- Distributed by: Selznick Pictures
- Release date: August 23, 1920
- Running time: 60 minutes
- Country: United States
- Languages: Silent; English intertitles

Out of the Snows is a 1920 American silent drama film directed by Ralph Ince and starring Ince, Zena Keefe and Gladys Coburn. It was filmed on location in Lake Placid, New York, with Whiteface Mountain as a backdrop.

== Plot ==
A member of the Canadian Mounted Police, Robert Holliday is engaged to Ruth Hardy, a young woman orphaned after the death of her father. On the eve of their wedding, Ruth learns from John Blakeman that he and her father had been partners in the fur trade, until her father was killed by Robert, her fiancé, during a shootout between police and smugglers. Shaken by that revelation, Ruth sends Robert a suicide note and leaves with Blakeman for a trading post located on Sampson's Pass. When Robert is later sent on duty at the pass, he sets out in search of his ex-girlfriend. Blakeman warns him to stay away. Meanwhile, Anitah, a mountie who is in love with Robert, kills a man who was harassing her, and Robert is ordered to arrest her; he, after managing to catch her, learns from Anitah that the real killer of Hardy was Blakeman himself. The mountie then sets out on the trail of the hunter, who will be killed while trying to escape. Now, with the evidence of Blakeman's guilt provided to him by Anitah, Robert can return to Ruth and reconcile with her.

== Cast ==
- Ralph Ince as Robert Holliday
- Zena Keefe as Anitah
- Pat Hartigan as John Blakeman
- Gladys Coburn as Ruth Hardy
- Huntley Gordon as Sgt. Graham
- Red Eagle as Lone Deer
- Jacques Suzanne as Antoine Dufresne

== Reviews ==
The critic for the Calgary Herald called the film "especially interesting" because of the "fast-growing practice of movie making by a director and a story teller working hand in hand on the spot."

== Bibliography ==
- Connelly, Robert B. The Silents: Silent Feature Films, 1910-36, Volume 40, Issue 2. December Press, 1998.
