= Bertram Marburgh =

American actor

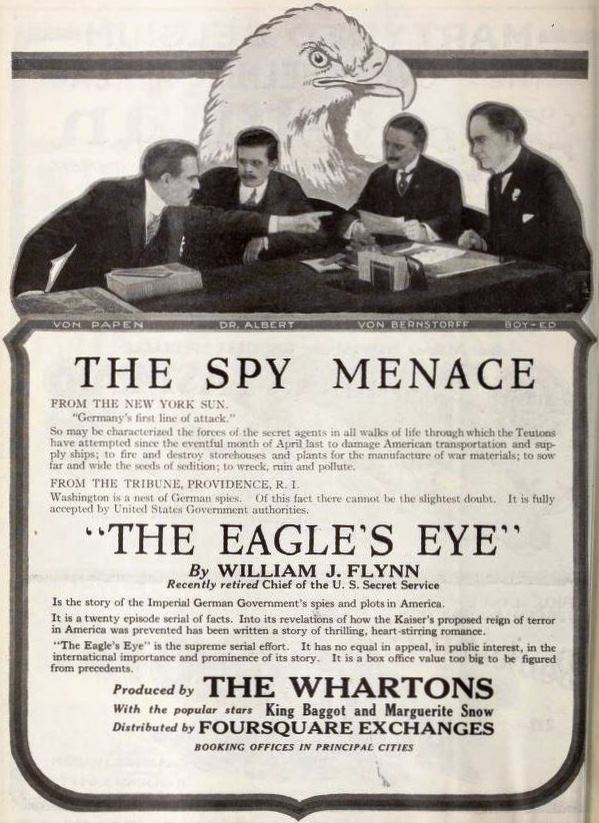
- Marburgh (second from right) in an advertisement for The Eagle's Eye (1918)
- Born: May 17, 1875; New York, New York, United States
- Died: August 22, 1956 (aged 81); Los Angeles, California, United States
- Occupation: Actor
- Years active: 1915–1945 (film)

Bertram Marburgh (May 17, 1875 – August 22, 1956) was an American stage and film actor. He appeared as a character actor in around thirty five films between 1915 and 1945.

== Selected filmography ==
- After Dark (1915)
- The Stolen Voice (1915)
- The Broken Law (1915)
- The Rail Rider (1916)
- The Eagle's Eye (1918)
- The Social Pirate (1919)
- Checkers (1919)
- The Greatest Love (1920)
- Timothy's Quest (1922)
- A Streak of Luck (1925)
- His People (1925)
- The Outsider (1926)
- Unknown Treasures (1926)
- Silken Shackles (1926)
- The Woman on Trial (1927)
- An Affair of the Follies (1927)
- The Play Girl (1928)
- For the Defense (1930)
- They Just Had to Get Married (1932)
- Before I Hang (1940)
- Kitty Foyle (1940)
- The Hard-Boiled Canary (1941)
- The Lady Eve (1941)
- Crossroads (1942)
- A Gentleman at Heart (1942)
- Too Many Women (1942)
- The Human Comedy (1943)
- The Heavenly Body (1944)
- The Lost Weekend (1945)

== Bibliography ==
- Dietz, Dan. The Complete Book of 1910s Broadway Musicals. Rowman & Littlefield, 2021.
- Munden, Kenneth White. The American Film Institute Catalog of Motion Pictures Produced in the United States, Part 1. University of California Press, 1997.
- Rainey, Buck. Serials and Series: A World Filmography, 1912-1956. McFarland, 2015.
