= The Greatest Love (1920 film) =

1920 film

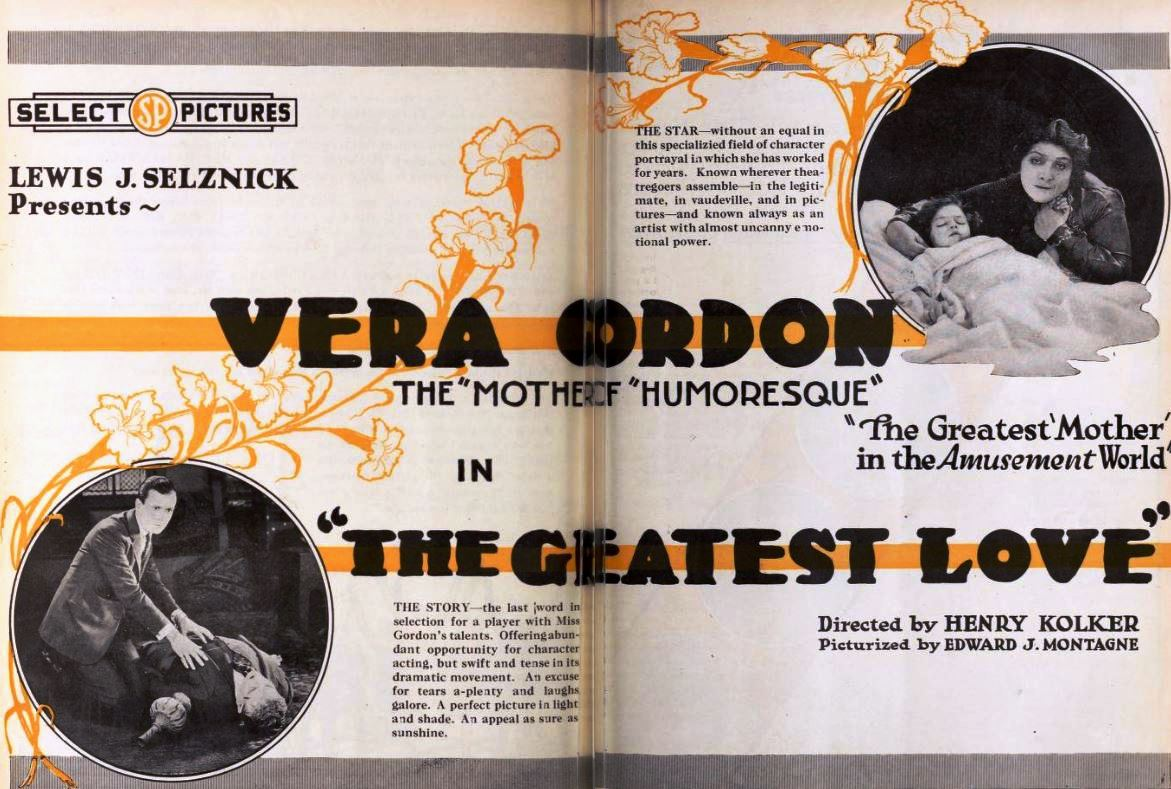
- Directed by: Henry Kolker
- Written by: Eddie Dowling; Edward J. Montagne
- Produced by: Lewis J. Selznick; Harry Rapf
- Starring: Vera Gordon; Bertram Marburgh; Sally Crute
- Cinematography: Jules Cronjager; Alfred Gandolfi; Phil Rosen
- Production company: Select Pictures
- Distributed by: Select Pictures
- Release date: December 1920
- Running time: 60 minutes
- Country: United States
- Languages: Silent; English intertitles

The Greatest Love is a 1920 American silent drama film directed by Henry Kolker and starring Vera Gordon, Bertram Marburgh and Sally Crute. The film follows the fortunes of an Italian immigrant family the Latinis who arrive in New York around the turn of the century. It built on Gordon's previous role as a long-suffering Jewish mother in Humoresque.

== Cast ==
- Vera Gordon as Mrs. Lantini
- Bertram Marburgh as Mr. Lantini
- Yvonne Shelton as Francesca Lantini
- Hugh Huntley as Lorenzo Lantini
- William H. Tooker as Mr. Manton
- Raye Dean as Dorothy Manton
- Donald Hall as Richard Sewall
- Sally Crute as Mrs. Sewall
- Jessie Simpson as Mrs. McCarthy

== Bibliography ==
- Connelly, Robert B. The Silents: Silent Feature Films, 1910-36, Volume 40, Issue 2. December Press, 1998.
- Erens, Patricia. The Jew in American Cinema. Indiana University Press, 1984.
- Munden, Kenneth White. The American Film Institute Catalog of Motion Pictures Produced in the United States, Part 1. University of California Press, 1997.
