= R. F. Schabelitz =

American painter

Rudolph Frederick Schabelitz (1884 – July 2, 1959) was an American illustrator, comics artist painter and author who was regularly featured in national periodicals. He illustrated several artist-themed murder mysteries by Willetta Ann Barber including Drawn Conclusion, Murder Enters the Picture, Drawback to Murder, Pencil Points to Murder, and Murder Draws a Line.

Born in Staten Island, New York, he was the son of artist Charles F. Schabelitz. He studied at the Art Students League of New York and was part of the Salmagundi Club and societies for illustrators and independent artists.

In 1913 he illustrated Garford Company automobile advertisements.

He illustrated Charles Neville Buck's 1916 novel Destiny and The Lighted Match. He also illustrated When Tragedy Grins by Grace Miller White. He also illustrated The green god (1911) by Frederic Arnold Kummer.

Schabelitz illustrated Inez Haynes Gillmore's "Phoebe and Ernest" books in 1912. His illustrations were also published in Harper's Magazine and Shadow Magazine.
