= The Primitive Call =

1917 film by Bertram Bracken

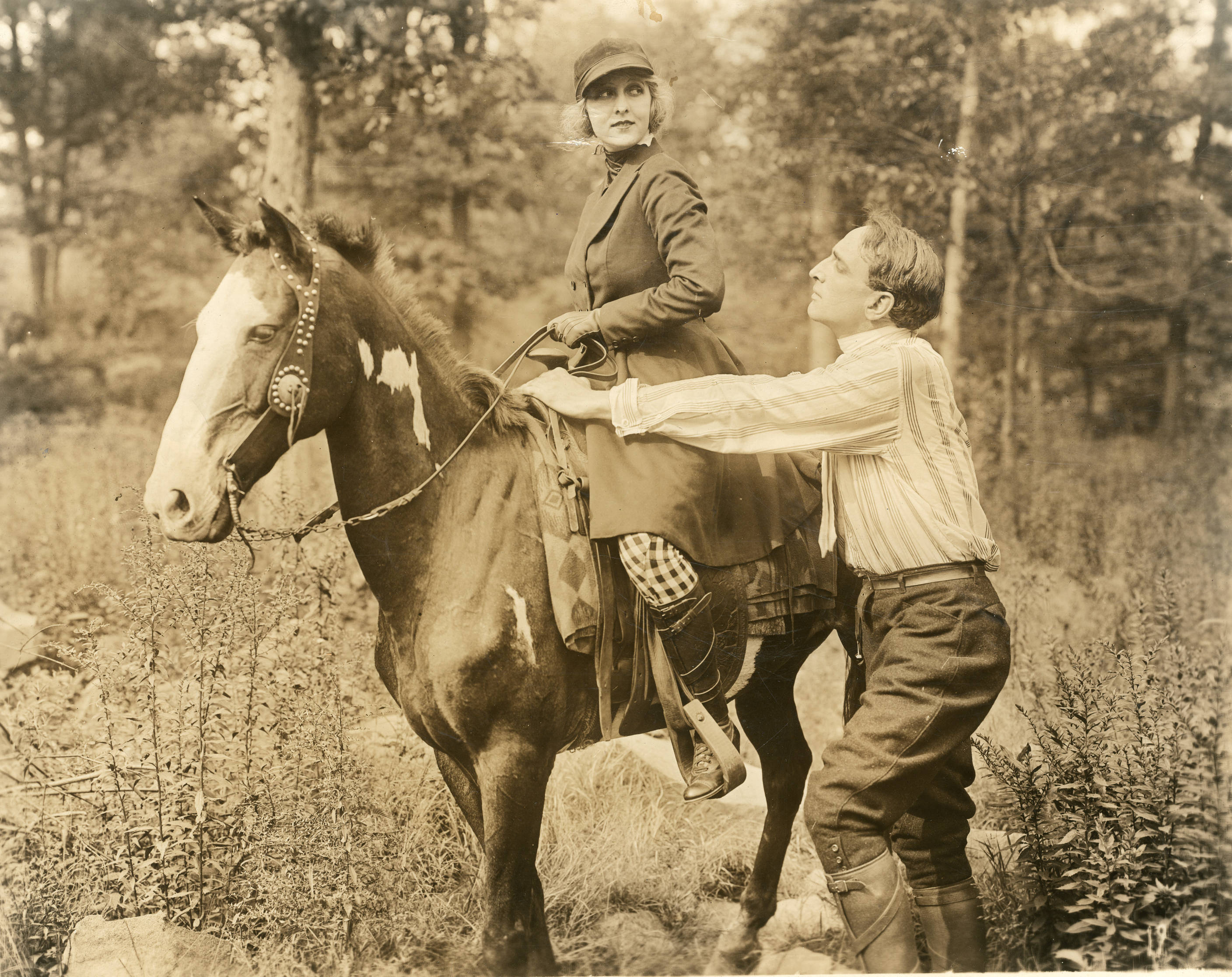
- Still with Coburn and Leiber
- Directed by: Bertram Bracken
- Written by: Bertram Bracken
- Starring: Gladys Coburn; Fritz Leiber; John Webb Dillion
- Cinematography: Rial Schellinger
- Production company: Fox Film
- Distributed by: Fox Film
- Release date: January 22, 1917
- Running time: 50 minutes
- Country: United States
- Language: Silent (English intertitles)

The Primitive Call is a 1917 American silent drama film directed by Bertram Bracken and starring Gladys Coburn, Fritz Leiber, and John Webb Dillion.

== Cast ==
- Gladys Coburn as Betty Malcolm
- Fritz Leiber as Brain Elkhorn
- John Webb Dillion as Bart Jennings
- George Larkin as Percy Malcolm
- Lewis Sealy as John Malcolm
- Velma Whitman as Elsie Jennings
- Kittens Reichert as Buttons Jennings

== Bibliography ==
- Solomon, Aubrey. The Fox Film Corporation, 1915-1935: A History and Filmography. McFarland, 2011.
