= The Woman God Sent =

1920 film

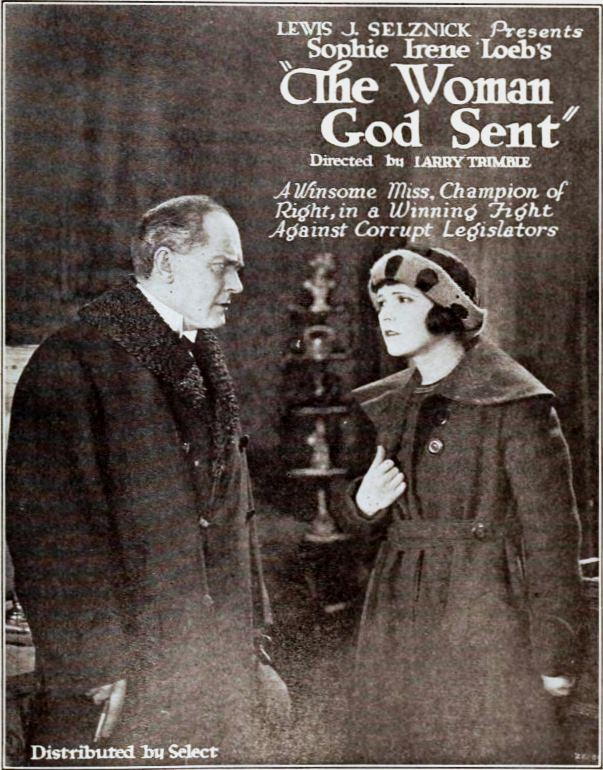
- Directed by: Laurence Trimble
- Written by: Sophie Irene Loeb; Laurence Trimble
- Produced by: Lewis J. Selznick
- Starring: Zena Keefe; Warren Cook; Joe King
- Cinematography: Alfred Gandolfi; Harold S. Sintzenich
- Production company: Selznick Pictures
- Distributed by: Selznick Pictures
- Release date: May 1, 1920
- Running time: 60 minutes
- Country: United States
- Languages: Silent; English intertitles

The Woman God Sent is a 1920 American silent drama film directed by Laurence Trimble and starring Zena Keefe, Warren Cook and Joe King.

== Cast ==
- Zena Keefe as Margaret Manning
- Warren Cook as Jack West Sr.
- Joe King as Jack West Jr.
- William Frederic as Senator Mathews
- William Gudgeon as Pat Kane
- Louise Powell as Rosie
- William Magner as Joe
- Duncan Penwarden as Mason
- John P. Wade as Jim Connelly

== Bibliography ==
- Connelly, Robert B. The Silents: Silent Feature Films, 1910-36, Volume 40, Issue 2. December Press, 1998.
