= Ida Darling =

American actress (1880–1936)

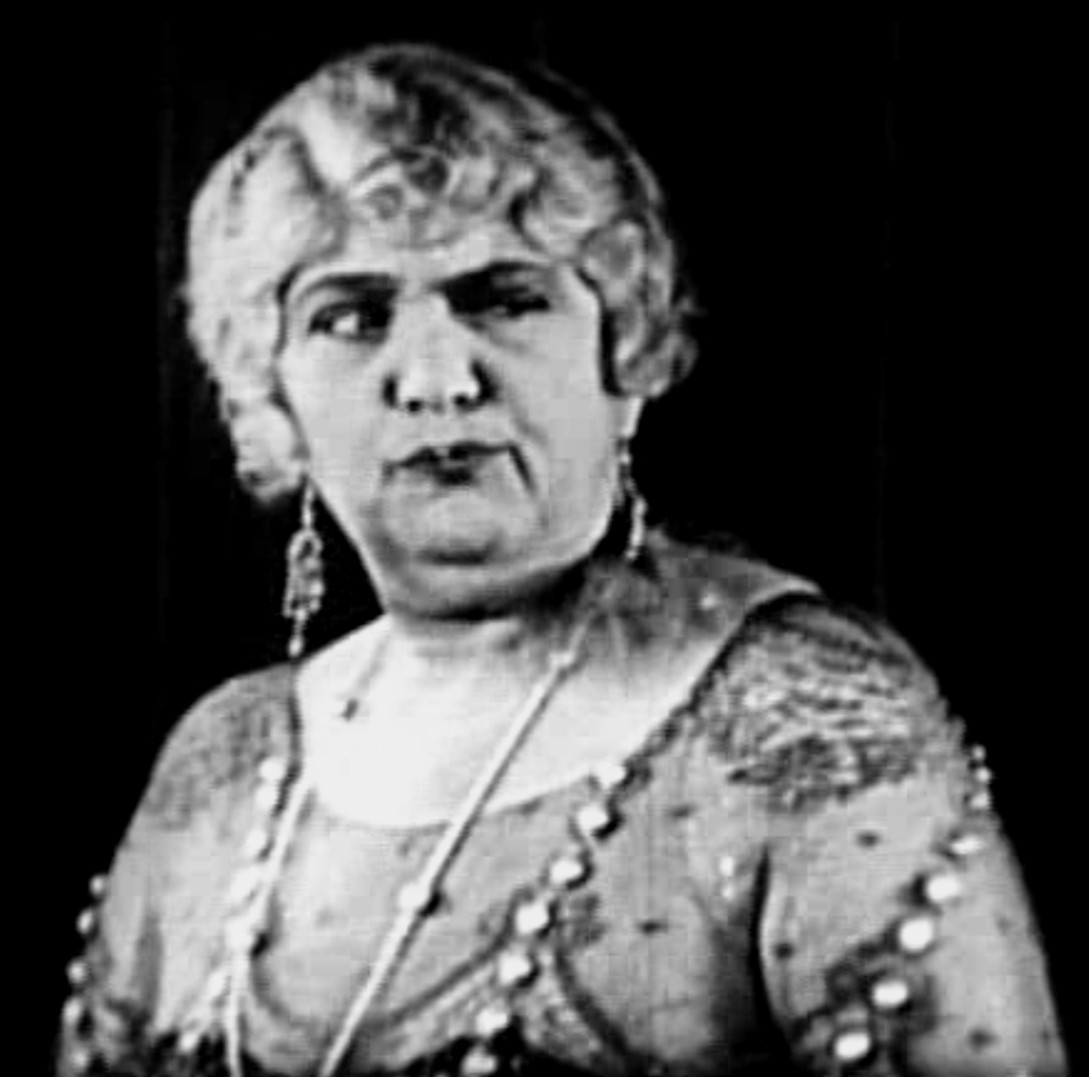
- Darling in Irene (1926)
- Born: February 3, 1880; New York City, U.S.
- Died: June 5, 1936 (aged 56); Hollywood, California, U.S.
- Resting place: Hollywood Forever Cemetery
- Occupation: Actress
- Years active: 1913–1935

Ida Darling (February 23, 1880 – June 5, 1936) was an American actress of the stage and in silent motion pictures.

== Biography ==
Darling was born in New York City. She performed on the New York stage for 40 years. During the 10 years she resided in California, she was under contract to David Selznick as part of the Selznick Pictures Corporation stock company.

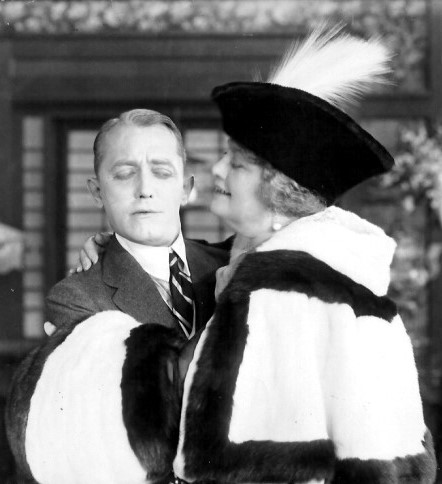
George M. Cohan and Darling in Broadway Jones (1917)

Darling appeared in 53 movies from 1913 to 1935. In 1925, she was in the cast of Irene, a film made by First National Pictures, which starred Colleen Moore. The Wild Westcotts, a Vine Street Theater comedy of the 1927 season, featured Darling and Glenda Farrell as cast members. Among her films of the sound era is Lummox (1929).

On Broadway, Darling appeared in Please Get Married (1919), The Land of the Free (1917), Common Clay (1915), A Full House (1915), Rachel (1913), Uncle Sam (1911), Children of Destiny (1910), The Embassy Ball (1906), The Vinegar Buyer (1903), Her Lord and Master (1902), and Cupid Outwits Adam (1900).

Darling died at St. Vincent's Hospital in Los Angeles at the age of 56 and was cremated at Hollywood Cemetery. Funeral services were carried out by Gates, Crane & Earl Mortuary.

== Partial filmography ==
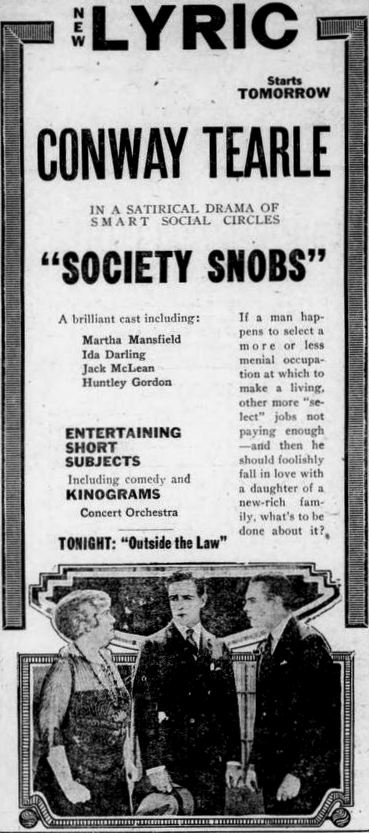
Darling at left in ad for Society Snobs (1921)

- The Nightingale (1914)
- The Morals of Marcus (1915)
- Helene of the North (1915)
- The Masqueraders (1915)
- The Lost Bridegroom (1916)
- Davy Crockett (1916)
- Under Cover (1916)
- The Test (1916)
- The Big Sister (1916)
- Broadway Jones (1917)
- Heart's Desire (1917)
- When Love Was Blind (1917)
- Scandal (1917) as Mrs. Vanderdyke
- Mrs. Dane's Defense (1918)
- The Ghosts of Yesterday (1918)
- By Right of Purchase (1918)
- Men (1918)
- The Make-Believe Wife (1918)
- The Man Who Stayed at Home (1919)
- Three Men and a Girl (1919)
- She Loves and Lies (1920)
- Whispers (1920)
- Marooned Hearts (1920)
- The Dangerous Paradise (1920)
- The Woman Game (1920)
- Wedding Bells (1921)
- Society Snobs (1921)
- Nobody (1921)
- The Ruling Passion (1922)
- Destiny's Isle (1922)
- The Exciters (1923)
- Meddling Women (1924)
- Heart of a Siren (1925)
- The Sky Raider (1925)
- Irene (1926)
- Stranded in Paris (1926)
- Singed (1927)
- The House of Scandal (1928)
- A Woman Against the World (1928)
- Lummox (1930)
- Here Comes the Navy (1934)
- The Mighty Barnum (1934)
- The Girl Who Came Back (1935)
