= Corliss Giles =

American actor

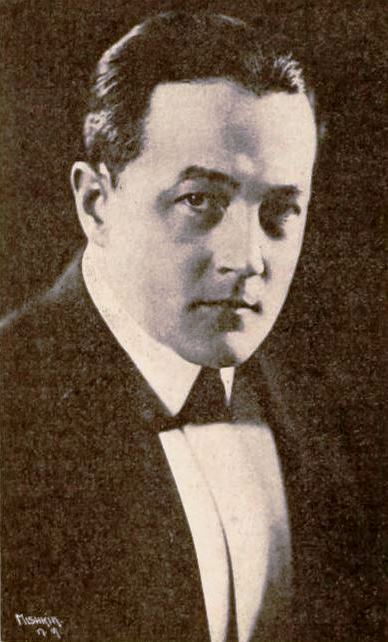
- From a 1920 magazine
- Occupation: Actor
- Spouse: Frances Nielson Giles (m. 1914; div. 1922)

Corliss Giles was an actor during the silent film era in the United States. He had starring roles including in the 1917 film Shirley Kaye, Voices in 1920, and The Mountain Woman in 1921. He also appeared in several theatrical productions.

In 1922 he was part of the Brownell Players and lived in New York City. In 1922 he filed for divorce from Frances Nielson Giles who he married in 1914.

== Partial filmography ==
- Shirley Kaye (1917) as John Rowson
- The Marionettes (1918) as Pierre Vareine
- The House of Glass (1918) as Harvey Lake
- In Search of a Sinner (1920) as Jeffrey
- The Blue Pearl (1920) as Wilfred Scott
- Voices (1920)
- The Mountain Woman (1921), starring role
