= The Rail Rider =

1916 film by Maurice Tourneur

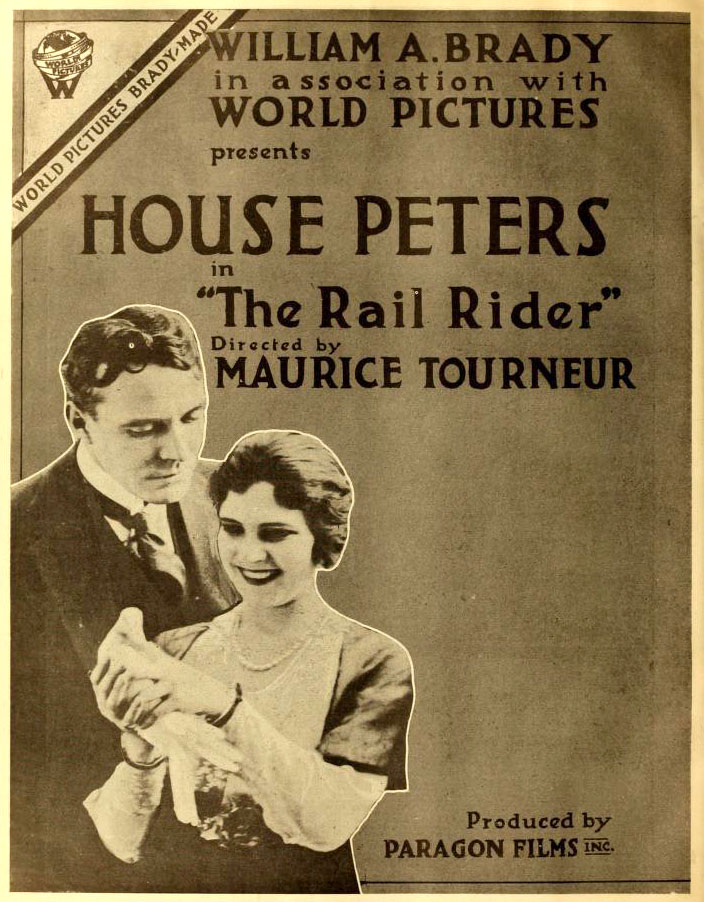
- Advertisement
- Directed by: Maurice Tourneur
- Written by: Edgar Franklin
- Starring: House Peters; Bertram Marburgh; Henry West
- Cinematography: John van den Broek
- Edited by: Clarence Brown
- Production company: Paragon Films
- Distributed by: World Film
- Release date: August 21, 1916
- Running time: 5 reels
- Country: United States
- Language: Silent (English intertitles)

The Rail Rider is a 1916 American silent drama film directed by Maurice Tourneur and starring House Peters, Bertram Marburgh, and Henry West. Prints and/or fragments were found in the Dawson Film Find in 1978.

The film's sets were designed by the art director Ben Carré.

== Cast ==
- House Peters as Jim Lewis
- Bertram Marburgh as 'B,' the enigma of the D & O
- Henry West as Bill Carney
- A. Harrington as Theodore C Barker
- Zena Keefe as Mildred Barker

== Preservation status ==
Fragmentary prints of The Rail Rider survive in the Library of Congress and the Dawson City collection of the Library and Archives Canada.

== Bibliography ==
- Waldman, Harry. Maurice Tourneur: The Life and Films. McFarland, 2001.
