= The Marionettes (film) =

1918 film

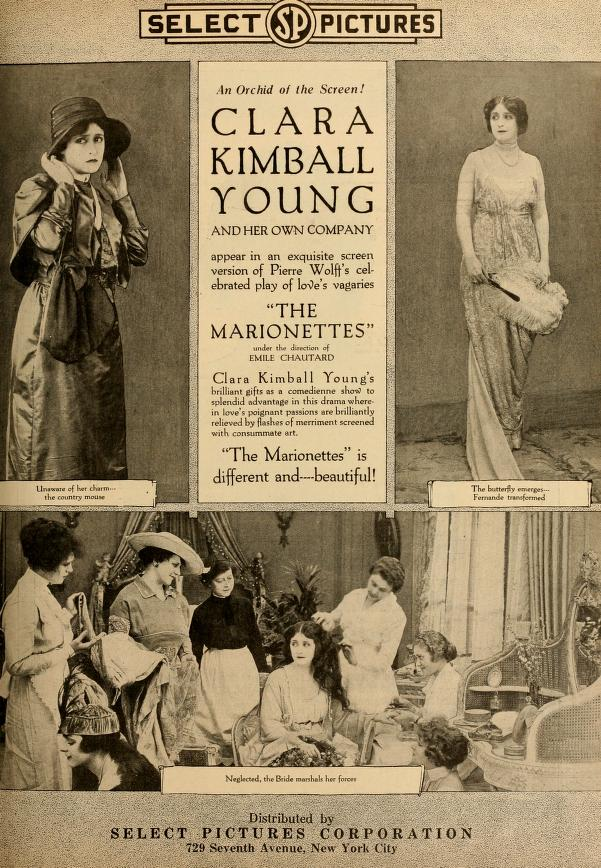
- Advertisement
- Directed by: Émile Chautard
- Written by: Pierre Wolff (play); Frederick Chapin
- Produced by: Clara Kimball Young
- Starring: Clara Kimball Young; Nigel Barrie; Alec B. Francis
- Cinematography: Jacques Bizeul
- Production company: Clara Kimball Young Film Corporation
- Distributed by: Select Pictures
- Release date: January 1918
- Running time: 5 reels
- Country: United States
- Language: Silent (English intertitles)

The Marionettes is a 1918 American silent comedy film directed by Émile Chautard and starring Clara Kimball Young, Nigel Barrie, and Alec B. Francis.

== Cast ==
- Clara Kimball Young as Fernande de Monclars
- Nigel Barrie as Roger de Monclars
- Alec B. Francis as Nizerolles
- Florence Atkinson as Madame de Jussy
- Helen Simpson as Madame de Valmont
- Madeline Cadeux as Madame de Briey
- Hazel Washburn as Baronne Durieu
- Louise Bates as Madame de Lancey
- Carey L. Hastings as Julie
- Corliss Giles as Pierre Vareine
- Edward Kimball as Professor de Ferney
- Ethel Winthrop as Marquise de Monclars
- Sam V. Phillips (Undetermined Role)
- John Dudley (Undetermined Role)
- Henry Warwick (Undetermined Role)
- Robert White (Undetermined Role)
- Henry Law (Undetermined Role)
- Arthur Marion (Undetermined Role)
- John Gaylor (Undetermined Role)

== Bibliography ==
- Donald W. McCaffrey & Christopher P. Jacobs. Guide to the Silent Years of American Cinema. Greenwood Publishing, 1999. ISBN 0-313-30345-2
