= His Wife's Money =

1920 film

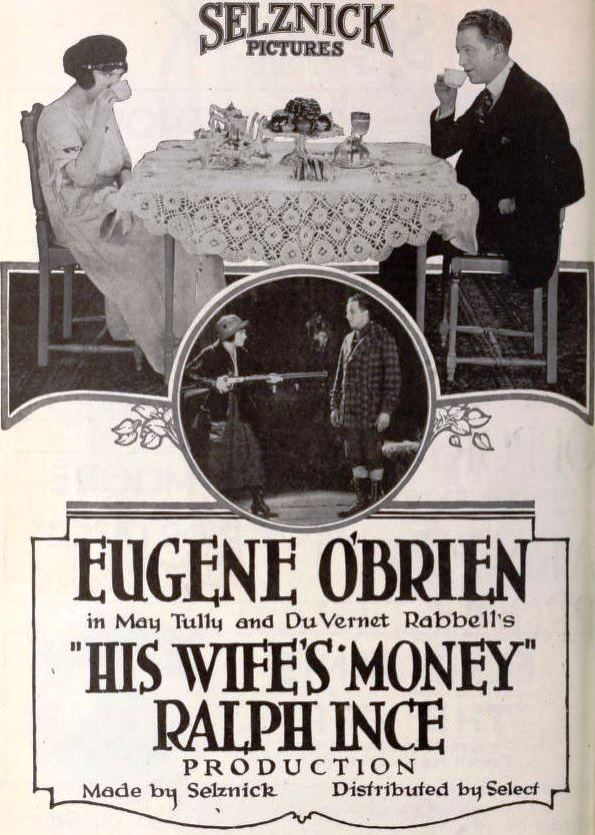
- Directed by: Ralph Ince
- Written by: E. Lord Corbett; Du Vernet Rabell; R. Cecil Smith; May Tully
- Starring: Eugene O'Brien; Zena Keefe; Louise Prussing
- Cinematography: William J. Black; Charles Levine
- Edited by: W. Duncan Mansfield
- Production company: Selznick Pictures
- Distributed by: Select Pictures
- Release date: February 1920
- Running time: 50 minutes
- Country: United States
- Languages: Silent; English intertitles

His Wife's Money is a 1920 American silent drama film directed by Ralph Ince and starring Eugene O'Brien, Zena Keefe and Louise Prussing.

== Cast ==
- Eugene O'Brien as Richard Flint
- Zena Keefe as Marion Phillips
- Ned Hay as Bob Uppington
- Louise Prussing as Eva Uppington
- Cyril Chadwick as James Cardwell
- Dorothy Kent as Mrs. Ralph

== Bibliography ==
- Connelly, Robert B. The Silents: Silent Feature Films, 1910-36, Volume 40, Issue 2. December Press, 1998.
- Munden, Kenneth White. The American Film Institute Catalog of Motion Pictures Produced in the United States, Part 1. University of California Press, 1997.
