= Those Who Judge =

1924 silent film

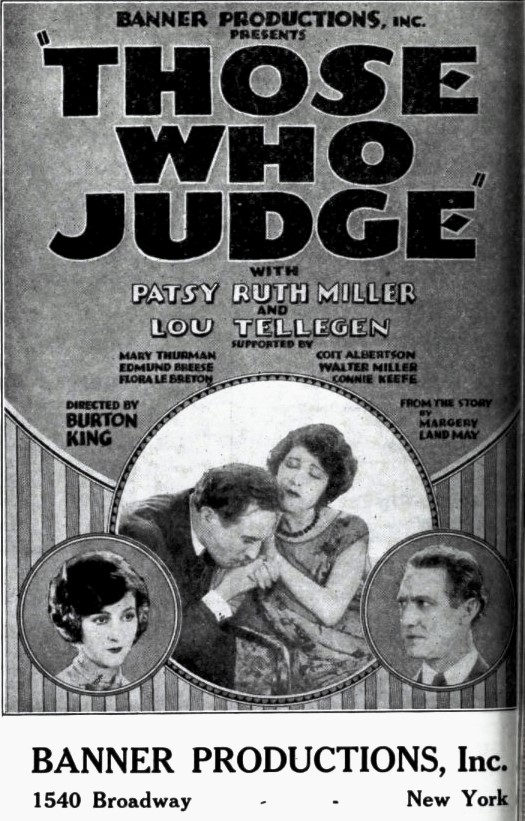
- Advertisement
- Directed by: Burton L. King
- Written by: Harry Chandlee
- Based on: Such As Sit in Judgement by Margery Land May
- Starring: Patsy Ruth Miller; Lou Tellegen; Mary Thurman
- Production company: Banner Productions
- Distributed by: Henry Ginsberg Distributing Company
- Release date: October 15, 1924
- Running time: 60 minutes
- Country: United States
- Language: Silent (English intertitles)

Those Who Judge is a lost 1924 American silent drama film directed by Burton L. King and starring Patsy Ruth Miller, Lou Tellegen, and Mary Thurman.

== Plot ==
As described in a film magazine, any romance between Angelique Dean and John Dawson is shattered when she confesses that she has been made the victim of a mock marriage during World War I. Chapman Griswold, who knows the facts tries to force her to marry him, but is prevented, when John learns at the deathbed of Angelique's deceiver, Major Twilling, the truth about her noble self sacrifice on behalf of her sister and also that the mock marriage was one in name only.

== Cast ==
- Patsy Ruth Miller as Angelique Dean
- Lou Tellegen as John Dawson
- Mary Thurman as Katty Drexel
- Flora le Breton as Shirley Norton
- Edmund Breese as Henry Dawson
- Walter Miller as Bob Dawson
- Coit Albertson as Chapman Griswold
- Cornelius Keefe as Tom Eustace
- John Henry as Major Twilling

== Preservation ==
With no holdings located in archives, Those Who Judge is considered a lost film.

== Bibliography ==
- Munden, Kenneth White. The American Film Institute Catalog of Motion Pictures Produced in the United States, Part 1. University of California Press, 1997.
