= Shirley Kaye =

1917 film by Joseph Kaufman

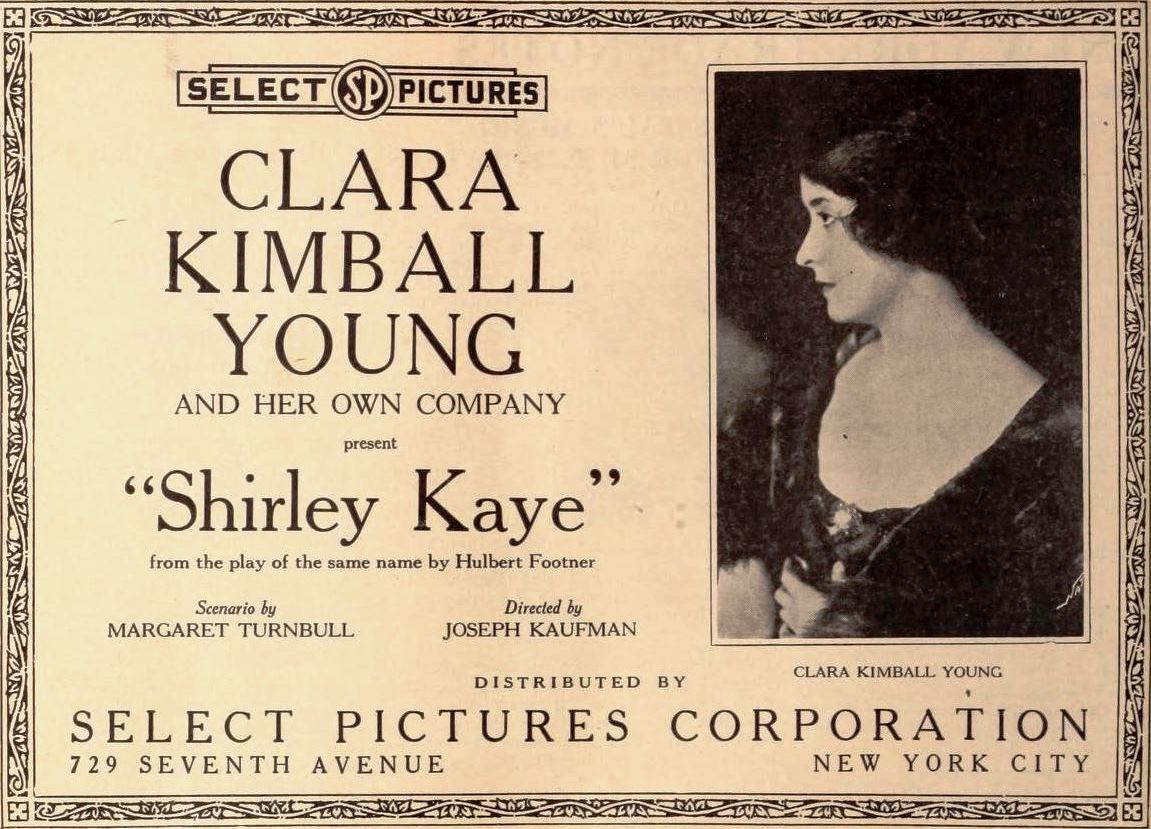
- Directed by: Joseph Kaufman
- Written by: Hulbert Footner (play); Margaret Turnbull
- Produced by: Clara Kimball Young; Lewis J. Selznick
- Starring: Clara Kimball Young; Corliss Giles; George Fawcett
- Cinematography: William Marshall
- Production company: Clara Kimball Young Film Corporation
- Distributed by: Selznick Pictures
- Release date: December 29, 1917
- Running time: 5 reels
- Country: United States
- Languages: Silent; English intertitles

Shirley Kaye is a lost 1917 American silent comedy-drama film directed by Joseph Kaufman and starring Clara Kimball Young, Corliss Giles and George Fawcett.

== Cast ==
- Clara Kimball Young as Shirley Kaye
- Corliss Giles as John Rowson
- George Fawcett as T.L. Magen
- George Backus as Egerton Kaye
- Claire Whitney as Daisy Magen
- Nellie Lindrith as Mrs. Magen
- John Sunderland as Earl Rosselvin
- Mrs. F.O. Winthrop as Mrs. Bayliss
- Frank Otto as Dingwall

== Bibliography ==
- Paul C. Spehr. The Movies Begin: Making Movies in New Jersey, 1887-1920. Newark Museum, 1977.
