= The Fatal Hour (1920 film) =

1920 film by George Terwilliger

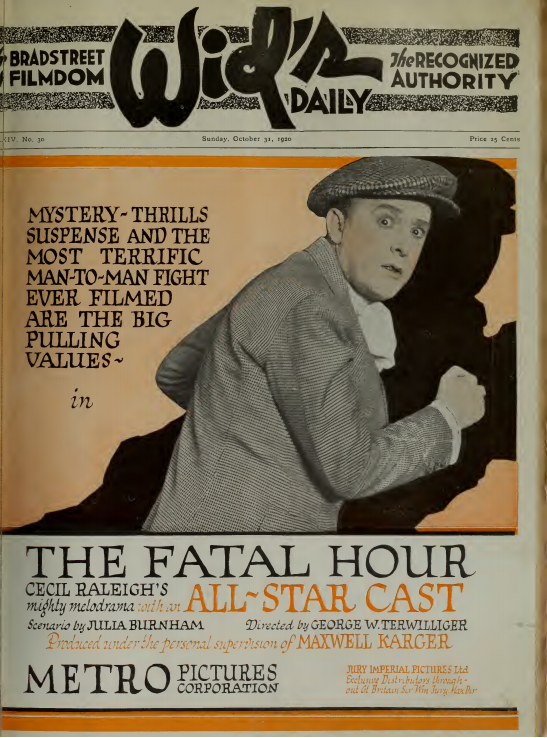
- Wid's Daily advert
- Directed by: George W. Terwilliger
- Written by: Julia Burnham
- Based on: play by Cecil Raleigh
- Produced by: Maxwell Karger
- Starring: Thomas W. Ross; Wilfred Lytell
- Cinematography: Louis J. Dunmyre
- Production company: Metro Pictures
- Distributed by: Metro Pictures
- Release date: November 1, 1920
- Running time: 60 minutes
- Country: United States
- Language: Silent (English intertitles)

The Fatal Hour is a lost 1920 American feature-length silent film directed by George W. Terwilliger. It starred Broadway star Thomas W. Ross and Wilfred Lytell, and was released by Metro Pictures.

== Cast ==
- Thomas W. Ross - Jim Callender
- Wilfred Lytell - Nigel Villiers
- Frank Conlan - Lord Adolphus Villiers (credited as Francis X. Conlan)
- Lionel Pape - The Duke of Exmoor
- Jack Crosby - Dudley
- Henry Hallam - Anthony
- Louis Sealy - Felix (credited as Louis Sealey)
- Frank Currier - The Abbot
- Gladys Coburn - Dorothy Gore
- Thea Talbot - Bessie Bissett
- Jennie Dickerson - Mrs. Bissett
- Florence Court - Lily de Mario
- Marie Schaefer - Lady Margaret Villiers (credited as Marie Shaffer)
- Effie Conley - Sally

== Production ==
The Fatal Hour was filmed at Metro's East Coast facility in Manhattan, and exterior scenes showing the Tower of London were taken at sets built along the river in Stamford, Connecticut, under the supervision of art director M.P. Staulcup.
