= Charles Neville Buck =

American novelist (1879–1957)

- Born: April 15, 1879; Woodford County, Kentucky, U.S.
- Died: August 10, 1957 (aged 78); Brookline, Norfolk County, Massachusetts, US
- Education: University of Louisville
- Occupation: Novelist

Charles Neville Buck (April 15, 1879 – August 10, 1957) was an American writer who had many of his novels staged in theater productions and adapted into films during the silent film era. He was born in Woodford County, Kentucky. His father Charles William Buck served U.S. president Grover Cleveland's administration in Peru and wrote Under the Sun about the Inca period. His maternal grandfather was dean of the University of Kentucky Medical School.

Buck was born near Midway, Kentucky and grew up in Kentucky apart from four years living with his father in South America. Buck graduated from the University of Louisville in 1898.

Many of his works were serialized such as Battle Cry in Munsey's Magazine. The story was set in Kentucky's Cumberland Mountains. Several of his novels include illustrations by various artists.

His work includes yarns about the mountain men of Kentucky and their traditions.

He worked for a year as a cartoonist and then for about a decade as reporter in Kentucky. He moved to New York City after finding success as a writer. He married and acquired a vacation home in Orleans in Cape Cod, Massachusetts.

Buck also published under the pseudonym Hugh Lundsford.

== Bibliography ==
- The Lighted Match (1910)
- The Key to Yesterday (1910)
- Portal of Dreams (1912)
- Call of the Cumberlands (1913), a light reworking of The Strength of Samson
- The Battle Cry (1914)
- The Code of the Mountains (1915)
- Destiny (1916)
- The Tyranny of Weakness (1917)
- When 'Bear Cat' Went Dry (1918)
- A Pagan of the Hills (1919)
- The Law of Hemlock Mountain (c. 1920)
- The Tempering (1920)
- The Roof Tree (1921)
- The Tyranny of Eben Tollman (1923)
- A Gentleman in Pajamas (1924)
- Rogue's Badge (1924)
- Portuguese Silver (1925)
- The Flight to the Hills (1926)
- Iron Will (1927)
- Hazard of the Hills (1932)

== Filmography ==
- The Key to Yesterday (1914)
- A Woman's Power (1916) based on his novel The Code of the Mountains
- Her Man (1918 film) based on his novel The Battle Cry
- The Call of the Cumberlands (1916)
- Destiny (1919)
- When Bearcat Went Dry (1919), based on his novel When 'Bear Cat' Went Dry
- Love, Honor and Obey (1920) based on his novel The Tyranny of Weakness
- The Mountain Woman (1921) based on his novel A Pagan of the Hills
- The Runaway (1926) based on his novel The Flight to the Hills
