= Selznick Pictures =

American film company

- Type: Film studio
- Industry: Film industry
- Founded: April 1916; 110 years ago
- Founder: Lewis J. Selznick
- Defunct: 1923
- Fate: Purchased by Universal Pictures
- Successor: Selznick International Pictures

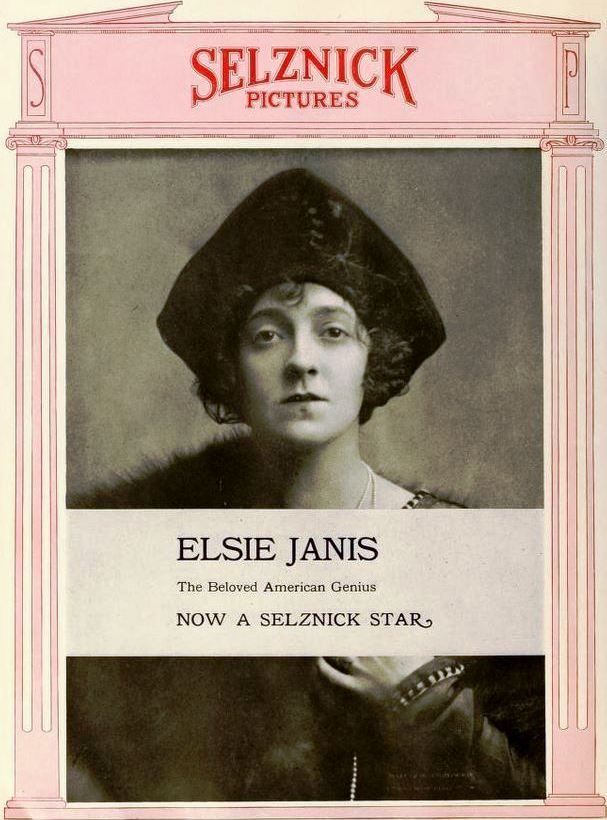
Trade advertisement with Selznick Pictures logo at top.

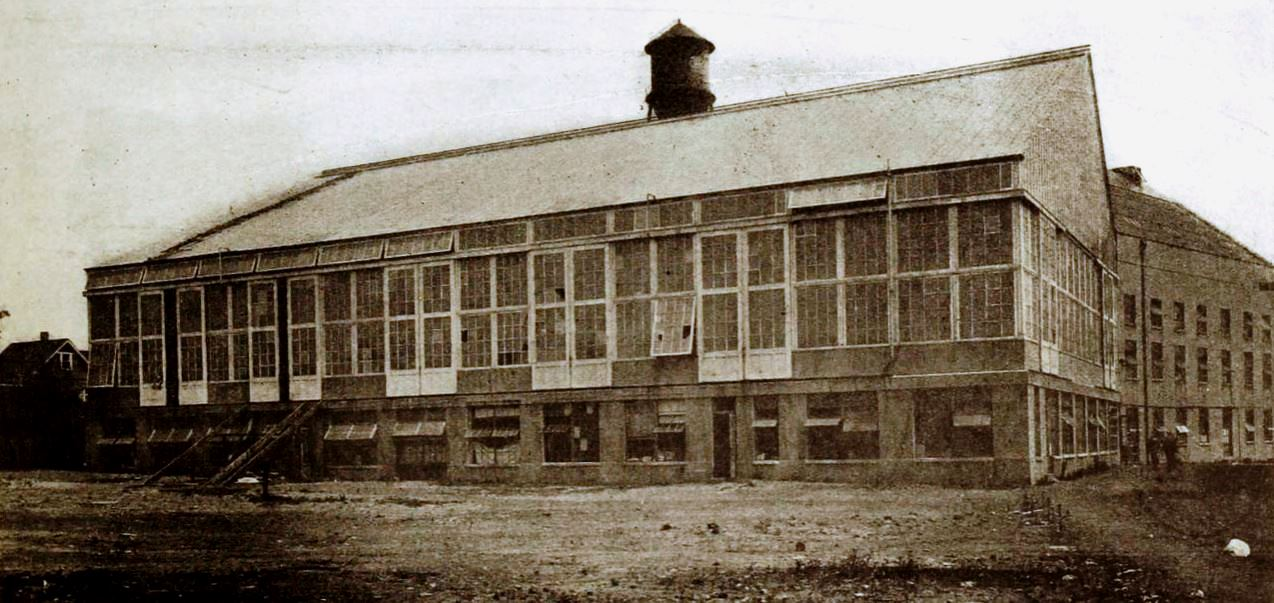
Rear view of the Selznick studio in Fort Lee, New Jersey, 1920.

Selznick Pictures was an American film production company active between 1916 and 1923 during the silent era.

== History ==
Selznick Pictures was founded in April 1916 by Lewis J. Selznick following his loss of control at World Film. Selznick moved production from his former base at Fort Lee, New Jersey to California, and brought with him Clara Kimball Young who had been World Film's biggest star.

In 1917 Adolph Zukor, head of Paramount Pictures, bought a half share in the company. Selznick remained as head of the studios, but films were now released under the label of Select Pictures. In April 1919 Selznick bought out Zukor's half share in the company for over $1 million. Selznick's sons David and Myron were both involved in the company.

In 1923 Select Pictures went out of business. Selznick Pictures continued to release pictures until the following year, including three British imports from Gainsborough Pictures. However the firm itself had run into financial difficulties, and the firm's remaining assets were purchased by Universal Pictures in late 1924. The bankrupt Selznick was briefly made head of production at Associated Exhibitors, but this company was soon merged. His son David later revived the family name with his own production company Selznick International Pictures.

== Filmography ==
=== 1910s ===
- War Brides (1916) – lost
- The Foolish Virgin (1916) – lost
- The Common Law (1916) – lost
- Vera, the Medium (1917) – lost
- Poppy (1917) – incomplete
- Scandal (1917) – lost
- Panthea (1917) – lost
- The Argyle Case (1917) – lost
- The Wild Girl (1917) – lost
- The Price She Paid (1917) – lost
- The Eternal Sin (1917) – lost
- The Easiest Way (1917) – lost
- The Law of Compensation (1917) – lost
- The Silent Master (1917) – lost
- The Lone Wolf (1917) – lost
- Public Be Damned (1917) – lost
- Over There (1917) – lost
- Magda (1917) – lost
- The Lesson (1917) – lost
- The Moth (1917) – lost
- Her Silent Sacrifice (1917) – lost
- The Secret of the Storm Country (1917) – lost
- The Honeymoon (1917) – lost
- Shirley Kaye (1917) – lost
- The Ghosts of Yesterday (1918) – lost
- The Marionettes (1918) – lost
- The Studio Girl (1918) – lost
- Woman and Wife (1918) – lost
- The House of Glass (1918) – lost
- The Knife (1918) – lost
- The Shuttle (1918) – lost
- By Right of Purchase (1918) – lost
- At the Mercy of Men (1918) – lost
- The Reason Why (1918) – lost
- Up the Road with Sallie (1918) – lost
- Cecilia of the Pink Roses (1918) – lost
- De Luxe Annie (1918) – lost
- The Ordeal of Rosetta (1918) – lost
- The Claw (1918) – lost
- Good Night, Paul (1918) – lost
- The Whirlpool (1918) – lost
- The Safety Curtain (1918) – lost
- A Pair of Silk Stockings (1918) – lost
- The Death Dance (1918) – lost
- Sauce for the Goose (1918) – lost
- The Savage Woman (1918) – lost
- Her Only Way (1918) – lost
- The Burden of Proof (1918) – lost
- The Better Half (1918) – lost
- The Forbidden City (1918) – lost
- Mrs. Leffingwell's Boots (1918) – lost
- The Woman the Germans Shot (1918) – lost
- Her Great Chance (1918) – lost
- The One Woman (1918) – lost
- The Road Through the Dark (1918) – lost
- A Lady's Name (1918) – lost
- In the Hollow of Her Hand (1918) – lost
- Code of the Yukon (1918) – lost
- The Midnight Patrol (1918) – lost
- The Heart of Wetona (1919) – lost
- The Hidden Truth (1919) – lost
- Who Cares? (1919) – lost
- Cheating Cheaters (1919) – lost
- The Indestructible Wife (1919) – lost
- Romance and Arabella (1919) – lost
- The World to Live In (1919) – lost
- Children of Banishment (1919) – lost
- Experimental Marriage (1919) – lost
- Marie, Ltd. (1919) – lost
- The Belle of New York (1919) – lost
- Bolshevism on Trial (1919) – extant
- Getting Mary Married (1919) – lost
- The Redhead (1919) – lost
- The New Moon (1919) – lost
- The Veiled Adventure (1919) – lost
- The Probation Wife (1919) – lost
- Break the News to Mother (1919) – lost
- Jacques of the Silver North (1919) – lost
- Happiness a la Mode (1919) – lost
- The Better Wife (1919) – lost
- His Bridal Night (1919) – lost
- The Way of a Woman (1919) – lost
- The Imp (1919) – lost
- Upstairs and Down (1919) – lost
- The Faith of the Strong (1919) – lost
- The Undercurrent (1919) – lost
- The Last of His People (1919) – lost
- The Perfect Lover (1919) – lost
- The Spite Bride (1919) – lost
- A Scream in the Night (1919) – lost
- The Glorious Lady (1919) – lost
- The Country Cousin (1919) – lost
- A Regular Girl (1919) – lost
- The Isle of Conquest (1919) – lost
- Sealed Hearts (1919) – incomplete
- Piccadilly Jim (1919) – lost
- Out Yonder (1919) – incomplete
- The Broken Melody (1919) – lost

=== 1920s ===
- Greater Than Fame (1920) – lost
- She Loves and Lies (1920) – lost
- Blind Youth (1920) – lost
- The Invisible Divorce (1920) – lost
- Just a Wife (1920) – lost
- Footlights and Shadows (1920) – lost
- His Wife's Money (1920) – lost
- Sooner or Later (1920) – lost
- Youthful Folly (1920) – lost
- A Fool and His Money (1920) – lost
- The Shadow of Rosalie Byrnes (1920) – lost
- The Woman God Sent (1920) – lost
- The Flapper (1920) – extant
- Whispers (1920) – lost
- Seeds of Vengeance (1920) – lost
- The Valley of Doubt (1920) – lost
- The Man Who Lost Himself (1920) – lost
- The Desperate Hero (1920) – lost
- The Figurehead (1920) – lost
- The Servant Question (1920) – lost
- The Branded Four (1920) – lost
- Out of the Snows (1920) – lost
- Marooned Hearts (1920) – lost
- The Greatest Love (1920) – lost
- Darling Mine (1920) – lost
- The Palace of Darkened Windows (1920) – lost
- The Poor Simp (1920) – lost
- The Point of View (1920) – lost
- The Wonderful Chance (1920) – extant
- Everybody's Sweetheart (1920) – lost
- The Dangerous Paradise (1920) – lost
- Red Foam (1920) – lost
- The Daughter Pays (1920) – lost
- The Sin That Was His (1920) – lost
- Broadway and Home (1920) – lost
- The Road of Ambition (1920) – lost
- The Pleasure Seekers (1920) – lost
- The Woman Game (1920) – lost
- The Great Shadow (1920) – lost
- Just Outside the Door (1921) – lost
- The Chicken in the Case (1921) – lost
- Worlds Apart (1921) – lost
- The Highest Law (1921) – lost
- Poor, Dear Margaret Kirby (1921) – lost
- Society Snobs (1921) – lost
- The Miracle of Manhattan (1921) – lost
- Bucking the Tiger (1921) – lost
- A Certain Rich Man (1921) – lost
- A Divorce of Convenience (1921) – lost
- The Girl from Nowhere (1921) – lost
- Is Life Worth Living? (1921) – extant
- The Fighter (1921) – lost
- Who Am I? (1921) – lost
- Remorseless Love (1921) – lost
- Handcuffs or Kisses (1921) – lost
- After Midnight (1921) – lost
- Clay Dollars (1921) – lost
- A Man of Stone (1921) – lost
- The Leech (1921) – lost
- The Way of a Maid (1921) – lost
- Chivalrous Charley (1921) – lost
- A Man's Home (1921) – lost
- Conceit (1921) – lost
- Gilded Lies (1921) – lost
- The Last Door (1921) – lost
- Shadows of the Sea (1922) – lost
- Why Announce Your Marriage? (1922) – lost
- The Prophet's Paradise (1922) – lost
- A Wide Open Town (1922) – lost
- Love Is an Awful Thing (1922) – lost
- Pawned (1922) – lost
- Love's Masquerade (1922) – lost
- Reported Missing (1922) – lost
- Channing of the Northwest (1922) – lost
- Reckless Youth (1922) – lost
- Evidence (1922) – lost
- The Referee (1922) – lost
- John Smith (1922) – lost
- One Week of Love (1922) – extant
- Under Oath (1922) – lost
- The Monkey's Paw (1923) – lost
- Broken Hearts of Broadway (1923) – lost
- Modern Matrimony (1923) – lost
- Sinner or Saint (1923) – lost
- Rupert of Hentzau (1923) – lost
- Toilers of the Sea (1923) – lost
- The Cricket on the Hearth (1923) – lost
- Wife in Name Only (1923) – lost
- Defying Destiny (1923) – lost
- Cause for Divorce (1923) – lost
- A Prince of a King (1923) – lost
- Broadway Broke (1923) – lost
- Bag and Baggage (1923) – lost
- The Common Law (1923) – lost
- Roulette (1924) – lost
- The Bowery Bishop (1924) – lost
- The Right of the Strongest (1924) – lost
- Daughters of Today (1924) – lost
- Pagan Passions (1924) – lost
- Love of Women (1924) – lost
- Missing Daughters (1924) – lost
- Flapper Wives (1924) – lost
- Twenty Dollars a Week (1924) – lost

== Bibliography ==
- Slide, Anthony. The New Historical Dictionary of the American Film Industry. Routledge, 2014.
