= Myton =

Myton may refer to:

== Places ==
- Myton, Hull, originally a separate village and once a parish in Kingston-Upon-Hull
- Myton, Utah, city in Duchesne County, Utah, United States
- Myton-on-Swale, a village in North Yorkshire
- Myton, Warwickshire, a suburb of Warwick
- Myton, town centre of Ingleby Barwick, North Yorkshire

== Other uses ==
- Myton in Greek mythology, demigod son of Poseidon by Mytilene, daughter of Macareus.
- Myton (surname)

== See also ==
- Mitton (disambiguation)
- Battle of Myton (1319), in North Yorkshire
- Myton School, a school in Warwickshire
- Mytton (disambiguation)
