= Broadway Lady =

1925 film

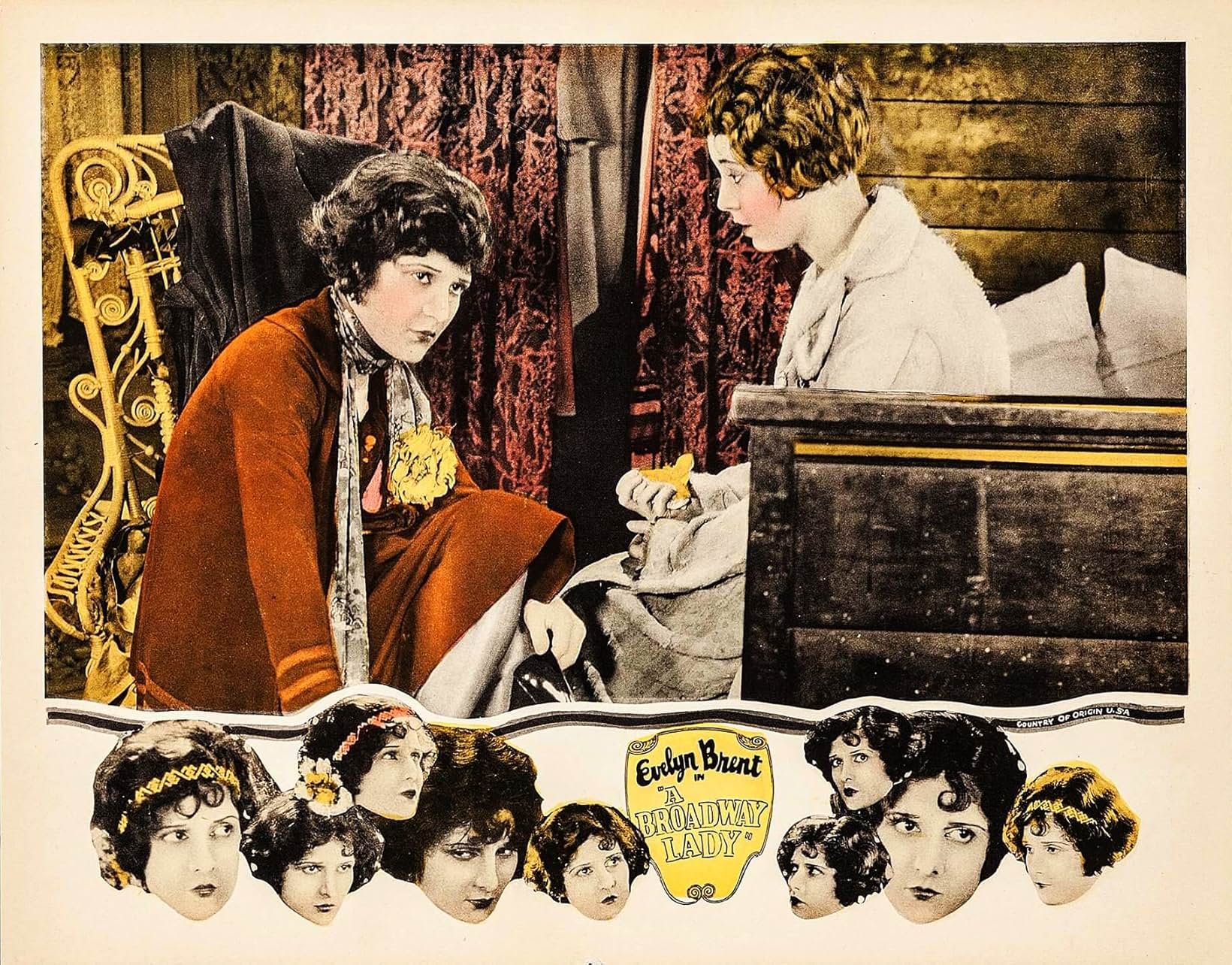
- Lobby card
- Directed by: Wesley Ruggles
- Written by: Fred Myton
- Starring: Evelyn Brent
- Production company: Robertson-Cole Pictures Corporation
- Distributed by: Film Booking Offices of America
- Release date: November 15, 1925
- Running time: 6 reels
- Country: United States
- Language: Silent (English intertitles)

Broadway Lady is a 1925 American silent drama film directed by Wesley Ruggles and starring Evelyn Brent.

== Plot ==
As described in a review in a film magazine, Evelyn, a chorus girl, is admired by a young blue-blood whose family invites her to a reception to show her up. To teach them a lesson for their snobbery, she marries this chap. Bob. His sister becomes infatuated with Martyn, a libertine, and to save her when she prepares to elope, Evelyn goes to Martyn's apartment. He is shot and Evelyn is captured and accused of the crime. It is revealed that Mary, a girl Evelyn had befriended, had a row with Martyn, and the shooting was accidental. Both young women are freed and Bob's family is glad to receive Evelyn as a member of the household.

== Cast ==
- Evelyn Brent as Rosalie Ryan
- Marjorie Bonner as Mary Andrews
- Theodore von Eltz as Bob Westbrook
- Joyce Compton as Phyllis Westbrook
- Clarissa Selwynne as Mrs. Westbrook
- Ernest Hilliard as Martyn Edwards
- John Gough as Johnny (credited as Johnny Gough)
- Miki Morita

== Preservation ==
A print of Broadway Lady is located in the archive of the Library of Congress.
