= Tim Reagan =

Tim or Timothy Reagan or Regan may refer to:

- Timothy G. Reagan (born 1956), educator
- Tim Reagan, character in Alias Mary Flynn
- Tim Regan (born 1981), soccer player
- Timothy Regan (racehorse trainer), see King Edward Stakes
- Tim Regan (ice hockey) (born 1949), American former ice hockey goaltender
