= Jason Forbes (disambiguation) =

Jason Forbes is a British actor and comedian.

Jason Forbes may also refer to:

- Jason Forbes, character in Alias Mary Flynn
- Jason Forbes, character in The Bill (series 23)
