= Smooth as Satin =

1925 film

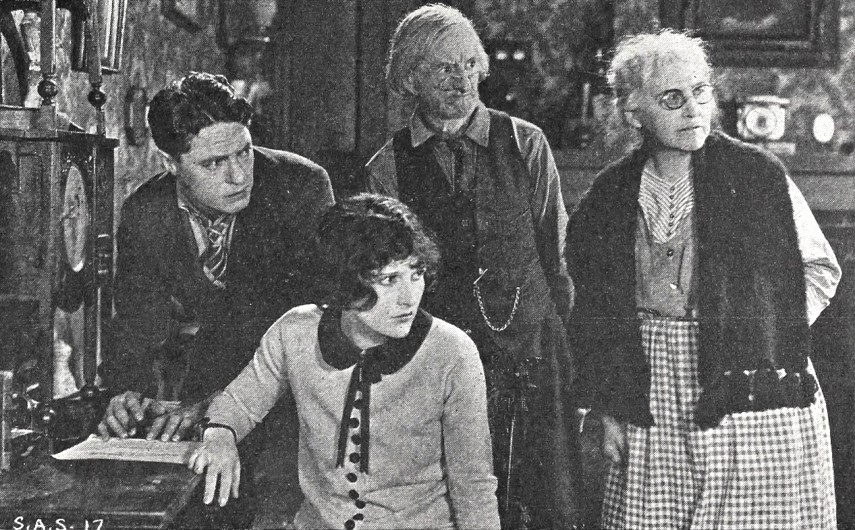
- Film still
- Directed by: Ralph Ince
- Written by: Fred Myton; Bayard Veiller (play)
- Starring: Evelyn Brent
- Cinematography: Silvano Balboni
- Production company: Robertson-Cole Pictures Corporation
- Distributed by: Film Booking Offices of America (FBO)
- Release date: June 14, 1925
- Running time: 60 minutes; 6 reels
- Country: United States
- Language: Silent (English intertitles)

Smooth as Satin is a 1925 American silent drama film based upon the stage play, The Chatterbox, by Bayard Veiller. It was directed by Ralph Ince and stars Evelyn Brent. The film was remade in 1930, entitled Alias French Gertie.

== Plot ==
As described in a film magazine review, Gertie Jones, known as the "perfect maid," finds herself unable to open her mistress' safe and finds Jimmy Hartigan is also in the house after the necklace. Police enter and Hartigan prevents the young woman from being arrested by sacrificing his own freedom. While in the penitentiary he marries Gertie. They decide to take the loot they have and invest it in business, but their friends scam them. To get their money back, they hold up the couple on the road. They are caught by the police, but are saved by Chicago Red, who has something on the detective. Gertie and Jimmy decide to return to the straight and narrow.

== Cast ==
- Evelyn Brent as Gertie Jones
- Bruce Gordon as Jimmy Hartigan
- Fred Kelsey as Kersey
- Fred Esmelton as Bill Munson
- Mabel Van Buren as Mrs. Munson
- John Gough as Henderson

== Preservation ==
With no prints of Smooth as Satin located in any film archives, it is a lost film.
