= Queen o'Diamonds =

1926 film

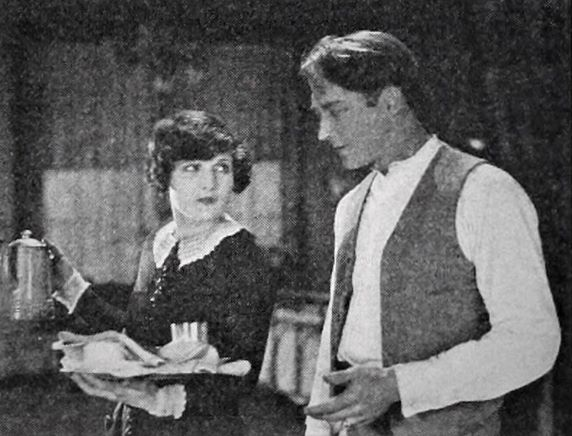
- Still with Evelyn Brent and Theodore von Eltz
- Directed by: Chester Withey
- Written by: Fred Myton
- Starring: Evelyn Brent; Elsa Lorimer; Phillips Smalley
- Cinematography: Roy H. Klaffki
- Production company: Robertson-Cole Pictures Corporation
- Distributed by: Film Booking Offices of America
- Release date: January 24, 1926
- Running time: 60 min.
- Country: United States
- Language: Silent (English intertitles)

Queen o'Diamonds is a 1926 American silent drama film directed by Chester Withey and starring Evelyn Brent, Elsa Lorimer, and Phillips Smalley.

== Plot ==
As described in a film magazine review, chorus girl Jerry Lyon resembles Jeanette Durant, a Broadway star whose husband is an international crook. Jerry, in love with struggling playwright Daniel Hammon, is induced to pose as Jeanette. She becomes involved in a series of wild adventures in which she innocently comes into possession of some stolen diamonds. She meets Ramsey, a theatrical producer, who agrees to star Jerry in Daniel's play, after she has brought the police in time to arrest a gang of desperate criminals.

== Cast ==
- Evelyn Brent as Jeanette Durant / Jerry Lyon
- Elsa Lorimer as Mrs. Ramsey
- Phillips Smalley as Mr. Ramsey
- William Bailey as LeRoy Phillips
- Theodore von Eltz as Daniel Hammon
- Edward Peil as Crook

== Bibliography ==
- Munden, Kenneth White. The American Film Institute Catalog of Motion Pictures Produced in the United States, Part 1. University of California Press, 1997.
