= Myton (surname) =

Myton is a surname. Notable people with the surname include:

- Cedric Myton (born 1947), Jamaican musician
- Fred Myton (1885–1955), American screenwriter
- Neville Myton (1946–2021), Jamaican middle-distance runner

== See also ==
- Maton (surname)
