= Silk Stocking Sal =

1924 film

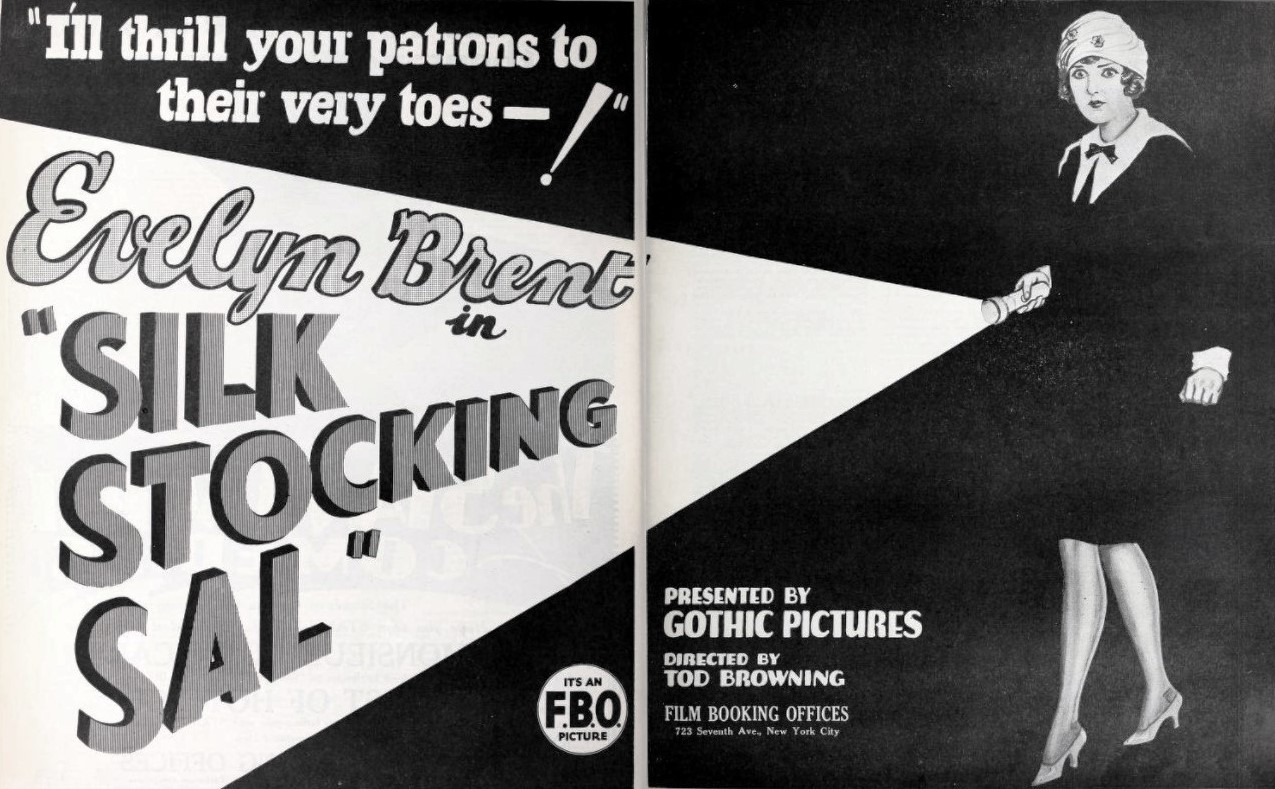
- Advertisement
- Directed by: Tod Browning
- Written by: Richard Schayer
- Starring: Evelyn Brent; Robert Ellis
- Cinematography: Silvano Balboni
- Production company: Gothic Pictures
- Distributed by: Film Booking Offices of America (FBO)
- Release date: November 30, 1924
- Running time: 5 reels
- Country: United States
- Language: Silent (English intertitles)

Silk Stocking Sal is a 1924 American drama film directed by Tod Browning and starring Evelyn Brent.

== Plot ==
As described in a review in a film magazine, member of an underworld gang Sal (Brent), while robbing a safe in a house, is surprised by the owner Bob Cooper (Ellis), who falls for her story and gives her enough money to go straight. She laughs at him, but her mother's sympathy makes an impression on her so she takes a job at Bob's office. Bob's partner is murdered, and Bob is convicted and sentenced, based upon circumstantial evidence, to death in the electric chair. Sal is so sure that Bull Reagan (Metcalfe), leader of a gang, is the murderer that she rejoins the gang. At the last minute, she taunts a confession out of him. Bob is saved and finds happiness with Sal.

== Cast ==
- Evelyn Brent as 'Stormy' Martin / Silk Stocking Sal
- Robert Ellis as Bob Cooper
- Earl Metcalfe as Bull Reagan
- Alice Wilson as Bargain Basement Annie (credited as Alice Browning)
- Virginia Madison as Mrs. Cooper
- Marylynn Warner as Miss Cooper
- John Gough as The 'Gopher'
- Louis Fitzroy as Abner Bingham

== Promotion ==
A theater in Waterloo, Iowa, reportedly handed out a pair of silk stockings as a promotion to viewers.

== Production ==
With no prints of Silk Stocking Sal located in any film archives, it, as with most FBO films of the mid-1920s, is a lost film.
