= The Dangerous Flirt =

1924 film

- Directed by: Tod Browning
- Written by: Richard Schayer
- Based on: "The Prude" by Julie Herne
- Produced by: Gothic Pictures
- Starring: Evelyn Brent; Edward Earle
- Cinematography: Lucien Andriot; Maynard Rugg
- Production company: Gothic Pictures
- Distributed by: Film Booking Offices of America
- Release date: October 19, 1924
- Running time: 6 reels 1,614 meters (5,297.014 feet)
- Country: United States
- Language: Silent (English intertitles)

The Dangerous Flirt (also released as A Dangerous Flirtation) is a 1924 American melodrama directed by Tod Browning and starring Evelyn Brent and Edward Earle.

== Plot ==
As described in a review in a film magazine, Sheila Fairfax (Brent), reared by a puritanical aunt, is stupidly old-fashioned. Captain Ramon Jose (Gendron) inveigles her into becoming engaged to him but she breaks it. Dick Morris (Earle), a mining engineer, gallantly whisks her away and they are married. Sheila's puritanical training makes her an easy prey to fears on her wedding night. Dick misunderstands her timidity for disgust and leaves her. She follows him to South America and they become the guests of Don Alfonso, uncle of Ramon Jose. The Don and Jose vie for her regard and in a fight Jose is killed by his uncle. Dick faces a firing squad under the Don's orders but Sheila saves him by a ruse and they escape, happily reunited.

== Cast ==
- Evelyn Brent as Sheila Fairfax
- Edward Earle as Dick Morris
- Sheldon Lewis as Don Alfonso
- Clarissa Selwynne as Aunt Prissy
- Pierre Gendron as Captain Jose Gonzales

== Production ==
With no prints of The Dangerous Flirt located in any film archives, it is a lost film.

== See also ==
- List of lost films
