= Forbidden Cargo =

Forbidden Cargo may refer to:

- Forbidden Cargo (1925 film), an American film starring Boris Karloff: rum-running from Bahamas to United States
- Forbidden Cargo (1954 film), a British film starring Jack Warner: customs officer and birdwatcher tackle drug smugglers

== See also ==
- Forbidden Cargoes, a 1925 British film starring Clifford McLaglen
