= Midnight Molly =

1925 film

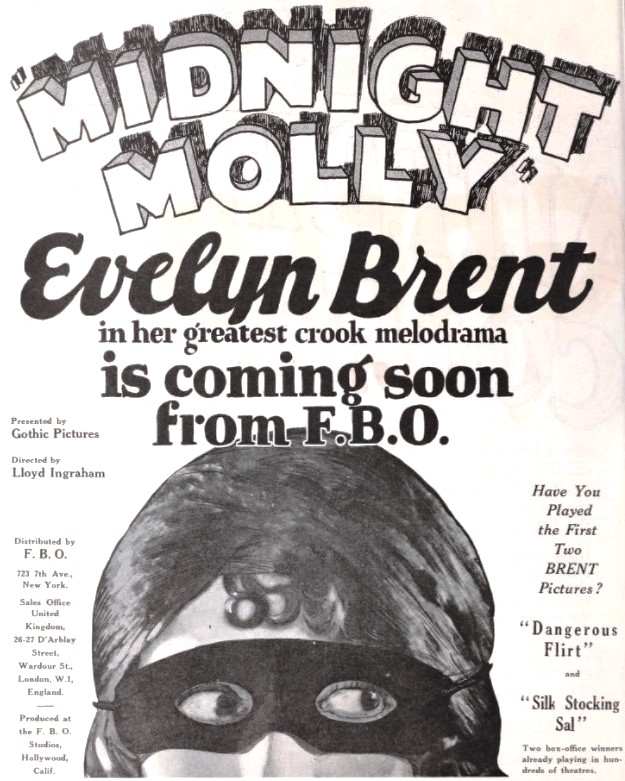
- Advertisement
- Directed by: Lloyd Ingraham
- Written by: Fred Myton
- Starring: Evelyn Brent
- Cinematography: Silvano Balboni
- Production company: Gothic Pictures
- Distributed by: Film Booking Offices of America
- Release date: January 11, 1925
- Running time: 50 minutes
- Country: United States
- Language: Silent (English intertitles)

Midnight Molly is a 1925 American silent drama film directed by Lloyd Ingraham and starring Evelyn Brent in a dual role. A print of the film exists in the BFI National Archive.

== Plot ==
As described in a review in a film magazine, Midnight Molly, surprised by detectives as she is stealing a painting, escapes but is run down by an automobile and is taken to the hospital. Margaret, wife of District Attorney John Warren, elopes with adventurer George Calvin. John is called to the hospital and finds that Molly is the double of his wife. Hoping to avert a scandal, he takes her home. Molly recovers and keeps up the deception. John runs for governor. Calvin hears of this and, seeing a chance for blackmail, returns. Detective Daley is suspicious of Molly and hopes to trap her by taking her fingerprints. However, Daley's stool pigeon squeals on his plans. Molly goes to Margaret and forces her to come to the Warren house and be fingerprinted, saving the situation. Margaret and Calvin are later killed, and John and Molly are married.

== Cast ==
- Evelyn Brent as Margaret Warren / Midnight Molly
- John T. Dillon as Daley (credited as John Dillon)
- Bruce Gordon as John Warren
- Léon Bary as George Calvin (as Leon Barry)
- John Gough as Fogarty
