= Mitton =

Mitton may refer to:

- Mitton (surname)
- Great Mitton (village and civil parish) and Little Mitton (civil parish), in Lancashire, England
- Lower Mitton and Upper Mitton, former hamlets in Worcestershire, now parts of Stourport-on-Severn
- 4027 Mitton, an asteroid

== See also ==
- Myton (disambiguation)
