= Evelyn Brent =

American actress (1895–1975)

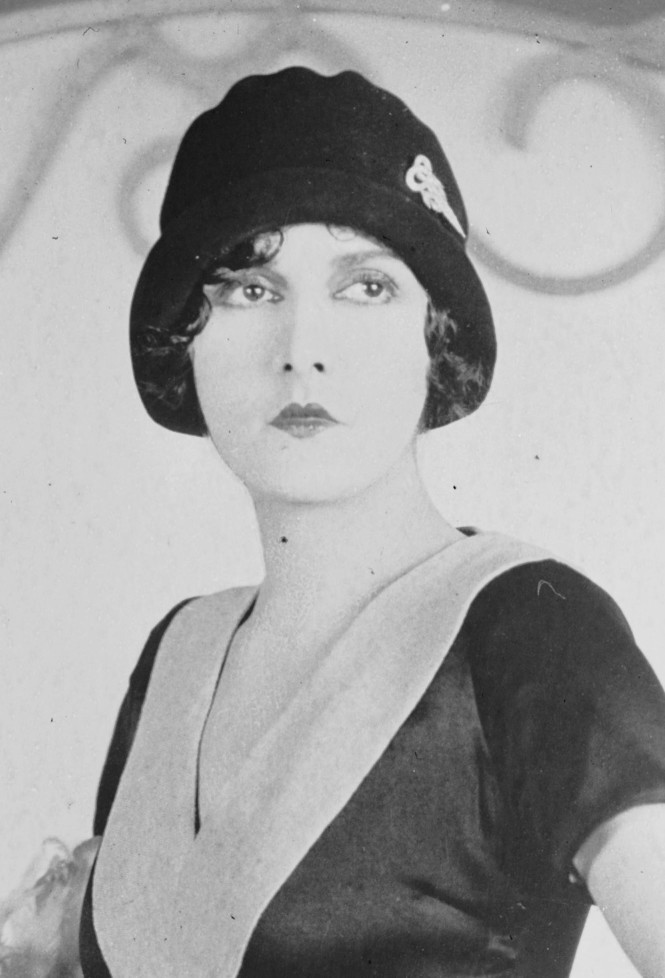
- Brent photographed in 1929 by Russell Ball
- Born: Mary Elizabeth Riggs; October 20, 1895; Tampa, Florida, U.S.
- Died: June 4, 1975 (aged 79); Los Angeles, California, U.S.
- Other name: Betty Riggs
- Occupation: Actress
- Years active: 1915–1960
- Spouses: B. P. Fineman (m. 1922; div. 1927) Harry D. Edwards (m. 1928; div. 1947) Harry Fox (m. 1948; died 1959)

Evelyn Brent (born Mary Elizabeth Riggs; October 20, 1895 – June 4, 1975) was an American film and stage actress known as Lady Crook and for playing the "bad girl" in early Hollywood thrillers.

== Early life ==
Brent was born Mary Elizabeth Riggs, known as Betty, to Eleanor Warner Riggs and Arthur Riggs. Brent claimed to be born in Tampa, Florida, to parents who were teenagers of only 13 and 17 respectively, stating in a 1929 interview that:

"Of such a violent young love match did I come into existence. My mother was an Italian... indescribably beautiful, with long straight black hair, a white, haunting face. Eyes that told strange things. I knew they were strange even when I was a child. My father was — just an American."

The details of Brent's youth are unclear, as according to some sources her father died when Brent was only four years old, in others when Brent was ten years old, in a racing track accident, and others still it was her mother who died first when she was when she was 10, leaving her father to raise her alone. In any case, it seems that Brent was orphaned at a young age, and lived in New York State as a teenager, when her looks attracted modelling jobs that led to opportunities in the movie business.

== Career ==
Evelyn began her film career working as an extra under her own name at New Jersey film studio Fort Lee Studios, appearing in films such as A Man from Mars, A Gentleman From Mississippi and Maurice Tourneur'sThe Pit (1914) for New Jersey's Éclair studio, before her major debut in the 1915 silent film production of Robert W. Service' poem "The Shooting of Dan McGrew".

Brent became a protégé of Olga Petrova who was an influence on Brent's independent-minded attitude and preference for darker vampish movie roles. Brent appeared alongside Petrova in pioneering female filmmaker Alice Guy-Blaché's The Heart of a Painted Woman (1915). Brent was first credited under her stage name Evelyn Brent in The Lure of Heart's Desire (1916) for Metro Pictures in the role of Little Snowbird, alongside Edmund Breese.

Brent took up with a string of young actresses like herself, living together in furnished rooms around New York which she financed with her salary in studio stock companies. Such romantic friendships were interspersed with dramatic suicide attempts, which became a recurring pattern throughout her life.

Around this time Brent's roles as a pretty young ingenue in films such as 1916's The Spell of the Yukon and Playing With Fire were promoted in the press, where it was reported that if the US joined WWI she would "don male attire and enlist as a soldier":

"What the United States really will need will be people who know how to shoot. And I know how to shoot. I am young. I am strong. Therefore, why should I not be able to fight as well as a man?"

After World War I, she traveled to Europe and settled briefly in London, England. She had a role in The Ruined Lady, alongside co-stars C. Aubrey Smith and Nigel Bruce, credited as Evelyn Brent.

Brent remained in England for four-five years, performing on stage and in films, then she moved to Hollywood in 1922 in the same year of her first marriage, to Bernhard Powell Fineman, who would become go on to become head of FBO (Film Booking Office) Pictures in 1924, and later an assistant to Paramount's head of production.

1923 saw Brent's career receive a major boost when she was chosen as one of the WAMPAS Baby Stars. Douglas Fairbanks Sr. signed her as his leading lady for a film that was abandoned and his next films, The Thief of Bagdad and The Black Pirate, were unsuitable for her. When the press attempted to create a scandal that Fairbanks was cheating on his wife Mary Pickford with her, Brent left his company to join Associated Authors.

After a year-long contract that resulted mostly in minor westerns and melodramas, Evelyn signed with Film Booking Office (FBO), which immediately launched her as the "Queen of the Underworld" with a series of crook dramas including Silk Stocking Sal (directed by the master of macabre, Tod Browning), Midnight Molly, Alias Mary Flynn, Smooth as Satin, Lady Robinhood, and Queen o'Diamonds. The minor stardom that Evelyn received from these popular films brought her to the attention of Paramount Pictures, which signed her to a long-term contract.

Around this time she was quoted in the Los Angeles Times in relation to her preference for playing in thrillers:

“These drawing-room pictures in which you have to play the part of an animated clothes-horse give me a pain. They give you no chance whatever to develop individuality or character.”

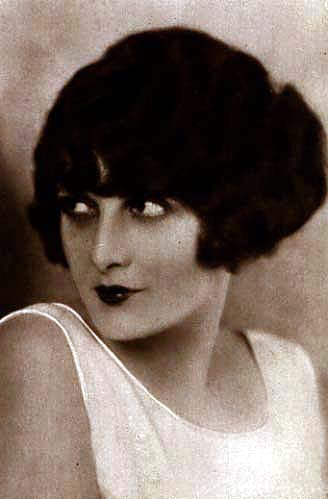
Mid-1920s promotional image issued by Film Booking Offices, later acquired by RKO

Paramount launched her tenure at the company with the lead in the popular shopgirl comedy Love 'Em and Leave 'Em, where her screen impact overshadowed by the appearance of Louise Brooks as Brent's younger sister.

Josef Von Sternberg, an acquaintance from her time in British films and a fan of her FBO series of crook pictures, cast her as Feathers (over the objections of Paramount executives, who preferred Estelle Taylor for the role) in the gangster epic Underworld (1927) which became her real break in Hollywood.

Brent appeared in Von Sternberg's The Last Command (1928), an epic drama starring Emil Jannings and William Powell. Von Sternberg worked with her for the third and last time in The Drag Net (1928), which reunited her with her Underworld co-star George Bancroft.

In-between and after her series of films with Von Sternberg, Paramount cast Brent in a string of pictures that sustained her popularity, including a sequel to 1926's hit Beau Geste called Beau Sabreur, the melodrama His Tiger Wife, and her last silent film The Mating Call for director James Cruze.

Brent was cast as the female lead in Paramount's first all-talking picture Interference. She was loaned to Universal Pictures for the musical-drama Broadway, which ran for two years. Her Paramount contract had about a year left to run, and she appeared in Paramount on Parade.

Brent played major roles in several features, most notably The Silver Horde.

By the early part of the 1930s, she was working in secondary roles in a variety of films as well as touring with vaudeville shows. In 1936, she played William Boyd's love interest/femme fatale in Hopalong Cassidy Returns. However, by 1941, she was no longer in demand by major studios, and she found work at smaller, low-budget studios.

Evelyn Brent photographed attractively with leading men who were at advanced ages and later stages in their careers: Jack Holt in the Columbia serial Holt of the Secret Service, Neil Hamilton in PRC's production Dangerous Lady, and Lee Tracy in the same studio's The Payoff. In the early 1940s, she worked in action features for Paramount, produced by Pine-Thomas Productions. VDirector William Beaudine cast her in many productions, including Emergency Landing (1941), Bowery Champs (1944), The Golden Eye (1948), and Again Pioneers (1950). After performing in more than 120 films, she retired from acting in 1950 and worked for a number of years as an actor's agent.

She returned to acting in television's Wagon Train 1960 S3 E14 "The Lita Foladaire Story". Brent played the housekeeper Mrs. Simmons, and her appearance had changed radically.

== Personal life and death ==
Evelyn Brent was married three times: to movie executive Bernard P. Fineman, to producer Harry D. Edwards, and to the vaudeville actor Harry Fox. Fox and she were married until he died in 1959. Brent was bisexual and also lived with romantic female partners throughout her life, including Hollywood gossip columnist and writer of scandalous potboilers Dorothy Ducas Herzog.

Brent died of a heart attack in 1975 at age 79 in her Los Angeles home. She is interred in the San Fernando Mission Cemetery in Mission Hills, California.

== Legacy ==
In 1960, Brent was inducted into the Hollywood Walk of Fame with a motion pictures star for her contributions to the film industry. Her star is located at 6548 Hollywood Boulevard.

== Filmography ==
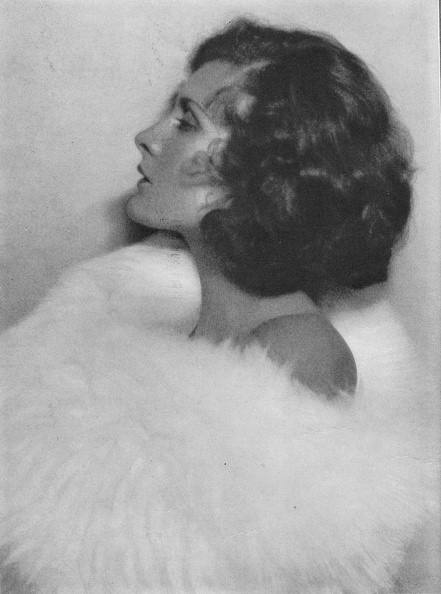
Evelyn Brent in 1929

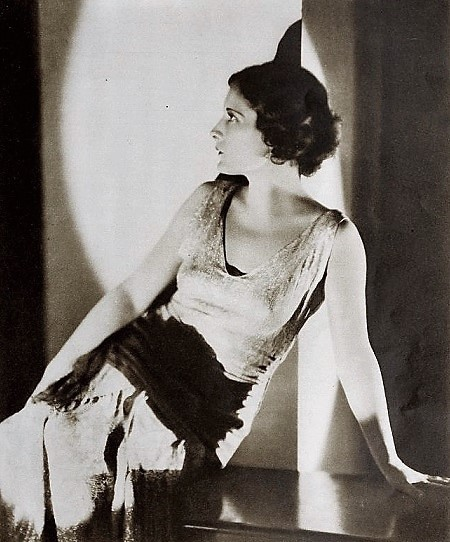
Evelyn Brent in 1931

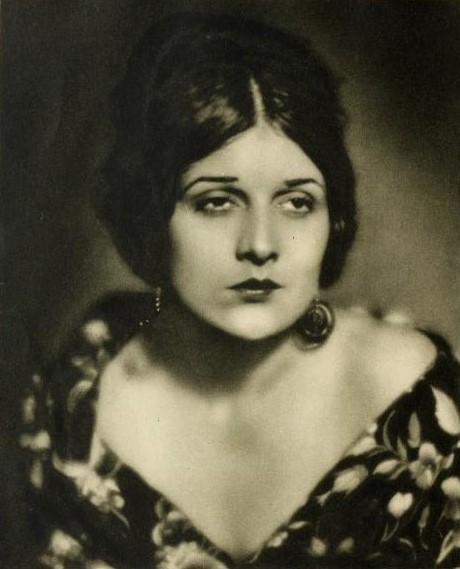
Evelyn Brent in Stars of the Photoplay

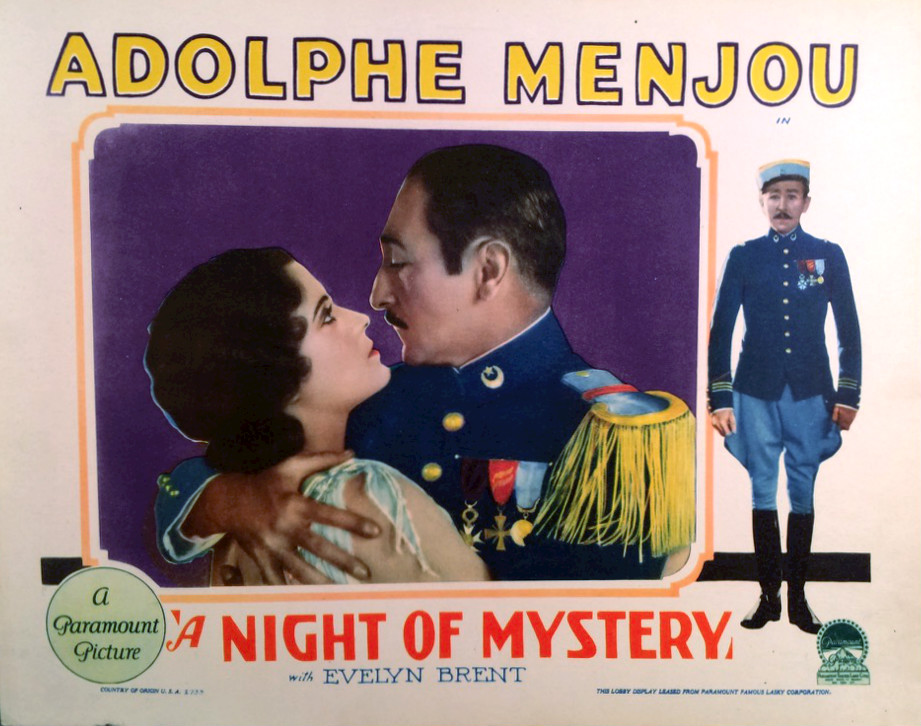
Lobby card for A Night of Mystery (1928)

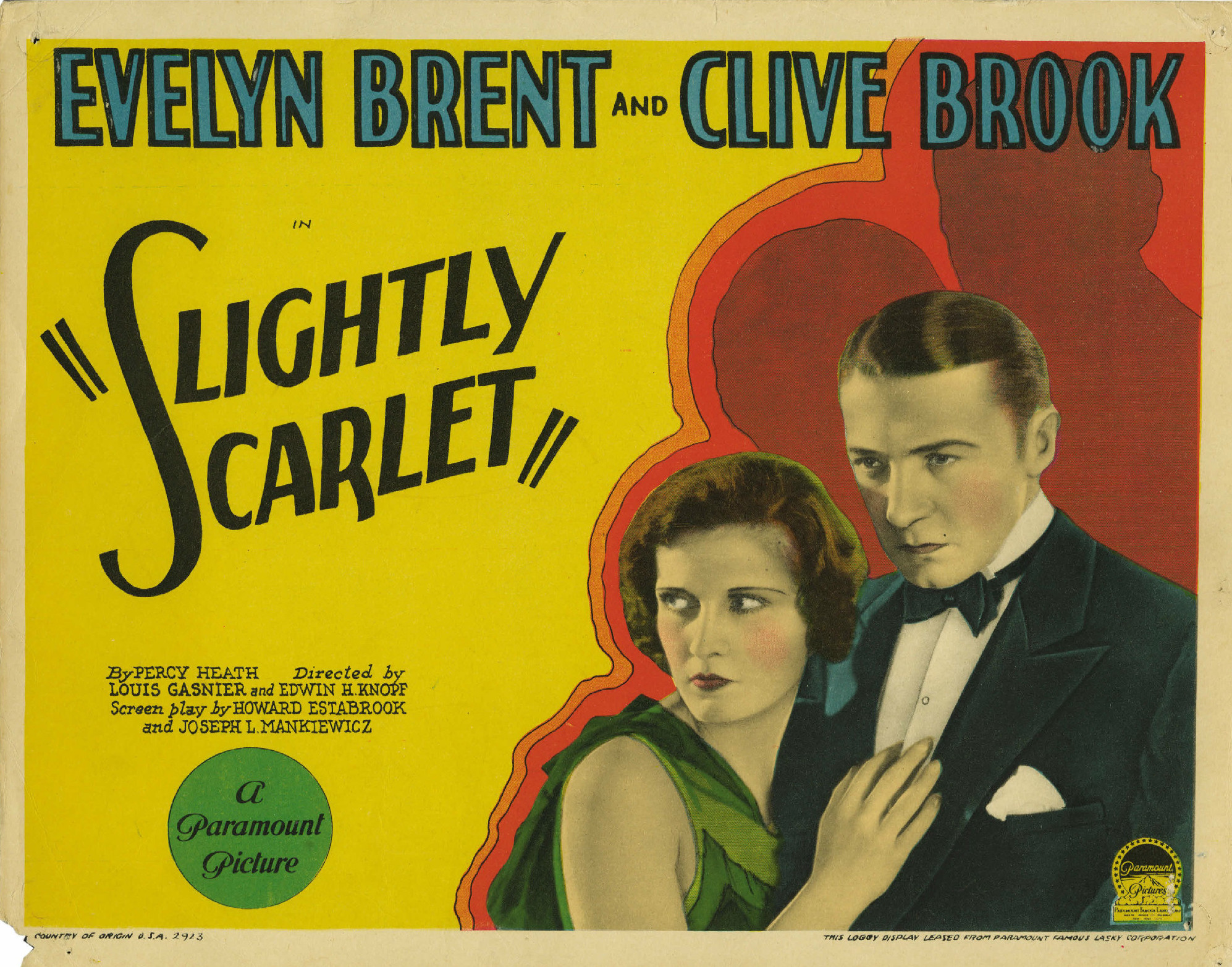
Lobby card for Slightly Scarlet (1930)

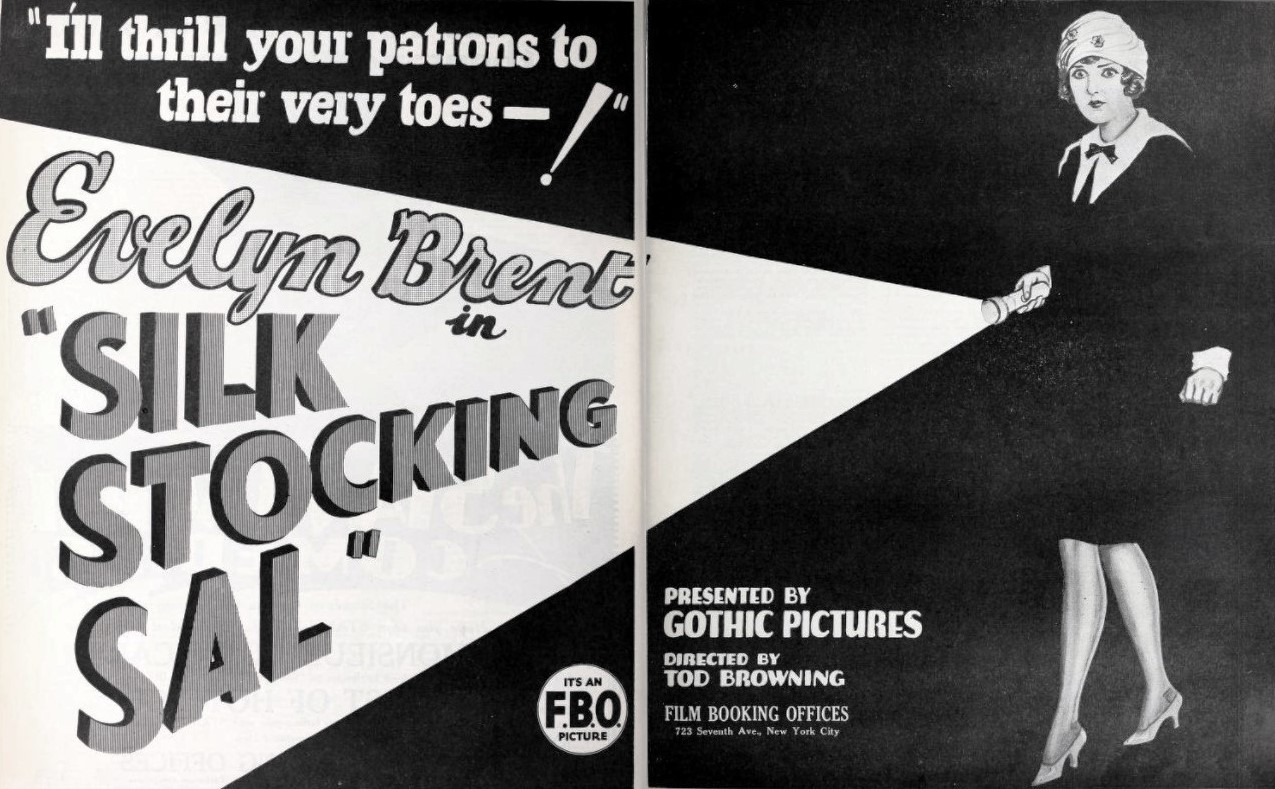
Magazine ad for Silk Stocking Sal (1924)

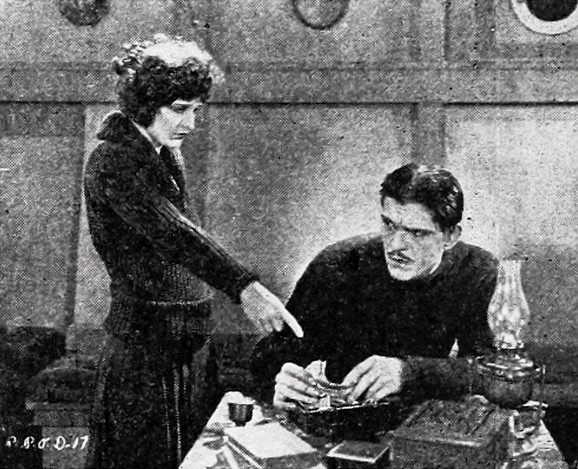
With Boris Karloff in Forbidden Cargo (1925)

=== Silent features ===
Year	Title	Role	Notes
1914	A Gentleman from Mississippi	Hope Langdon	Lost film
1915	The Heart of a Painted Woman		Lost film
1915	The Shooting of Dan McGrew	Nell (adult)	Lost film Credited as Betty Riggs
1915	When Love Laughs	Bessie	Lost film Short film
1916	The Lure of Heart's Desire	Little Snowbird	Lost film
1916	The Iron Will		Lost film Short film Uncredited
1916	The Soul Market	Vivian Austin	Lost film
1916	Playing with Fire	Lucille Vane	Lost film
1916	The Spell of the Yukon	Dorothy Temple	Lost film
1916	The Weakness of Strength	Bessie Alden	Lost film
1916	The Iron Woman	Nannie Maitland	Lost film
1917	The Millionaire's Double	Constance Brent	Lost film
1917	To the Death	Rosa	Lost film
1917	Who's Your Neighbor?	Betty Hamlin	Lost film
1917	Raffles, the Amateur Cracksman	Ethel - Lord Amersteth's Daughter	
1918	Daybreak	Det. Alma Peterson	Lost film
1919	Border River	Marie Dubuque	Short film
1919	Help! Help! Police!	Marian Trevor	Lost film
1919	Fool's Gold	Nancy Smith	
1919	The Other Man's Wife	Becky Simon	Lost film
1919	The Glorious Lady	Lady Eileen	
1920	The Shuttle of Life	Miriam Grey	Lost film
1920	The Law Divine	Daphne Grey	Lost film
1921	Demos	Emma Vine	Lost film
1921	The Door That Has No Key	Violet Melton	Lost film
1921	Sybil	Sybil Gerard	Lost film
1921	Sonia	Sonia Dainton	Lost film
1921	Laughter and Tears	Pierette	
1922	Trapped by the Mormons	Nora Prescott	
1922	The Spanish Jade	Mañuela	Lost film
1922	Married to a Mormon	Beryl Fane	Lost film
1922	The Experiment	Doris Fielding	Lost film
1922	Pages of Life	Mitzi / Dolores	Lost film
1923	Held to Answer	Bessie Burbeck	Lost film
1924	Loving Lies	Ellen Craig	Lost film
1924	The Shadow of the Desert	Lolaire	Lost film
1924	Arizona Express	Lola Nichols	
1924	The Plunderer	The Lily	Lost film
1924	The Lone Chance	Margaret West	Lost film
1924	The Desert Outlaw	May Halloway	
1924	The Cyclone Rider	Weeping Wanda	
1924	The Dangerous Flirt	Sheila Fairfax	Lost film
1924	My Husband's Wives	Marie Wynn	Lost film
1924	Silk Stocking Sal	'Stormy' Martin	Lost film
1925	Midnight Molly	Margaret Warren / Midnight Molly	
1925	Forbidden Cargo	Polly O'Day	Lost film
1925	Alias Mary Flynn	Mary Flynn	Lost film
1925	Smooth as Satin	Gertie Jones	Lost film
1925	Lady Robinhood	Señorita Catalina / La Ortiga	Lost film Trailer survives
1925	Three Wise Crooks	Molly	Lost film
1925	Broadway Lady	Rosalie Ryan	
1926	Queen o'Diamonds	Jeanette Durant / Jerry Lyon	Lost film
1926	Secret Orders	Janet Graaham	Lost film
1926	The Impostor	Judith Gilbert	Lost film
1926	The Jade Cup	Peggy Allen	Lost film
1926	Flame of the Argentine	Inez Remírez	Lost film
1926	Love 'Em and Leave 'Em	Mame Walsh	
1927	Love's Greatest Mistake	Jane	Lost film
1927	Blind Alleys	Sally Ray	Lost film
1927	Underworld	'Feathers' McCoy	
1927	Women's Wares	Dolly Morton	
1928	Beau Sabreur	Mary Vanbrugh	Lost film
1928	The Last Command	Natalie Dabrova	
1928	The Showdown	Sibyl Shelton	
1928	A Night of Mystery	Gilberte Boismartel	Lost film
1928	His Tiger Lady	Tiger Lady	Lost film
1928	The Drag Net	The Magpie	Lost film
1928	The Mating Call	Rose Henderson	

== Sound features ==
Year	Title	Role	Notes
1928	Interference	Deborah Kane	
1929	Broadway	Pearl	Released as both silent and talking versions; Talking version is incomplete
1929	Fast Company	Evelyn Corey	An incomplete copy is held at the UCLA Film and Television Archive
1929	Woman Trap	Kitty Evans	
1929	Why Bring That Up?	Betty	
1929	Darkened Rooms	Ellen	
1930	Slightly Scarlet	Lucy Stavrin	
1930	Framed	Rose Manning	
1930	Paramount on Parade	Episode 'Origin of the Apache'	
1930	The Silver Horde	Cherry Malotte	
1930	Madonna of the Streets	May	
1931	Traveling Husbands	Ruby Smith	
1931	The Pagan Lady	Dorothy 'Dot' Hunter	
1931	The Mad Parade	Monica Dale	
1932	High Pressure	Francine Dale	
1932	Attorney for the Defense	Val Lorraine	
1932	The Crusader	Tess Brandon	
1933	The World Gone Mad	Carlotta Lamont	
1935	Symphony of Living	Paula Greig Rupert	
1935	Home on the Range	Georgia	
1935	Without Children	Shirley Ross Cole	
1935	The Nitwits	Mrs. Alice Lake	
1935	Speed Limited	Natalie	
1936	Song of the Trail	Myra	
1936	It Couldn't Have Happened - But It Did	Beverly Drake	
1936	The President's Mystery	Ilka Blake	
1936	Hopalong Cassidy Returns	Lilli Marsh	
1937	Jungle Jim	Shanghai Lil, one of four main characters	Serial
1937	King of Gamblers	Cora	
1937	The Last Train from Madrid	Soldier	uncredited
1937	Night Club Scandal	Julia Reed	
1937	Sudden Bill Dorn	Diana Viargas	
1937	Daughter of Shanghai	Olga Derey	
1938	Tip-Off Girls	Rena Terry	
1938	Mr. Wong, Detective	Olga aka Countess Dubois	
1938	The Law West of Tombstone	Clara 'Clary' Martinez	
1939	Panama Lady	Lenore	
1939	Daughter of the Tong	Carney-The Illustrious One	
1939	The Mad Empress	Empress Eugenie	
1941	Emergency Landing	Maude Lambert	
1941	Forced Landing	Doctor Vidalek's Housekeeper	
1941	Wide Open Town	Belle Langtry	
1941	Dangerous Lady	Hester Engle	
1941	Ellery Queen and the Murder Ring	Nurse holding microscope	uncredited
1941	Holt of the Secret Service	Kay Drew	
1942	Westward Ho	Mrs. Healey	
1942	Wrecking Crew	Martha Poska	
1942	The Payoff	Alma Dorn	
1942	Silent Witness	Mrs. Roos / Anna Barnes	
1943	Spy Train	Frieda Molte	
1943	The Seventh Victim	Natalie Cortez	
1944	Bowery Champs	Gypsy Carmen	
1947	Raiders of the South	Belle Chambers	
1947	Robin Hood of Monterey	Maria Belmonte Sanchez	
1948	Stage Struck	Miss Lloyd	
1948	The Golden Eye	Sister Teresa	
1949	Life of St. Paul Series	Jailer's Wife	
1950	Again Pioneers	Alice Keeler	
