= Lady Robinhood =

1925 film

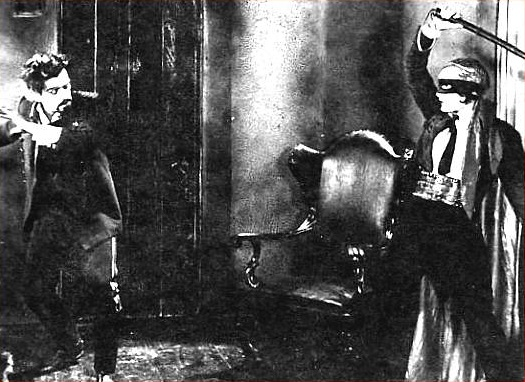
- Film still with Karloff and Brent
- Directed by: Ralph Ince
- Written by: Clifford Howard; Burke Jenkins; Fred Myton
- Starring: Evelyn Brent; Robert Ellis; Boris Karloff
- Cinematography: Silvano Balboni
- Production company: Robertson-Cole Pictures Corporation
- Distributed by: Film Booking Offices of America
- Release date: July 26, 1925
- Running time: 6 reels
- Country: United States
- Language: Silent (English intertitles)

Lady Robinhood is a 1925 American silent drama film directed by Ralph Ince, starring Evelyn Brent, and featuring Boris Karloff. This is a lost film, but the trailer itself survives.

== Plot ==
As described in a film magazine reviews, in one of the provinces of Spain, cut off by impassable roads, is a people who are ruled by a tyrannical governor and his friend, Cabraza. The ward of the governor, Senorita Catalina, is sympathetic with the peasants and convict labor and, by impersonating a "Lady Robinhood," seeks to gain for them relief. An American, Hugh Winthrop, enters the province and is captured by La Ortiga (the feminine of Robinhood). He escapes and returns to the palace of the governor where he notices the similarity of the Senorita Catalina to La Ortiga. Confronted, she breaks into tears. Each confesses their love for the other. Raimundo sees the love scene and warns the troops that La Ortiga is in the palace. A raid follows. La Ortiga, Hugh, and Marie are captured. La Ortiga escapes to the hills where she calls her people together and a raid is made upon the palace in time to prevent the death of Hugh and Marie. The governor is seized.

== Cast ==
- Evelyn Brent as Señorita Catalina / La Ortiga
- Robert Ellis as Hugh Winthrop
- Boris Karloff as Cabraza
- William Humphrey as Governor
- D'Arcy Corrigan as Padre
- Robert Cauterio as Raimundo

== Preservation ==
With no prints of Lady Robinhood in any film archives, it is a lost film, but a trailer for the film survives in the collection of the Library of Congress.

== See also ==
- Boris Karloff filmography
