= Forbidden Cargo (1925 film) =

1925 film

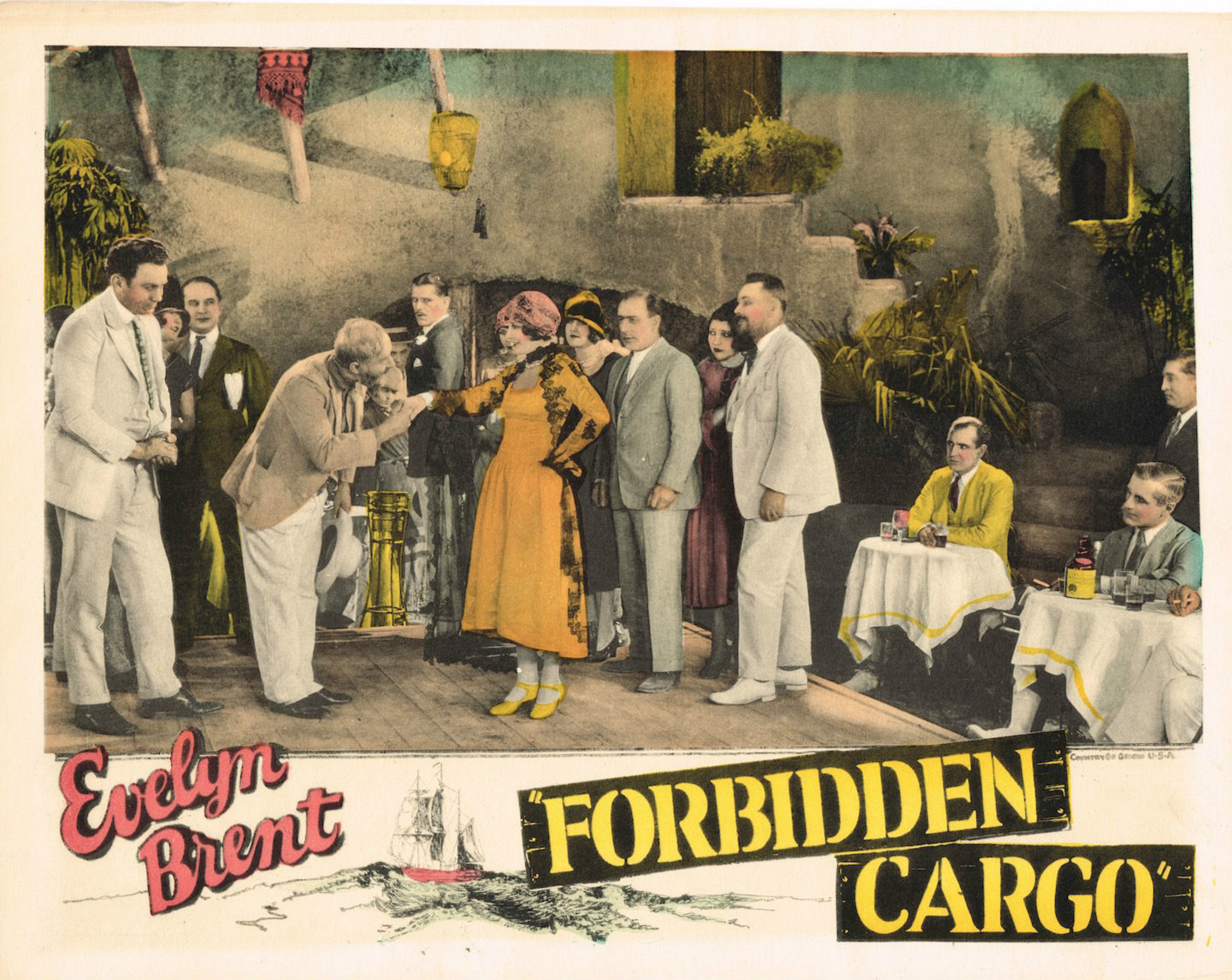
- Lobby card
- Directed by: Tom Buckingham
- Written by: Fred Myton
- Starring: Evelyn Brent; Robert Ellis; Boris Karloff
- Cinematography: Silvano Balboni
- Distributed by: Robertson-Cole Pictures Corporation
- Release date: February 22, 1925
- Running time: 5 reels
- Country: United States
- Language: Silent (English intertitles)

Forbidden Cargo is a 1925 American silent drama film directed by Tom Buckingham and featuring Boris Karloff. The film is considered to be lost.

== Plot ==
As described in a film magazine review, Captain Drake's services to the government has gone unrecognized, and he has grown to be a bitter old man. His daughter Polly carries on and becomes the captain of a rum-running schooner, known only as Captain Joe. Jerry Burke of the Secret Service has been assigned to ferret out the illicit traders. He becomes interested in Polly but the young woman's confederate, Pietro Castillano, learns Jerry's identity, so they shanghai him. In a battle between bootleggers and hijackers, Jerry escapes with the young woman to an island. Here they are captured by the gang, but are saved when she signals the marines. Jerry and Polly are then wed.

== Cast ==
- Evelyn Brent as Polly O'Day
- Robert Ellis as Jerry Burke
- Boris Karloff as Pietro Castillano
- Jack Kenny as Minor Role (uncredited)

== See also ==
- List of American films of 1925
