= Maton (surname) =

Maton is a surname. Notable people with the surname include:

- Georges Maton (1913–1998), French cyclist
- Mathieu Maton (born 1981), French footballer
- Nick Maton (born 1997), American baseball player
- Phil Maton (born 1993), American baseball player
- Polly Maton (born 1999), British para-sprinter
- William George Maton (1774–1835), English physician
