= Alias Mary Flynn =

1925 film

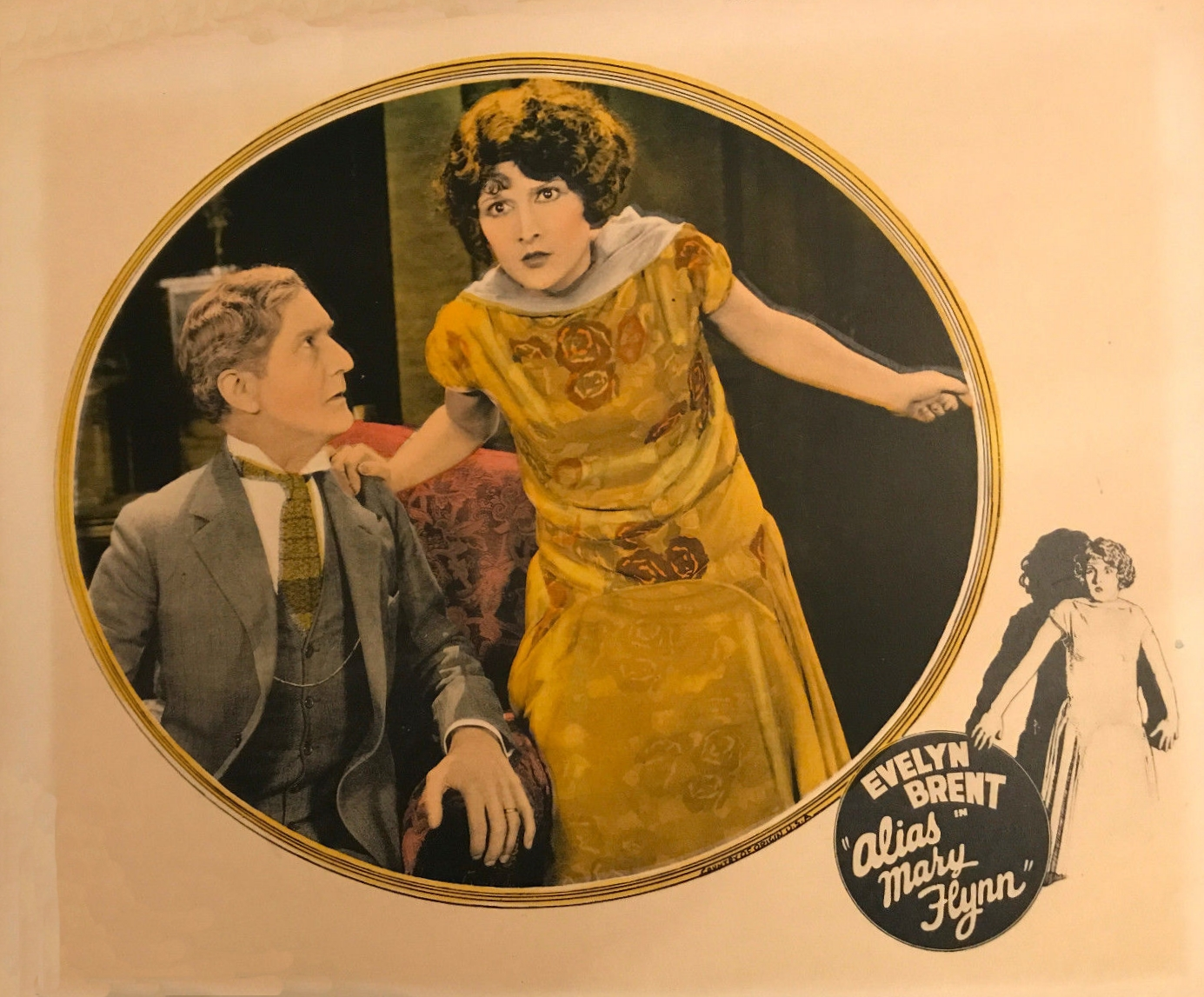
- Lobby card
- Directed by: Ralph Ince
- Written by: Edward J. Montagne; Fred Myton
- Starring: Evelyn Brent
- Cinematography: Silvano Balboni
- Distributed by: Film Booking Offices of America (FBO)
- Release date: May 3, 1925
- Running time: 60 minutes
- Country: United States
- Language: Silent (English intertitles)

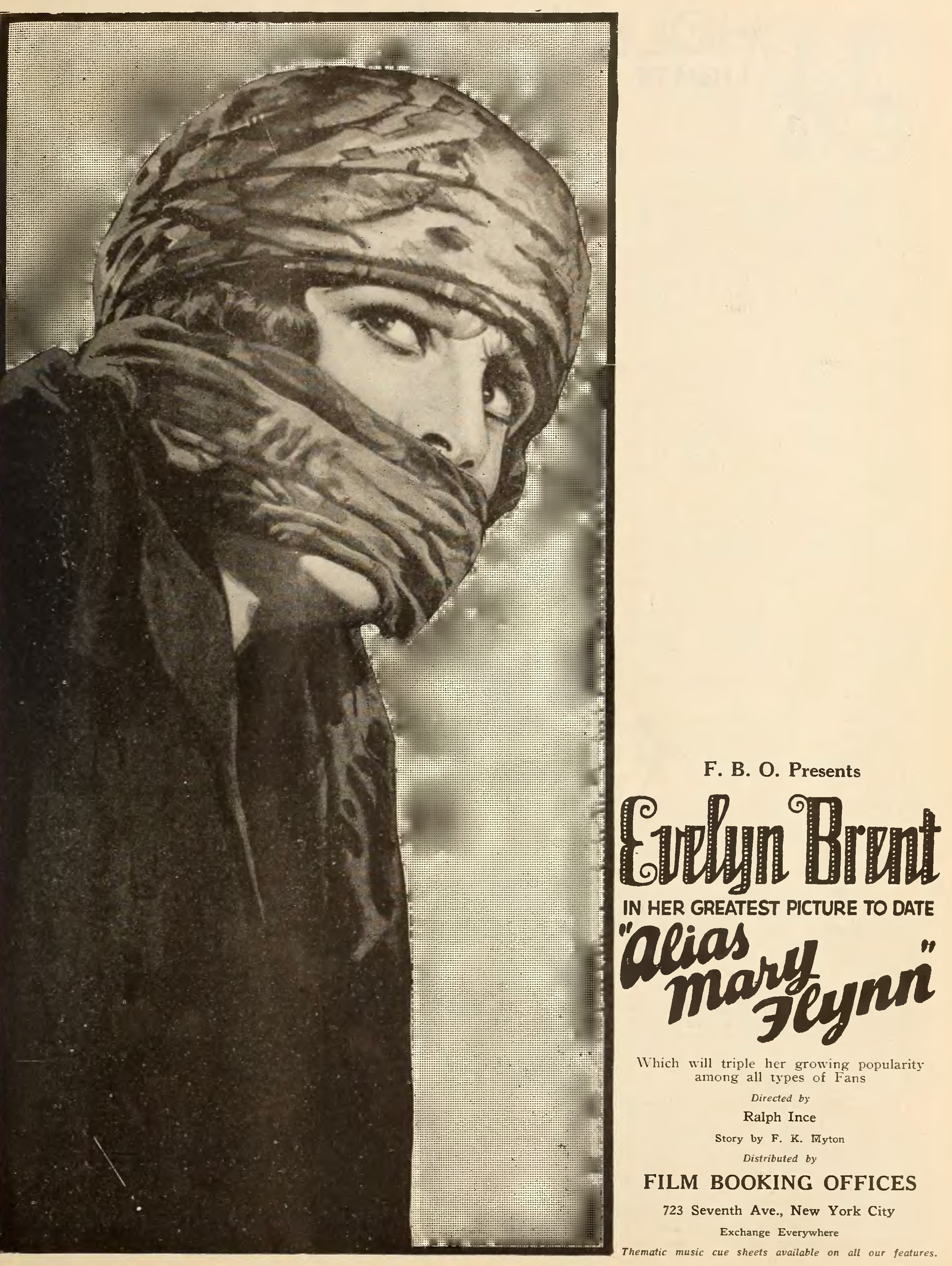
Alias Mary Flynn ad from Exhibitor's Trade Review, 1925

Alias Mary Flynn is a 1925 American silent drama film directed by Ralph Ince and starring Evelyn Brent. The film is considered to be lost.

== Plot ==
As described in a film magazine review, John Reagan Sr. adopts Mary Flynn after rescuing her from the police who wanted her in connection with a robbery. Jason Forbes, a jewel collector, attempts to use Reagan in a plot to steal a valuable gem. When he refuses, Forbes threatens to expose an incident in Reagan's past life, and then Forbes is killed. Reagan is rescued from the electric chair by Mary, who helps to capture the culprit of the murder. Mary goes on to marry Reagan's son Tim, a young district attorney.

== Cast ==
- Evelyn Brent as Mary Flynn
- Malcolm McGregor as Tim Reagan
- William V. Mong as John Reagan
- Gladden James as Picadilly Charlie
- Louis Payne as Jason Forbes
- Wilson Benge as Maurice Deperre
- John Gough as Mickey
- Jacques D'Auray as Chief of Crooks
