= Fred Myton =

American screenwriter (1885–1955)

- Born: November 15, 1885; Garden City, Kansas, U.S.
- Died: June 6, 1955 (aged 69); Los Angeles, California, U.S.
- Occupation: Screenwriter
- Years active: 1916-1954

Fred Myton (November 15, 1885 – June 6, 1955) was an American screenwriter. He wrote 168 films between 1916 and 1952, mostly low-budget "B" pictures for Poverty Row studios and independent producers. He wrote many films for Producers Releasing Corporation.

== Partial filmography ==
- Barriers of Society (1916)
- The Social Buccaneer (1916)
- Triumph (1917)
- Come Through (1917)
- The Empty Gun (1917)
- Fighting Mad (1917)
- Love Aflame (1917)
- Fear Not (1917)
- The Lash of Power (1917)
- The Spotted Lily (1917)
- Follow the Girl (1917)
- The Terror (1917)
- The Devil's Pay Day (1917)
- Heart Strings (1917)
- Fighting for Love (1917)
- Mr. Dolan of New York (1917)
- Princess Virtue (1917)
- The Charmer (1917)
- All Night (1918)
- Maid o' the Storm (1918)
- Shackled (1918)
- The Prince and Betty (1919)
- Fighting Cressy (1919)
- Desert Gold (1919)
- The Gray Wolf's Ghost (1919)
- The Deadlier Sex (1920)
- Dice of Destiny (1920)
- Felix O'Day (1920)
- The Land of Hope (1921)
- A Game Chicken (1922)
- South of Suva (1922)
- Where the North Begins (1923)
- The Brass Bottle (1923)
- Torment (1924)
- The Heart Bandit (1924)
- Midnight Molly (1925)
- Forbidden Cargo (1925)
- Lady Robinhood (1925)
- Smooth as Satin (1925)
- Flaming Waters (1925)
- Alias Mary Flynn (1925)
- Three of a Kind (1925)
- Broadway Lady (1925)
- Parisian Nights (1925)
- The Isle of Retribution (1926)
- Queen o'Diamonds (1926)
- The Mysterious Rider (1927)
- The Wreck of the Singapore (1928)
- The Air Legion (1929)
- The Voice of the Storm (1929)
- Smoke Bellew (1929)
- The Great Divide (1929)
- The Gambling Terror (1937)
- Harlem on the Prairie (1937)
- Two Gun Justice (1938)
- Hitler, Beast of Berlin (1939)
- Prairie Schooners (1940)
- The Pinto Kid (1941)
- White Eagle (1941)
- Gentleman from Dixie (1941)
- The Lone Prairie (1942)
- The Mad Monster (1942)
- Dead Men Walk (1943)
- Black Hills Express (1943)
- Thundering Gun Slingers (1944)
- Apology for Murder (1945)
- Lady Chaser (1946)
- Murder Is My Business (1946)
- Too Many Winners (1947)
- Western Pacific Agent (1950)
- The Gunman (1952)
