= Mytton =

Mytton may refer to:

== People ==
- Mytton (surname)
- Alex Mytton, cast member of television series Made in Chelsea

== Other uses ==
- Mytton, Shropshire, England
- Mytton and Mermaid Hotel, a Grade II listed building in Atcham, England
