= Film Booking Offices of America =

American film studio of the silent era

FBO Pictures Corp.
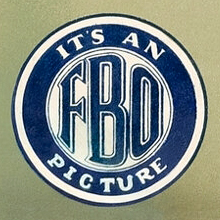
- Logo from 1926
- Trade name: Film Booking Offices of America
- Type: Private
- Industry: Motion pictures
- Predecessor: Robertson-Cole Corp.
- Founded: 1922; 104 years ago
- Defunct: 1929
- Fate: Assets transferred to Radio-Keith-Orpheum Corp.
- Successor: RKO Pictures
- Headquarters: 1922–1925: 723 Seventh Avenue, New York, NY; 1926–1929: 1560 Broadway, New York, NY

Film Booking Offices of America (FBO), registered as FBO Pictures Corp., was an American film studio of the silent era, a midsize producer and distributor of mostly low-budget films. The business began in 1918 as Robertson-Cole, an Anglo-American import-export company. Robertson-Cole began distributing films in the United States that December and opened a Los Angeles production facility in 1920. Late that year, R-C entered into a working relationship with East Coast financier Joseph P. Kennedy. A business reorganization in 1922 led to its assumption of the FBO name, first for all its distribution operations and ultimately for its own productions as well. Through Kennedy, the studio contracted with Western leading man Fred Thomson, who grew by 1925 into one of Hollywood's most popular stars. Thomson was just one of several silent screen cowboys with whom FBO became identified.

The studio, whose core market was America's small towns, also put out many romantic melodramas, action pictures, and comedic shorts. Pauline Frederick and Sessue Hayakawa were the major stars of its R-C period. Subsequently, Evelyn Brent and Richard Talmadge were FBO's biggest non-Western stars. Tom Tyler played the lead in twenty-nine cowboy pictures for the studio. Alberta Vaughn headlined five FBO short series. The studio's most prolific directors included Ralph Ince, William Seiter, and Emory Johnson. From 1925 forward, adaptations of the works of Gene Stratton-Porter were consistently among its top box office attractions.

In 1926, Kennedy led an investment group that acquired the company, and he ran it hands-on—traveling frequently to California—with considerable success. Exhibitors cited The Keeper of the Bees, based on a Stratton-Porter novel, as the year's most popular film. In early 1928, Kennedy froze Fred Thomson out of the movie business as FBO signed the premier silent Western star, Tom Mix. That August, using RCA Photophone technology, FBO became the second Hollywood studio to release a feature-length "talkie". Two months later, Kennedy and RCA executive David Sarnoff arranged the merger between FBO and the Keith-Albee-Orpheum theater circuit that created RKO, one of the major studios of Hollywood's Golden Age. FBO's assets were folded into the new company, and it was dissolved in early 1929.

== Business history ==
=== The R-C years ===
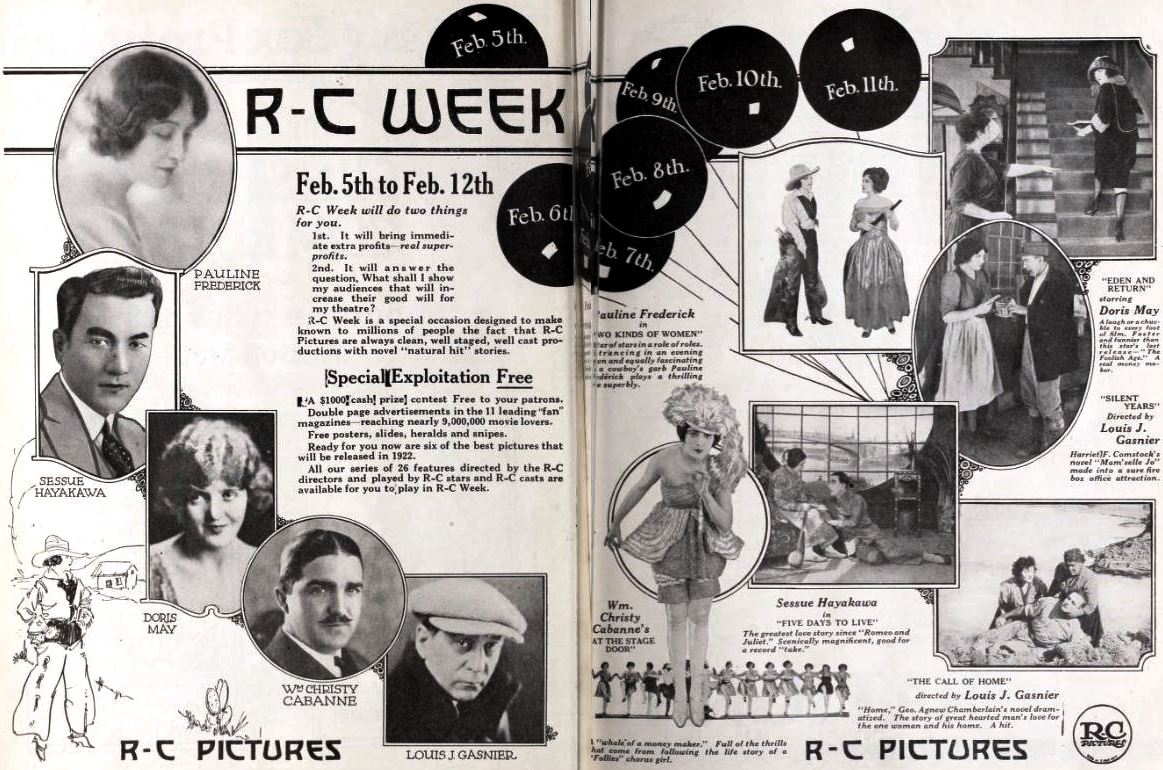
December 1921 Robertson-Cole ad, featuring Pauline Frederick and Sessue Hayakawa

The company that would become FBO began as Robertson-Cole, an importer, exporter, and motion picture distributor with headquarters in London and New York, founded in 1918 by Englishman Harry F. Robertson and American Rufus S. Cole. The company handled American-made trucks, cars, automobile accessories, and Bell & Howell motion picture equipment; its initial film distribution focus was on the Northern European, South Asian, and Latin American markets. From its U.S. office, R-C Pictures, as it was often branded, started American motion picture distribution late in 1918, purchasing film rights from independent production companies and selling them on to Exhibitors Mutual Distributing, a corporate successor of the Mutual Film studio. In November, R-C contracted to serve as the sole provider to Exhibitors Mutual, and its first acquisitions were released the following month. For its top-of-the-line "product", it purchased the movies of star actor Sessue Hayakawa, whose films were produced by his own company, Haworth Pictures Corporation. Other companies also made films expressly for R-C distribution: B.B. Features, Jesse D. Hampton Productions, National Film Corporation, Winsome Stars. To accompany its features, Robertson-Cole also acquired a wide variety of serials and other shorts, from Supreme Comedies with Harry Depp and Teddy Sampson to a biweekly series, On the Borderland of Civilization, filmed by adventurer Martin Johnson. Late in 1919, independent motion picture producer Frank Hall acquired Exhibitors Mutual and integrated it into his new Hallmark Exchanges. In January 1920, Robertson-Cole purchased Hallmark, securing the capacity to directly distribute the films to which it owned rights, including the in-house productions then being planned.

In March, the inaugural "convention of the branch managers and field supervisors of the Robertson-Cole Distributing Corporation" was announced. The company currently boasted a slate of twenty-five movies in theaters around the country, with its top films co-branded "Superior Pictures". The first R-C feature productions began to appear, including The Third Woman that same month, directed by Charles Swickard and starring Carlyle Blackwell and Louise Lovely, and The Wonder Man, directed by John G. Adolfi and starring boxer Georges Carpentier, which had a premiere on May 29 and went into general release in July. With its move into production, Robertson-Cole needed its own filmmaking studio: in June, it acquired a lot around fifteen acres (six hectares) in size in Los Angeles's fortuitously named Colegrove district, then adjacent to but soon to be subsumed by Hollywood. For exterior shoots, the company purchased 460 acres in Santa Monica, to be known as the "R-C Ranch". In September, contracts were signed for the construction on the Colegrove property of an administration building with a massive neoclassical façade and eight stages, each occupying nearly a third of an acre. The first film to shoot at the facility, while it was still being built, was the independent production Kismet (1920), directed by Louis J. Gasnier. With the West Coast operation up and running, Hayakawa's production company was absorbed into Robertson-Cole.

Rufus Cole also entered into a working relationship with Hallmark investor Joseph P. Kennedy, father of future U.S. president John F. Kennedy and then a broker at the New York banking firm of Hayden, Stone. In December, after lengthy negotiations, Kennedy set up his own wholly owned company, Robertson-Cole Distributing Corporation of New England, to handle the business's films in an area where he had a controlling interest in a regional theater chain (though it was locked out of Massachusetts by the leading exhibitors). In February 1921, the movie heralded as Robertson-Cole's first "official" production came out: The Mistress of Shenstone, directed by Henry King and starring Pauline Frederick, a former headliner with Famous Players–Lasky and Goldwyn Pictures. At the same time, the business was $5 million in debt from the L.A. studio purchase and draining money—banks were reluctant to issue lines of credit to any but the biggest film companies, and R-C was forced to pay interest rates as high as 18 percent to so-called bonus sharks to access working capital. The company's primary investor, the Graham's of London firm, turned to Kennedy to find a buyer, giving him a seat on the R-C board, paying him a monthly adviser's fee, and promising a sizable commission. Though he failed to arrange the sale Graham's was looking for (and his own offer to buy 25 percent of the business was turned down), Kennedy would become deeply involved with the studio in the coming years.

=== A new identity ===
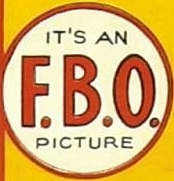
FBO logo from 1924 to 1925

In 1922, Robertson-Cole underwent a major reorganization as the company's founders departed. The flagship U.S. distribution business changed its name to Film Booking Offices of America, a banner under which R-C had released more than a dozen independent productions. The West Coast studio operation continued to make films under the Robertson-Cole name for some time, but FBO ultimately became the primary identity of the business for production as well as distribution. Between May 1922 and October 1923, one of the company's new American investors, Pat Powers, was effectively in command. Powers had previously led his own filmmaking company, part of the multiple mergers that created the large Universal studio in 1912. During his time in charge at FBO, his brand was added to many of its films: "P. A. Powers Presents". Among its outside suppliers of the period were Chester Bennett Productions, Hunt Stromberg Productions, and Tiffany Productions. While Kennedy left the board in July 1923 (and sold back his New England franchise for a sizable profit), he leveraged his friendship with top screenwriter Frances Marion and her husband, accomplished athlete, ordained minister, and neophyte actor Fred Thomson, to help arrange a distribution deal between FBO and Thomson for half a dozen independent Westerns. An in-house series of boxing-themed shorts, Fighting Blood, starring FBO newcomer George O'Hara, grew so popular it was often billed above the accompanying feature. O'Hara would become an FBO mainstay, as would Alberta Vaughn, who specialized in shorts: most of her films were two-reelers, a measure of film length indicating a running time of fifteen to twenty-five minutes. (Many feature films of the era were no more than five reels.)

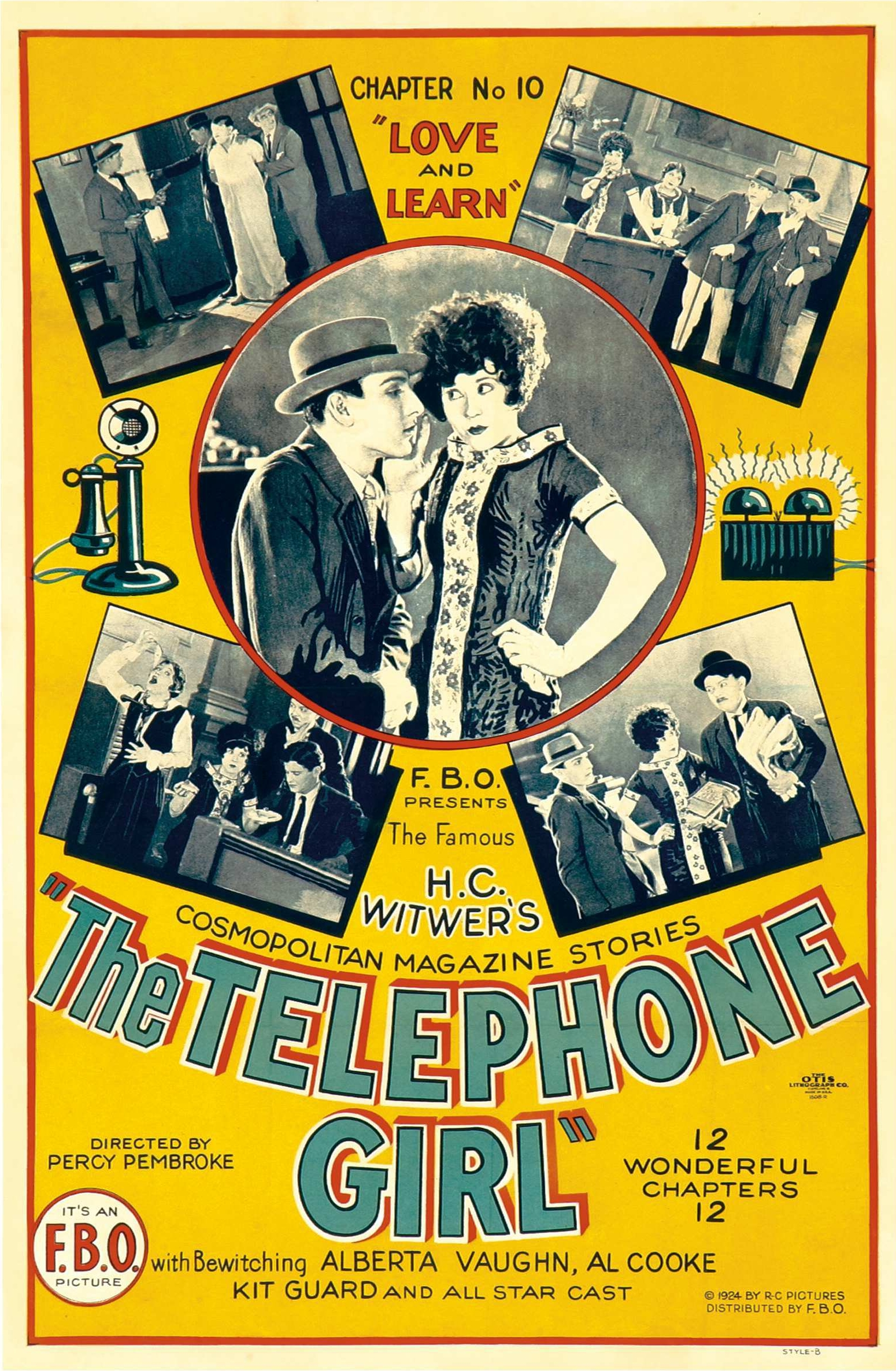
Love and Learn (1924) was the tenth installment of The Telephone Girl, Alberta Vaughn's first FBO series of shorts. Not a true serial film, each of its "chapters" was a stand-alone tale.

H.C.S. Thomson of Graham's, already chairman of the board, became the business's managing director with the departure of Powers. B. P. Fineman was hired as the studio's production chief in 1924; Evelyn Brent, his wife, moved over from Fox to become FBO's top dramatic star. Fred Thomson's fame was surging, and in April 1925, FBO vice-president Joseph I. Schnitzer signed him to a studio contract paying $6,000 a week—roughly $110,152 in 2025 dollars. Behind only the enormously popular Tom Mix, Thomson was now the second-highest paid of all cowboy actors; his horse, Silver King, beloved by audiences, was covered by a $100,000 insurance policy. The deal also gave Thomson his own dedicated production unit at the studio. In December 1925, the Exhibitors Herald published its first annual list of the biggest box office films of the year (ending November 15) based on a national survey of theater owners. FBO's top five attractions were led by A Girl of the Limberlost, an adaptation of a novel by bestselling author Gene Stratton-Porter, who had died the previous December; this was followed by Broken Laws, an issue-driven melodrama detailing the dire consequences of not spanking naughty children, and three Fred Thomson "oaters": The Bandit's Baby, The Wild Bull's Lair, and Thundering Hoofs.

As a distributor, Film Booking Offices focused on marketing its films to small-town exhibitors and independent theater chains (that is, those not owned by one of the major Hollywood studios). As a production company, it concentrated on low-budget movies, with an emphasis on Westerns, action films, romantic melodramas, and comedy shorts. From its first productions in early 1920 through late 1928, just before it was dissolved in a merger, the company, as either Robertson-Cole Pictures or FBO Pictures, produced more than 400 features. The studio's top-of-the-line movies—"specials", in industry parlance—aimed at major exhibition venues beyond the reach of most FBO films, were sometimes marketed as FBO "Gold Bond" pictures. Between 1924 and 1926, seven of Evelyn Brent's star vehicles as well as two other high-end films were produced under the label of Gothic Pictures or Gothic Productions. With neither the backing of large corporate interests nor the daily money generator of its own theater chain and far from its London owners, the company faced persistent cash-flow difficulties. The significant financial drain of its reliance on short-term, high-interest loans continued.

=== Kennedy takes command ===
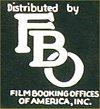
FBO distribution logo from 1926

While still at the Hayden, Stone investment firm, Kennedy had boasted to a colleague, "Look at that bunch of pants pressers in Hollywood making themselves millionaires. I could take the whole business away from them." In 1925, he set out to do so, forming his own group of investors led by wealthy Boston lawyer Guy Currier, Filene's department store owner Louis Kirstein, and Union Stockyards and Armour and Company owner Frederick H. Prince. In August 1925, Kennedy traveled to England with an offer to buy a controlling stake in Film Booking Offices for $1 million. The bid was initially rejected—Graham's and co-financier Lloyd's had poured no less than $7 million into the company—but in February 1926, FBO's owners decided to take the money. From the studio's New York City headquarters, Kennedy swiftly addressed its perennial cash-flow problems, setting up a new business, the Cinema Credits Corporation, to provide FBO with reliable financing at favorable terms. He was elected FBO chairman in March and was soon traveling to Hollywood, where one of his first steps was to cut loose the various independent producers resident at the studio. The president of the Motion Picture Producers and Distributors Association, Will Hays—the industry's future censor in chief—was delighted by the new face on the scene; in his eyes, Kennedy signified both a desirable image for the film trade and Wall Street's faith in its prospects. As renowned journalist Terry Ramsaye wrote in Photoplay the following year, Hays had been seeking "to endow the febrile motion picture industry with an atmosphere of Americanism and substantiality. Kennedy is a valuable personality from this point of view. He is exceedingly American" (historian Cari Beauchamp explains the connotation: "not Jewish", in contrast to most of the studio heads). Ramsaye went on to celebrate Kennedy's "background of lofty and conservative financial connections, an atmosphere of much home and family life and all those fireside virtues of which the public never hears in the current news from Hollywood."

Publicity photo of Fred Thomson, FBO's biggest box-office draw during the mid-1920s

Studio chief Fineman departed around the time of Kennedy's purchase to work at the larger First National Pictures. The new owner hired Edwin King away from Famous Players–Lasky's New York studio to replace him, but took a personal hand in guiding the company creatively as well as financially. His brand, "Joseph P. Kennedy Presents", would proceed to appear on over a hundred films. Kennedy soon brought stability to FBO, making it one of the most reliably profitable outfits in the minor leagues of the Hollywood studio system. The focus was on films with Main Street appeal and minimal costs. "We are trying", he declared, "to be the Woolworth and Ford of the motion picture industry rather than the Tiffany." Some stars were less than pleased with Kennedy's penny-pinching; Evelyn Brent, in particular, was troubled by what she saw as FBO's declining production standards and was granted her release. Westerns remained the studio's backbone, along with various action pictures and romantic scenarios; as Kennedy put it, "Melodrama is our meat." Gene Stratton-Porter, then, was the gravy: according to the 1926 Exhibitors Herald survey, The Keeper of the Bees, for which shooting was completed while the novel was still being serialized in McCall's, was the number one picture in the entire country that year. The remainder of FBO's top five comprised, once again, three Fred Thomson pictures, along with another Stratton-Porter adaptation.

During this period, the average production cost of FBO features was around $50,000, and few were budgeted at anything more than $75,000. By comparison, in 1927–28 the average cost at Fox was $190,000; at Metro-Goldwyn-Mayer, $275,000. In a broad economization move, in 1927, FBO ended the long-term contracts with writers that were an industry norm, shifting story assignments to a freelance basis. One major expense Kennedy didn't spare: with the powerful United Artists and Paramount studios circling Fred Thomson, Kennedy kept him at FBO for $15,000 a week (assigning the contract to a newly created corporation, Fred Thomson Productions, "for tax purposes"). The actor now had the second-highest straight salary in the entire industry, surpassed only by Tom Mix again, whose new arrangement with Fox paid $17,500. Thomson's were among those few FBO films budgeted at or above $75,000, but they could be relied on to gross in the quarter-million-dollar range. And Kennedy found an angle to make himself even more money. Under the new contract, Kennedy struck a deal in early 1927 with Paramount for the major studio to produce and distribute a series of four Thomson "super westerns". Kennedy participated in the films' financing, recouping his stake plus $100,000 in profits each; Paramount covered Thomson's weekly salary; and the actor's production unit stayed on the FBO lot. Given the lag time between production and exhibition, of the four Thomson features that reached theaters in 1927, three were FBO releases. The studio put out fifty-one features in total that year; for the twelve-month period ending November 15, theater owners judged FBO's top three films to all be Gene Stratton-Porter adaptations, with two Thomson oaters following.

== Cinematic legacy ==
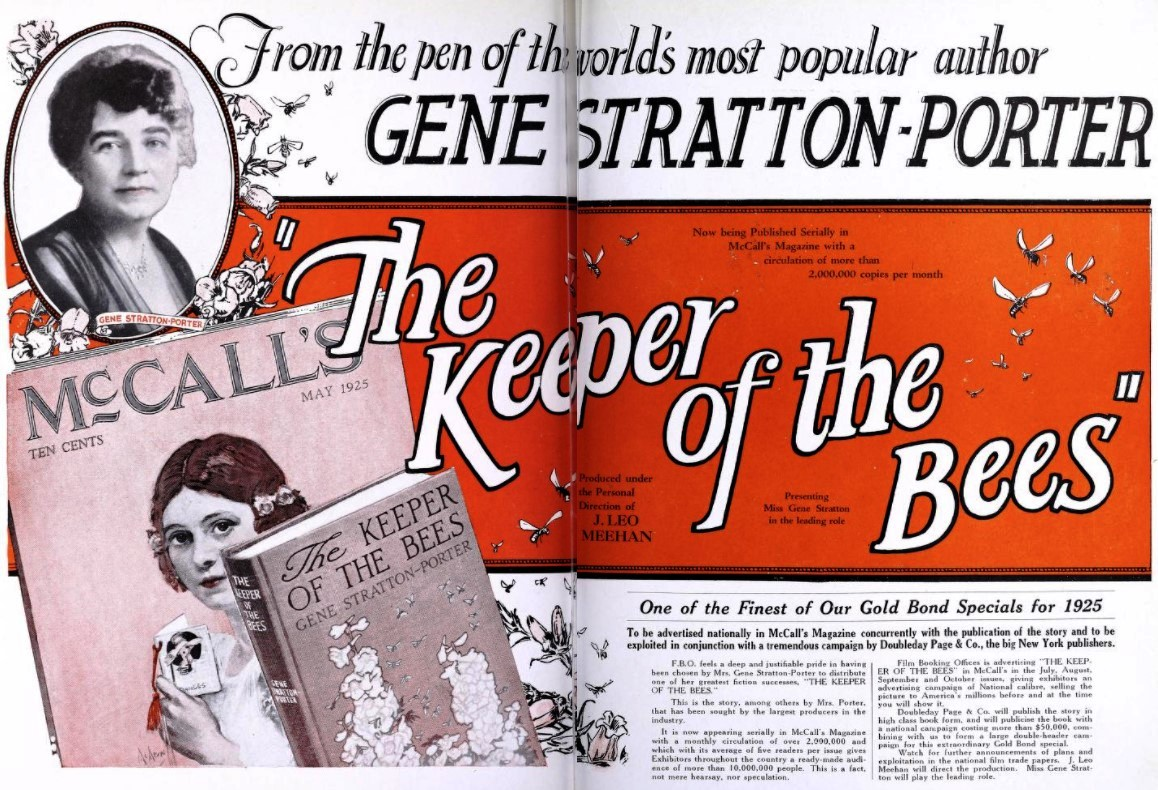
In an age when popular films might run for years in different locations around the country and many hundreds were released every exhibition season, The Keeper of the Bees, according to theater owners, ranked 64th nationally in 1925, 1st in 1926, 34th in 1927, and 71st in 1928.

A large majority of FBO/Robertson-Cole pictures, produced during the silent era and the transitional period of the conversion to sound cinema, are considered to be lost films, with no copies known to exist. Much of FBO's cinematic legacy thus endures only in still images, other publicity materials, and written accounts. All told, just 30 percent of American silent feature films have been preserved (25 percent more or less complete, plus another 5 percent in incomplete versions). The overall survival rate of features produced by R-C/FBO is similar: of 449 movies identified by the National Film Preservation Board as R-C/FBO productions, 125 are known to survive in some form—28 percent, though with only two (0.4 percent) in a legacy studio archive. The losses, moreover, were not equally distributed, and one of FBO's most successful franchises has disappeared entirely: not even a fragmentary print of any of the six Gene Stratton-Porter films put out by the studio has been found. Due to its zeal for cost cutting, FBO was reputed to be especially meticulous in the execution of a practice then common among distributors: rounding up its release prints at the end of a picture's run and melting them down to recover the silver in the film emulsion.

As for FBO's biggest star, among America's biggest at the time, of the twenty films Fred Thomson made for the studio, for years just a single one was known to remain intact in a US archive: Thundering Hoofs. About three reels' worth of the five-reel Galloping Gallagher (1924) were also known to survive. In 1982, film scholar Bruce Firestone wrote that "the disappearance, through loss or destruction, of virtually all of his films [has] turned Thomson into one of the least-known cowboys in the history of American movies." In the most sweeping act of destruction, Kennedy associates scrapped more than one hundred cans of the actor's movies—over a ton's worth of film—during the RKO transition. According to the Library of Congress's American Silent Feature Film Database, to the tiny remaining corpus of Thomson's work for FBO may now be added complete prints of The Dangerous Coward (1924) and A Regular Scout (1926) at the George Eastman House. Seven more Thomson features are held by archives abroad.

=== Headliners and celebrity casting ===
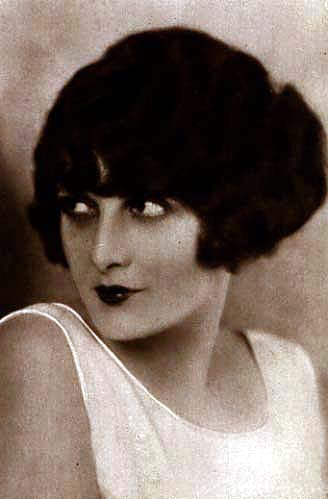
Publicity photo of Evelyn Brent, star of fourteen FBO releases between 1924 and 1926

Sessue Hayakawa, the first star of any magnitude associated with the Robertson-Cole brand, made a total of twenty films released by the studio, from A Heart in Pawn in March 1919 to The Vermilion Pencil in March 1922. Hayakawa was regarded as one of the finest screen performers of his time, but as anti-Japanese sentiment grew on the West Coast, R-C terminated its relationship with the Chiba-born actor. Two months after The Vermilion Pencil opened, he sued the studio for breach of contract. Pauline Frederick, celebrated for her performance in the September 1920 Goldwyn Pictures tear-jerker Madame X, immediately cashed in with a top-tier contract from Robertson-Cole, for whom she starred in more than half a dozen melodramas, beginning with A Slave of Vanity just two months later. She was said to have been paid an extravagant $7,000 or $7,500 a week under her R-C deal. Early in her career, ZaSu Pitts acted in six R-C releases—Better Times (1919) gave Pitts her first ever top billing—from the Brentwood Film Corporation, founded by a group of doctors.

In the years after the studio's rebranding, Evelyn Brent and Richard Talmadge were FBO's most prominent non-Western headliners. Brent made a specialty of melodramatic pictures with a crime angle, often billed as "crook melodramas"—in Midnight Molly (1925), she played an ambitious politician's faithless wife and her look-alike, a high-end cat burglar. Talmadge, a stunt designer and double for major stars including Douglas Fairbanks and Harold Lloyd, took the lead in action pictures for FBO—"stunt dramas" such as Stepping Lively (1924) and Tearing Through (1925). He appeared in eighteen FBO releases, more than half of them produced by his own company. Talmadge's last film for the studio was released in June 1926. By August, Brent was on her way to starring roles at Paramount. In October, Talmadge was judged to have been FBO's biggest non-Western draw of the year; in the first annual Exhibitors Herald theater owners' poll of top box office names, he placed thirtieth out of sixty.

Beginning in late 1924, Maurice "Lefty" Flynn starred in over a dozen action-filled "comedy dramas" released by FBO, all produced and directed by Harry Garson. Signing a new contract in 1925, the former Yale halfback demonstrated his range by playing a "fast riding motorcycle copper" in a May release, a "battling policeman" in September, and Breckenrdige Gamble, a bored millionaire turned international secret agent, in October. Ralph Lewis, a prolific character actor who had appeared in several D. W. Griffith films, including The Birth of a Nation and Intolerance, was top billed in at least eight FBO releases between 1922 and 1928. George O'Hara headlined multiple features as well as short series. Warner Baxter and Joe E. Brown were among the other popular FBO players. Anna Q. Nilsson starred in two of the studio's more notable productions, as did Douglas Fairbanks Jr. Pauline Frederick returned in 1926 for the title role in Her Honor, the Governor. When Evelyn Brent departed, Kennedy signed Viola Dana to a six-picture deal in hopes of filling the void. In FBO's waning months, former Fox star Olive Borden played the lead in three films. Boris Karloff appeared in six FBO pictures between 1925 and 1927; in two of his earliest major roles, he performed opposite Brent in the action-oriented Forbidden Cargo and Lady Robinhood (both 1925).

In its pre-Kennedy years, the studio did not hesitate to take advantage of scandal sheet–worthy events. After the death of celebrated actor Wallace Reid, brought on by morphine addiction, his widow, Dorothy Davenport, signed on as producer and star of a cinematic examination of the sins of substance abuse: Human Wreckage, released by FBO in June 1923, five months after Reid's death, in which Davenport (billed as Mrs. Wallace Reid) plays the wife of a noble attorney turned dope fiend. A few months later, the studio featured a celebrity of a very different sort: magician Harry Houdini, directing and starring in his last feature film, Haldane of the Secret Service. In November 1924, FBO put out Davenport's next "social problem" picture, Broken Laws. Here Davenport (again billed as Mrs. Wallace Reid) plays the overindulgent mother of an unruly boy destined, as a reckless teen, to commit a terrible misdeed. According to a trade journal—perhaps echoing publicity copy—the tale was "a reminder that the foundation of all law and order lies in that greatest of American institutions—the home."

When the biggest movie star in the world, Rudolph Valentino, split from his wife, Natacha Rambova, she was swiftly enlisted by the studio to costar with Clive Brook in the sensitively titled When Love Grows Cold (1926). Under Kennedy's control, the studio focused on marketing its roster of films as suitable for the "average American" and the entire family: "We can't make pictures and label them 'For Children,' or 'For Women' or 'For Stout People' or 'For Thin Ones.' We must make pictures that have appeal to all." Though Kennedy ended the scandal-sheet specials, FBO still found occasion for celebrity casting: One Minute to Play (1926), directed by Sam Wood, marked the film debut of football great "Red" Grange. Tennis stars Suzanne Lenglen and Mary Browne were signed for a series of "Racquet Girls" pictures that never made it to screen.

=== Western and canine stars ===
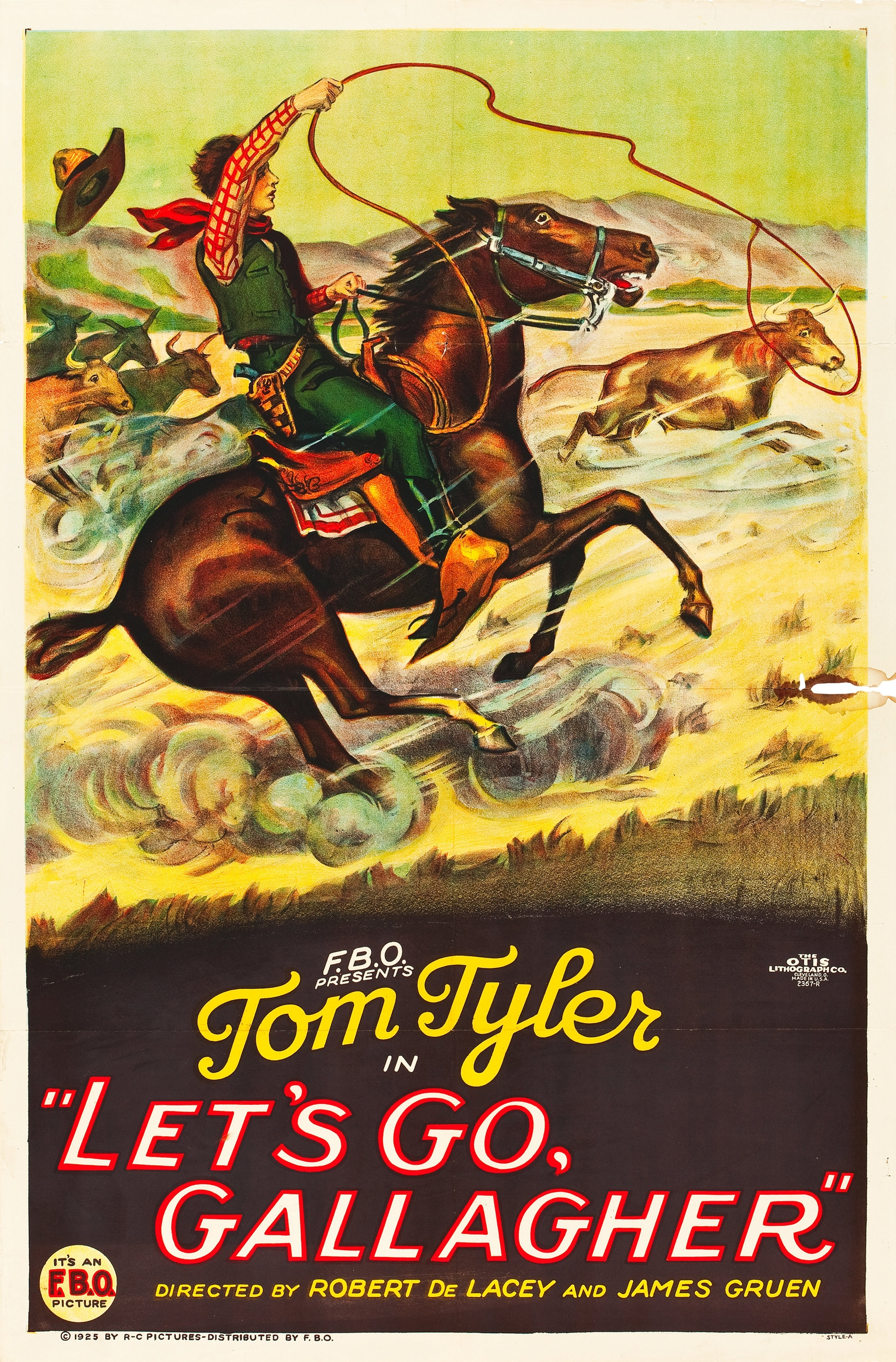
Tom Tyler, the most prolific of FBO's many Western stars, headlined twenty-nine movies for the studio, from Let's Go, Gallagher (1925) to The Pride of Pawnee (1929).

Central to the FBO identity were Westerns and the studio's major cowboy star, Fred Thomson. In both 1926 and 1927, he ranked number two among all male performers in the Exhibitors Herald poll, right behind Tom Mix. When one of Thomson's "oaters", The Two-Gun Man (1926), made it to New York's Warners' Theatre, the growing studio's Times Square showcase, it demonstrated that a Western, even one without Mix, could draw audiences to a first-run house in the most cosmopolitan of markets. Along with trusty Silver King, Thomson brought in millions to FBO, and Kennedy personally made almost half a million dollars from the "super western" loanout to Paramount. But when Kennedy learned early in 1928 that Mix, whose decade-old Fox contract was expiring, might become available, he used his control of Fred Thomson Productions, the supposed tax shelter, to freeze Thomson out of motion pictures entirely. That December, Thomson died—the immediate cause of death was tetanus; his widow, screenwriter Frances Marion, said that he had lost his will to live.

Among Western stars under long-term contract, FBO's next most important—though by a distance—was Tom Tyler, who finished twenty-third among men in the 1927 exhibitors' poll. Born Vincent Markowski, he had been a weightlifter and bit actor before his transformation into a cowboy headliner. According to a hyperbolic June 1927 report in Moving Picture World: "With Tom Tyler rapidly taking the place recently vacated by Fred Thomson [for the Paramount sojourn from which he would never return], F.B.O.'s program of western pictures is taking a place second to none in the industry. Tyler has made rapid strides during his two years with F.B.O. and with his horse 'Flash' and dog, 'Beans,' has become one of the leading favorites on the screen." Tyler's appeal was also enhanced by his human costars—Frankie Darro (tied for fifty-fourth in the poll) as his young sidekick on over two dozen occasions and starlets such as Doris Hill, Nora Lane, Sharon Lynn, and in Born to Battle (1926), a twenty-five-year-old Jean Arthur.

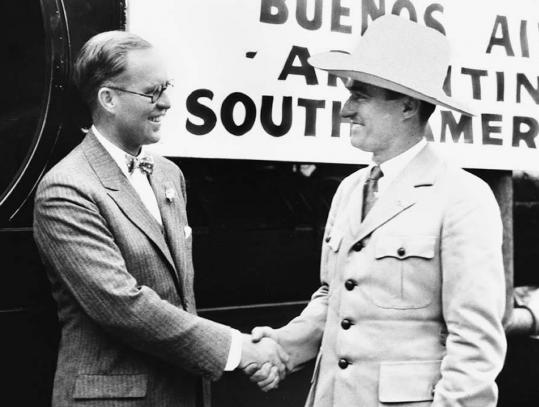
Kennedy and Tom Mix promote the signing of Mix's multipicture contract with FBO. The actor's plans to film in the Argentine Pampas were ultimately scrapped.

As 1928 began, Tyler was the most popular actor actually working at FBO, but Kennedy wanted the big gun. He bided his time as Tom Mix toured the Orpheum vaudeville theaters with a live show—boosting Kennedy's new exhibition interests—and legal machinations ensured Thomson's exile. Finally, Mix was signed to a six-film deal and began shooting in July. He ultimately made five pictures for the studio (two released after it had ceased to exist), and stayed near the top of the exhibitors' poll, his 112 votes good enough for second among the men, if well behind the 171 of MGM's Lon Chaney (no other FBO regular made it into even double digits). But the spread of the talkies was swiftly making the silent sagebrush superstar less of a sure thing. Variety derided Mix's last FBO film, The Big Diamond Robbery, released in May 1929, as "cowboy burlesque". His brief tenure at the studio was marked by salary grievances—he was now making only $10,000 a week—and dismay at FBO's inferior production values, from its worndown sets to the cut-rate film stock it used. Subsequently asked about his experience working with Kennedy, Mix described him as a "tight-assed, money-crazy son-of-a-bitch."

In addition to these major draws, there was also Harry Carey; a top star for Universal in the second half of the 1910s, he was still a bankable name when he made several FBO Westerns in 1922–23. The other cowboy stars of FBO included Bob Custer (tied for thirty-seventh in the 1927 poll), Bob Steele (tied for sixty-sixth with, among others, Silver King), and teenager Buzz Barton. One of the studio's most reliable Western headliners was a dog: Ranger (all alone at sixty-fifth among male performers). Beans had featured roles in a number of Tom Tyler/Frankie Darro Westerns. The fabled Strongheart starred in FBO's Jack London adaptation White Fang (1925). For a small role in the melodrama My Dad (1922), a three-year-old Alsatian who would become one of the greatest canine stars of all time was singled out by the New York Daily News: "Rin-Tin-Tin...runs off with most of the histrionic honors. The dog stages one of the most realistic and blood curdling fights we have seen recently."

=== Notable films and filmmakers ===
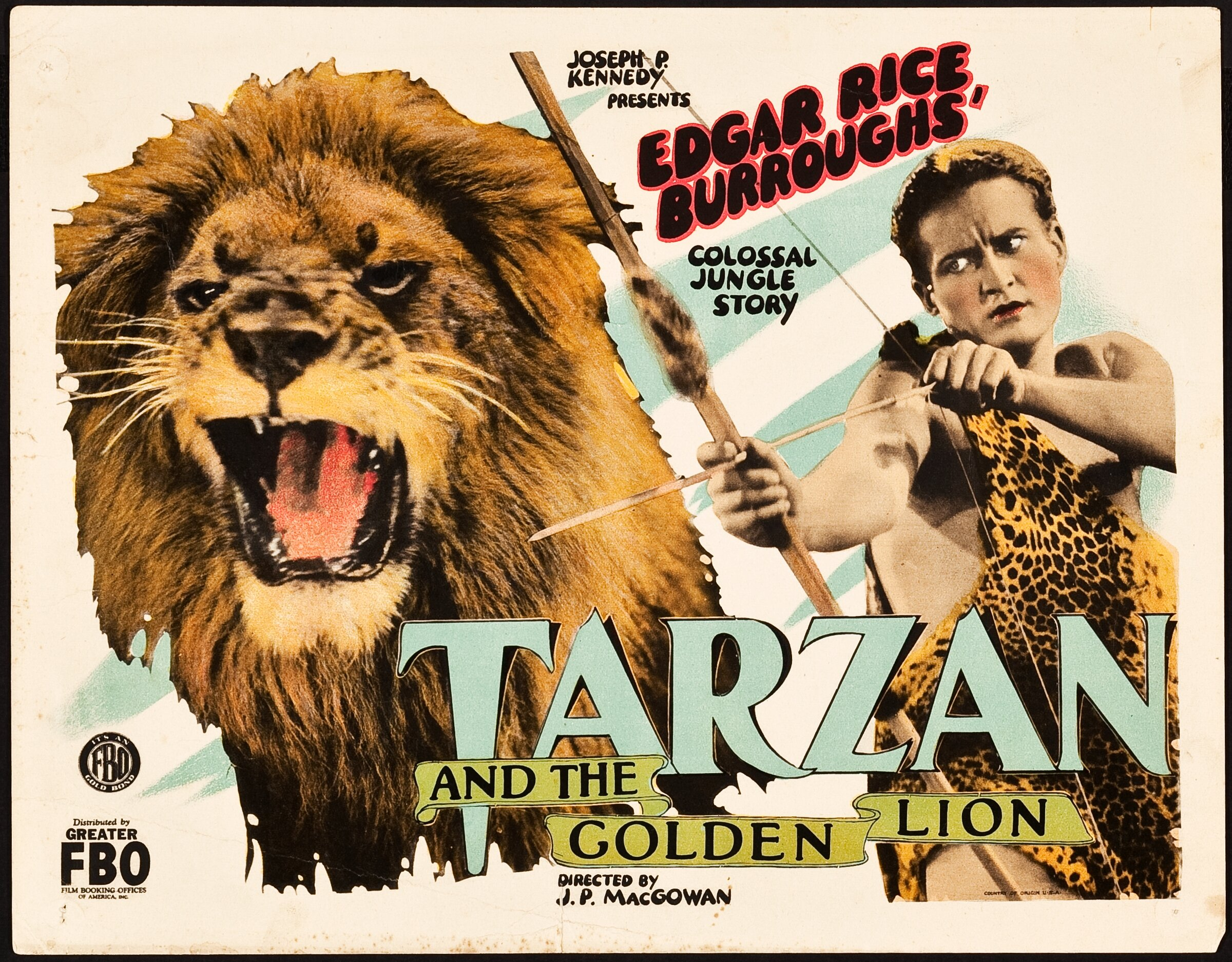
James Pierce in FBO's Tarzan and the Golden Lion (1927), which brought the famous character back to the big screen for the first time in over five years. Tarzan would remain a Hollywood fixture for the next four decades.

Kennedy had no illusions about his studio's place in the realm of cinematic art. A journalist once complimented him on FBO's recent output: "You have had some good pictures this year." Kennedy jocularly inquired, "What the hell were they?" From the pre-Kennedy era, RKO historian Betty Lasky identifies the Dorothy Davenport "problem" picture Broken Laws (1924), directed by Roy William Neill, as a rare "unforgettable picture of the higher caliber" put out by FBO. Reviews at the time called it "absorbing" and "vastly entertaining". Among the studio's action movies, one standout production was a 1927 Tarzan picture. Author Edgar Rice Burroughs declared, "If you want to see the personification of Tarzan of the Apes as I visualize him, see the film Tarzan and the Golden Lion with Mr. James Pierce." The Film Daily reviewer wrote that the movie "has a rather new order of thrills and atmosphere that might prove distinctly attractive."

Two of the studio's most impressive releases were foreign productions. In 1927, FBO picked up for U.S. distribution an acclaimed Austrian biblical spectacular made three years earlier: Die Sklavenkönigin (The Slave Queen, aka Moon of Israel) had already won its director, Michael Kertész, a job with Warner Bros. In Hollywood, he would make such hits as The Adventures of Robin Hood (1938) and Casablanca (1942) under the name Michael Curtiz. Una Nueva y gloriosa nación (1928), the most successful film in the history of Argentine silent cinema, was shot in Hollywood and distributed in the United States by FBO as The Charge of the Gauchos. One of its two cinematographers was Nicholas Musuraca, who established his career at Film Booking Offices. With RKO, Musuraca would become one of Hollywood's most respected cinematographers.

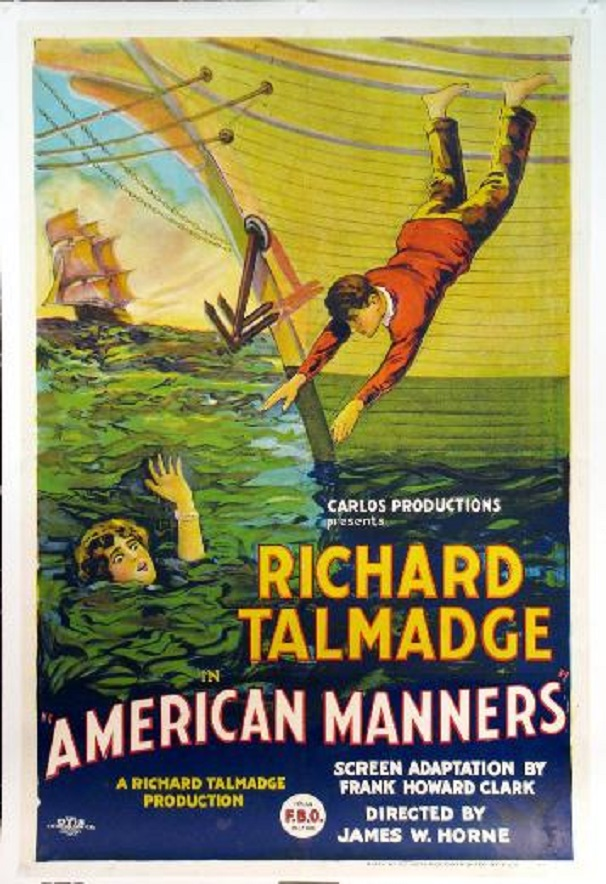
Richard Talmadge's fourth film for FBO, American Manners (1924), was directed by James W. Horne, who would go on to work with Buster Keaton and Laurel and Hardy.

At the age of twenty-five, King Vidor insisted on casting then little-known ZaSu Pitts as the lead in Better Times; he directed two more of her R-C/Brentwood films, both starring his wife, Florence Vidor. Louis J. Gasnier, responsible for the blockbuster 1914 serial The Perils of Pauline, directed several films for the company—from Good Women (1921) to The Call of Home (1922)—during its Robertson-Cole days. The best-known director to work regularly under the FBO brand was Ralph Ince, younger brother of celebrated filmmaker Thomas H. Ince. Pulling double duty on occasion, Ralph Ince starred in five of the sixteen films he made for the studio between 1925 and 1928. One production in which he served in both capacities was particularly well received: Chicago After Midnight (1928) was described by the New York Times as an "unusually well-acted and adroitly directed underworld story". After The Mistress of Shenstone, Henry King directed two more R-C films with Pauline Frederick, also in 1921: Salvage and The Sting of the Lash. Tod Browning directed two Gothic Pictures specials in 1924 starring Evelyn Brent: The Dangerous Flirt and Silk Stocking Sal. In 1921 and 1922 alone, William Seiter directed eight R-C/FBO releases, some produced directly for the studio, others independently; in 1924 he made two additional FBO releases for Palmer Photoplay, both featuring Madge Bellamy. Between 1922 and 1926, Emory Johnson produced and directed eight films for FBO. Historian William K. Everson has pointed to Seiter and Johnson as two of the overlooked directorial talents of the silent era.

Author and naturalist Gene Stratton-Porter set up her own production company to film screen adaptations of her work, a perhaps unprecedented venture for a writer. FBO handled four releases from Gene Stratton-Porter Productions—A Girl of the Limberlost (1924), The Keeper of the Bees (1925), Laddie (1926), and The Magic Garden (1927)—and was itself producer of record for The Harvester (1927) and Freckles (1928). All six were directed by Stratton-Porter's son-in-law, James Leo Meehan. All six were hits. All are considered lost. In-house, Frances Marion, who would win two writing Oscars in the 1930s, created the stories for seven of the FBO pictures starring her husband, Fred Thomson—for these brawny cowboy tales, such as Ridin' the Wind (1925) and The Tough Guy (1926), she used the pseudonym Frank M. Clifton (the "patronymic" was Thomson's middle name). Editor Pandro S. Berman, son of a major FBO stockholder, cut his first film for the studio at the age of twenty-one; in the 1930s, he would earn renown as an RKO producer and production chief. Famed RKO costume designer Walter Plunkett was also an FBO graduate.

=== Short subjects and animation ===
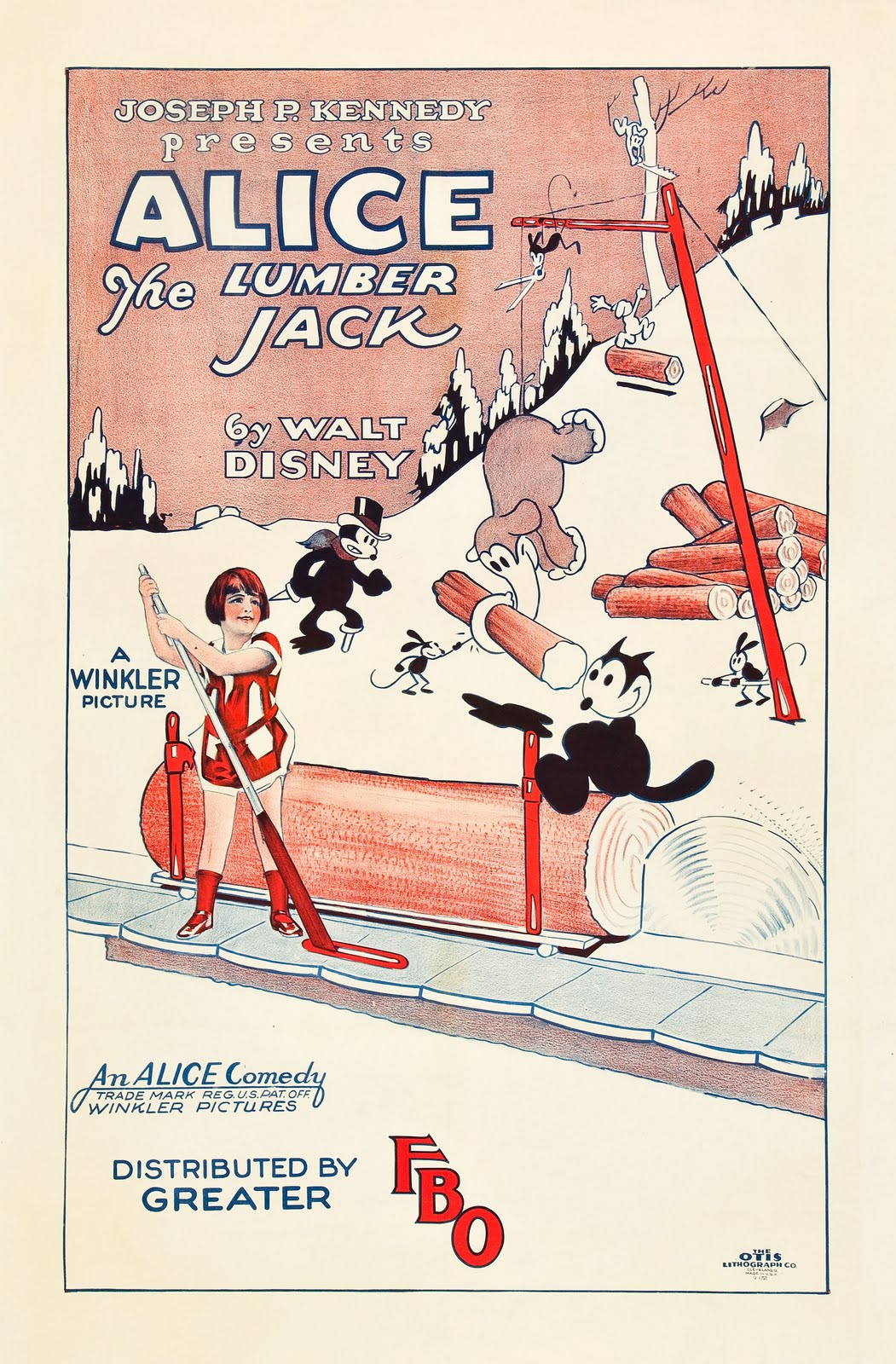
Ad for a 1926 Alice Comedy distributed by "Greater FBO"

Both George O'Hara's and Alberta Vaughn's initial short series for FBO—each directed by Malcolm St. Clair—were hits, so in the second half of 1924 the studio made a bid at teaming them in the twelve-part The Go-Getters, spoofing popular films and classic stories with chapters such A Kick for Cinderella. It was so successful that they were reunited the next year for a similar twelve-parter, The Pacemakers, with episodes such as Merton of the Goofies (Merton of the Movies) and Madam Sans Gin (Madame Sans-Gêne). Vaughn had solo top billing in the comedic series The Adventures of Mazie (1925–26) and the baseball-themed serial Fighting Hearts (1926). In May 1928, with the Keith-Albee-Orpheum theater chain under his control, Joseph Kennedy announced a forthcoming slate with not only more than the usual number of (relatively) high-budget films but a "Mammoth Program of Short Features". No less than four different series came from independent producer Larry Darmour, including the second twelve chapters of Mickey McGuire, starring seven-year-old Mickey Rooney. Amedee Van Beuren provided Walter Futter's Curiosities, a Ripley's-inspired "Movie Side Show" of "freaks and queer odds and ends from all corners of the world".

Of particular historical interest are two independently produced series of slapstick comedies released by the studio: Between 1924 and 1927, Joe Rock provided FBO with a substantial annual slate of two-reelers (twenty-six per year as of their last contract); twelve of those from 1924–25 starred Stan Laurel, before his famous partnership with Oliver Hardy. West of Hot Dog (1924), according to historian Simon Louvish, contains "one of [Laurel]'s finest gags," involving a level of cinematic technique that bears comparison to Buster Keaton's classic Sherlock Jr. In 1926–27, the company released more than a dozen shorts by innovative comedian/animator Charles Bowers, whose work imaginatively mixed live action and three-dimensional model animation.

FBO also distributed the output of significant creators of purely animated films. Between 1924 and 1926, FBO released the work of John Randolph Bray's cartoon studio, including the Dinky Doodle series created by Walter Lantz. In 1925–26, the studio put out twenty-six cartoons by animator William Nolan based on George Herriman's now famed Krazy Kat newspaper comic strip, licensed by the wife-husband distribution team of Margaret J. Winkler and Charles Mintz. While the Winkler–Mintz operation took Krazy Kat away from FBO the following season for a Paramount contract, they struck a deal with the studio for another series, one that, like Bowers's shorts, involved both animation and a live performer: the Alice Comedies, of which FBO would release over two dozen, were created by two young animators, Ub Iwerks and Walt Disney.

== Sound enters, FBO exits ==
FBO logo from 1928

The advent of sound film would drastically alter the studio's course: Negotiations that began in late 1927 with the Radio Corporation of America (RCA) on a deal for sound conversion led to the January 1928 announcement that RCA, parent company General Electric, and allied shareholder Westinghouse had purchased a major interest in FBO—the $24 price per share was quadruple what it had been just two years earlier. David Sarnoff, RCA general manager and driving force, took a seat on the FBO board. At the same time, Kennedy had aligned with investment banker Elisha Walker and his firm Blair & Co., which had acquired the small Pathé Exchange studio and a stake in Keith-Albee-Orpheum (KAO), a vaudeville exhibition chain owning approximately one hundred theaters across the United States and affiliated with many more; KAO and Blair & Co. together controlled yet another small studio, Producers Distributing Corporation (PDC), famed director Cecil B. DeMille's outlet and one-time fiefdom, which was now in effect a Pathé subsidiary. In March, nominally acting as an unpaid "special advisor" to Pathé (he would eventually receive 100,000 shares of stock and thousands of dollars in retroactive salary), Kennedy took effective charge of PDC operations, beginning the process of edging DeMille out. Pursuing a vertical integration strategy he had discussed separately with both Sarnoff and Walker, Kennedy and his circle of investors, including Blair & Co., soon acquired working control of KAO and its film production/distribution assets. The establishment of a major studio devoted to all-sound production with the RCA Photophone sound-on-film system was the goal—or, at least, Sarnoff's goal.

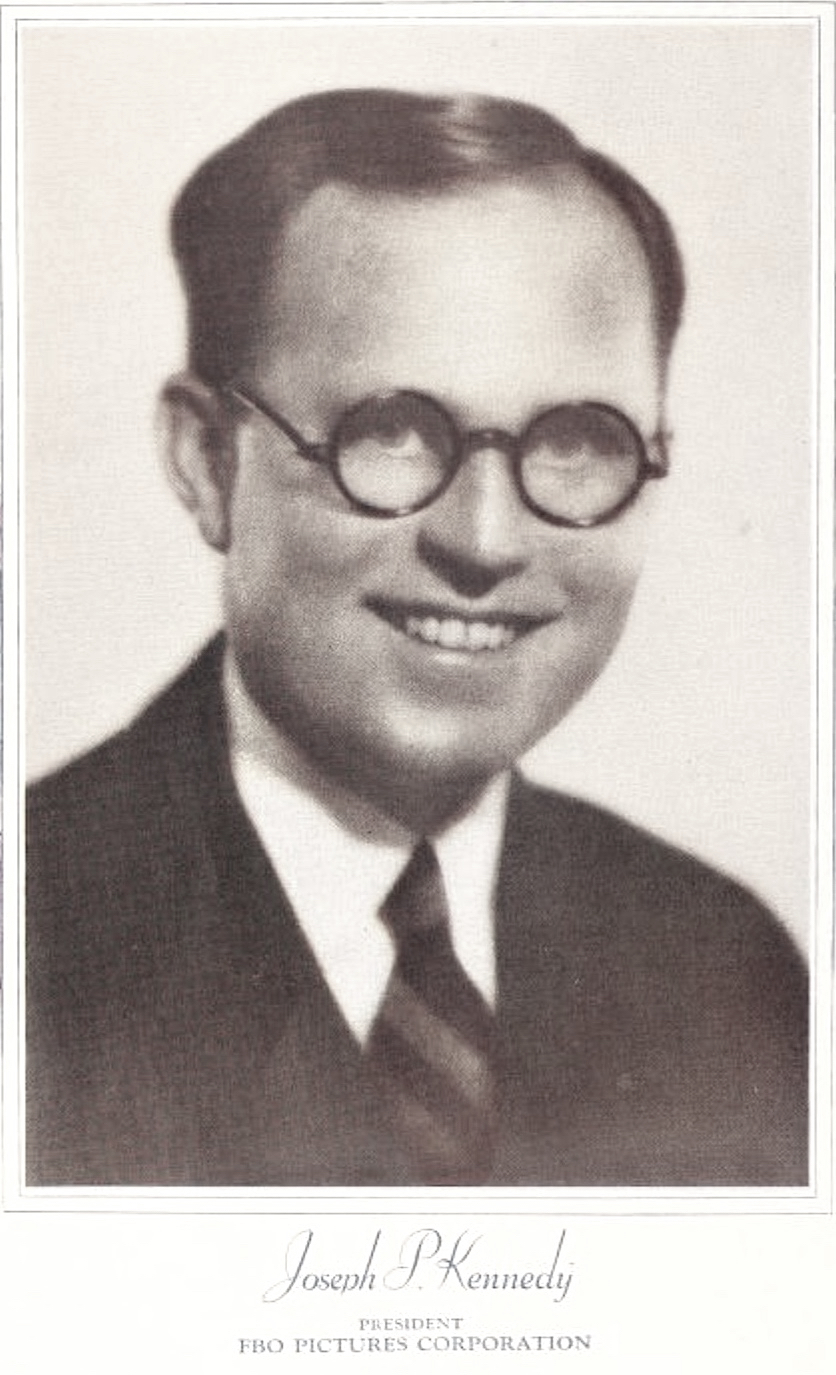
FBO promotion often involved Joseph Kennedy's self-promotion. This image dominated the opening spread of FBO's massive coming attractions insert in the May 19, 1928, Exhibitors Herald.

FBO's The Perfect Crime, starring Clive Brook and Irene Rich, opened on August 4, 1928, at the Rivoli movie palace in Manhattan's Theater District. The first film directed by admired cinematographer Bert Glennon, it was also the first feature-length "talkie" to appear from a studio other than Warner Bros. since the epochal premiere of Warners' The Jazz Singer ten months before. The Perfect Crime had been shot silently in anticipation of a silent release. Using RCA Photophone, dialogue and "mystery sound effects" were dubbed in afterward. Savaging it as a "jabberwocky of inane incidents", the New York Times review concluded, "What it is all about can be called only an open question. A guess at the solution, however, would be that FBO had a mystery story, and in an effort to keep up with the times had synchronized it.... The synchronization is faulty in many, many places, and several vocal selections are added in curious out-of-the-way scenes." A trade paper report described the studio's plans to add "synchronized music, sound effects and dialogue" to five other silently shot films. To date, FBO's experiments with sound had all been funded by RCA; on August 22, as Kennedy was crossing the Atlantic for a European vacation, Variety announced that he had finally signed a formal licensing agreement to pay for his studio's use of Photophone recording. While Kennedy traveled, RCA launched a bid to acquire control of and combine the Keith-Albee-Orpheum chain with FBO, as talks began between Sarnoff and Walker. After his return in late September, Kennedy ultimately agreed to the plan, which would involve his divestiture from both the theater circuit and his own studio.

On October 23, 1928, RCA announced it was merging Film Booking Offices and Keith-Albee-Orpheum to form the new motion picture business Radio-Keith-Orpheum (RKO), with Sarnoff as chairman. Kennedy, who retained management of Pathé and its former PDC assets, made over $4 million in profit from converting and selling off his FBO and KAO stock in the deal (plus a straight $150,000 payout for "facilitating" it). Ranking FBO vice-president Joseph I. Schnitzer replaced Kennedy as president, a position he would retain with RKO Productions when it formally replaced FBO after the turn of the year. William LeBaron, the last FBO production chief, likewise retained his position after the merger, but the new studio, dedicated to full sound production, cut ties with FBO's roster of silent screen performers. In its final year of operation, of FBO's top five box office films according to theater owners, three were again Gene Stratton-Porter adaptations, including The Keeper of the Bees, first released in October 1925 and making its fourth appearance in the annual balloting; the others were the Austrian import Moon of Israel and The Great Mail Robbery. During the transitional period, the first RKO feature release, Syncopation in March 1929, was packaged to exhibitors with two FBO low-budget "programmers". Movies that Film Booking Offices had either produced or arranged to distribute were released under the FBO banner through the end of the year. The last official FBO production to reach American theaters was Pals of the Prairie, directed by Louis King and starring Buzz Barton and Frank Rice, released July 7, 1929.

== Sources ==
- Ankerich, Michael G. (2010). Dangerous Curves atop Hollywood Heels: The Lives, Careers, and Misfortunes of 14 Hard-Luck Girls of the Silent Screen. Duncan, OK: BearManor Media. ISBN 978-1-59393-605-1
- Armstrong, Richard (2007). "James W. Horne," in The Rough Guide to Film, by Richard Armstrong, Tom Charity, Lloyd Hughes, and Jessica Winter. London: Rough Guides, p. 210. ISBN 978-1-84353-408-2
- Armstrong, Richard B., and Mary Williams Armstrong (2001). Encyclopedia of Film Themes, Settings and Series. Jefferson, NC: McFarland. ISBN 978-0-7864-4572-1
- Barrier, Michael (2003). Hollywood Cartoons: American Animation in Its Golden Age. New York: Oxford University Press. ISBN 0-19-516729-5
- Barrier, Michael (2008). The Animated Man: A Life of Walt Disney. Berkeley: University of California Press. ISBN 978-0-520-25619-4
- Beauchamp, Cari (1998). Without Lying Down: Frances Marion and the Powerful Women of Early Hollywood. Berkeley, Los Angeles, and London: University of California Press. ISBN 0-520-21492-7
- Beauchamp, Cari (2009). Joseph P. Kennedy Presents: His Hollywood Years. New York: Knopf. ISBN 978-1-4000-4000-1
- Birchard, Robert S. (1993). King Cowboy: Tom Mix and the Movies. Burbank, CA: Riverwood Press. ISBN 978-1-880756-05-8
- Block, Alex Ben, and Lucy Autrey Wilson, eds. (2010). George Lucas's Blockbusting: A Decade-by-Decade Survey of Timeless Movies Including Untold Secrets of Their Financial and Cultural Success. New York: HarperCollins. ISBN 978-0-06-177889-6
- Boggs, Johnny D. (2011). Jesse James and the Movies. Jefferson, NC: McFarland. ISBN 978-0-7864-4788-6
- Buehrer, Beverley Bare (1993). Boris Karloff: A Bio-Bibliography. Westport, CT: Greenwood Press. ISBN 0-313-27715-X
- Christgau, John (1999). The Origins of the Jump Shot: Eight Men Who Shook the World of Basketball. Lincoln: University of Nebraska Press. ISBN 0-8032-6394-5
- Codori, Jeff (2020). Film History through Trade Journal Art, 1916–1920. Jefferson, NC: McFarland. ISBN 978-1-4766-7617-3
- Connelly, Robert B. (1998). The Silents: Silent Feature Films, 1910–36. Chicago: December Press. ISBN 978-0-913204-36-8
- Corneau, Ernest N. (1969). The Hall of Fame of Western Film Stars. Hanover, MA: Christopher Publishing House. ISBN 0-8158-0124-6
- Crafton, Donald (1993). Before Mickey: The Animated Film, 1898–1928. Chicago and London: University of Chicago Press. ISBN 0-226-11667-0
- Crafton, Donald (1997). The Talkies: American Cinema's Transition to Sound, 1926–1931. New York: Charles Scribner's Sons. ISBN 0-684-19585-2
- Davies, Wallace Evan (1971). "Frederick, Pauline," in Notable American Women, 1607–1950: A Biographical Dictionary, ed. Edward T. James. Cambridge, MA, and London: Belknap Press of Harvard University Press. ISBN 0-674-62734-2
- Ellis, Don Carlos, and Laura Thornborough (1923). Motion Pictures in Education: A Practical Handbook for Users of Visual Aids. New York: Thomas V. Crowell.
- Erickson, Hal (2020). A Van Beuren Production: A History of the 619 Cartoons, 875 Live Action Shorts, Four Feature Films, and One Serial of Amedee Van Beuren. Jefferson, NC: McFarland. ISBN 978-1-4766-8027-9
- Everson, William K. (1998). American Silent Film. New York: Da Capo. ISBN 0-306-80876-5
- Fenton, James W. (2002). Edgar Rice Burroughs and Tarzan: A Biography of the Author and His Creation. Jefferson, NC: McFarland. ISBN 0-7864-1393-X
- Finkielman, Jorge (2004). The Film Industry in Argentina: An Illustrated Cultural History. Jefferson, NC: McFarland. ISBN 0-7864-1628-9
- Finler, Joel W. (1988). The Hollywood Story. New York: Crown. ISBN 0-517-56576-5
- Firestone, Bruce M. (2010 [1982]). "Fred Thomson," in American Classic Screen Profiles, ed. John C. Tibbetts and James M. Welsh. Lanham, MD: Firestone Press, p. 73–77. ISBN 978-0-8108-7677-4
- Fleming, E. J. (2007). Wallace Reid: The Life and Death of a Hollywood Idol. Jefferson, NC: McFarland. ISBN 978-0-7864-7725-8
- Foote, Lisle (2014). Buster Keaton's Crew: The Team Behind His Silent Films. Jefferson, NC: McFarland. ISBN 978-0-7864-9683-9
- Freese, Gene Scott (2014). Hollywood Stunt Performers, 1910s–1970s: A Biographical Dictionary, 2nd ed. Jefferson, NC: McFarland. ISBN 978-0-7864-7643-5
- Gates, Philippa (2019). Criminalization/Assimilation: Chinese/Americans and Chinatowns in Classical Hollywood Film. New Brunswick, NJ: Rutgers University Press. ISBN 978-0-8135-8942-8
- Goodwin, Doris Kearns (1987). The Fitzgeralds and the Kennedys: An American Saga. New York: Simon & Schuster. ISBN 0-671-23108-1
- Heritage Vintage Movie Poster Signature Auction #603. Dallas: Heritage Vintage Movie Posters, 2004a. ISBN 1-932899-15-4
- Heritage Vintage Movie Poster Signature Auction #607. Dallas: Heritage Vintage Movie Posters, 2004b. ISBN 1-932899-35-9
- Heritage Vintage Movie Poster Signature Auction #624. Dallas: Heritage Vintage Movie Posters, 2005. ISBN 1-59967-004-6
- Jackson, Kenneth T., Karen Markoe, and Arnie Markoe (1998). The Scribner Encyclopedia of American Lives, vol. 1: 1981–1985. New York: Charles Scribner's Sons. ISBN 978-0-68480-492-7
- Jensen, Richard D. (2005). The Amazing Tom Mix: The Most Famous Cowboy of the Movies. Lincoln, NE: iUniverse. ISBN 978-0-595-35949-3
- Jewell, Richard B. (2012). RKO Radio Pictures: A Titan Is Born. Berkeley and Los Angeles: University of California Press. ISBN 978-0-520-27178-4
- Jewell, Richard B., with Vernon Harbin (1982). The RKO Story. New York: Arlington House/Crown. ISBN 0-517-54656-6
- Katchmer, George A. (1991). Eighty Silent Film Stars: Biographies and Filmographies of the Obscure to the Well Known. Jefferson, NC: McFarland. ISBN 978-0-89950-494-0
- Katchmer, George A. (2002). A Biographical Dictionary of Silent Film Western Actors and Actresses. Jefferson, NC: McFarland. ISBN 978-0-7864-4693-3
- Kear, Lynn, with James King (2009). Evelyn Brent: The Life and Films of Hollywood's Lady Crook. Jefferson, NC: McFarland. ISBN 978-0-7864-4363-5
- Kemp, Philip (1987). "Curtiz, Michael," in World Film Directors, Volume 1: 1890–1945, ed. John Wakeman. New York: H. W. Wilson, pp. 172–81. ISBN 0-8242-0757-2
- Koszarski, Richard (1990). An Evening's Entertainment: The Age of the Silent Feature Picture, 1915–1928. Berkeley, Los Angeles, and London: University of California Press. ISBN 0-520-08535-3
- Langer, Mark (1995). "John Randolph Bray: Animation Pioneer," in American Silent Film: Discovering Marginalized Voices, ed. Gregg Bachman and Thomas J. Slater. Carbondale: Southern Illinois Univ. Press (2002), pp. 94–114. ISBN 0-8093-2402-4
- Langman, Larry (1998). American Film Cycles: The Silent Era. Westport, CT: Greenwood Press. ISBN 0-313-30657-5
- Lasky, Betty (1989). RKO: The Biggest Little Major of Them All. Santa Monica, CA: Roundtable. ISBN 0-915677-41-5
- Liebman, Roy (2017). Broadway Actors in Films, 1894–2015. Jefferson, NC: McFarland. ISBN 978-0-7864-7685-5
- Long, Harry H (2012). "Avenging Conscience," in American Silent Horror, Science Fiction and Fantasy Feature Films, 1913–1929, vol. 1, by John T. Soister and Henry Nicolella, with Steve Joyce and Harry H Long. Jefferson, NC: McFarland, pp. 16–21. ISBN 978-0-7864-3581-4
- Louvish, Simon (2001). Stan and Ollie: The Roots of Comedy: The Double Life of Laurel and Hardy. New York: St. Martin's. ISBN 0-312-26651-0
- Lupack, Barbara Tepa (2020). Silent Serial Sensations: The Wharton Brothers and the Magic of Early Cinema. Ithaca, NY: Cornell University Press. ISBN 978-1-5017-4818-9
- Lussier, Tim (2018). "Bare Knees" Flapper: The Life and Films of Virginia Lee Corbin. Jefferson, NC: McFarland. ISBN 978-1-4766-7568-8
- Lyons, Timothy James (1974 [1972]). The Silent Partner: The History of the American Film Manufacturing Company, 1910–1921. New York: Arno Press. ISBN 0-405-04872-6
- Maurice, Alice (2013). The Cinema and Its Shadow: Race and Technology in Early Cinema. Minneapolis: University of Minnesota Press. ISBN 978-1-4529-3939-1
- Mayer, Geoff (2017). Encyclopedia of American Serials. Jefferson, NC:: McFarland. ISBN 978-0-7864-7762-3
- McCaffrey, Donald W., and Christopher P. Jacobs (1999). Guide to the Silent Years of American Cinema. Westport, CT: Greenwood Press. ISBN 0-313-30345-2
- Miyao, Daisuke (2007). Sessue Hayakawa: Silent Cinema and Transnational Stardom. Durham, NC, and London: Duke University Press. ISBN 978-0-8223-3958-8
- Morton, Ray (2005). King Kong: The History of a Movie Icon from Fay Wray to Peter Jackson. New York: Applause. ISBN 1-55783-669-8
- Munden, Kenneth W. (1971). The American Film Institute Catalog of Motion Pictures Produced in the United States: Feature Films, 1921–1930. Berkeley, Los Angeles, and London: University of California Press. ISBN 0-520-20969-9
- Nasaw, David (2012). The Patriarch: The Remarkable Life and Turbulent Times of Joseph P. Kennedy. New York: Penguin Press. ISBN 978-1-59420-376-3
- Nollen, Scott Allen (1991). Boris Karloff: A Critical Account of His Screen, Stage, Radio, Television. Jefferson, NC: Mcfarland. ISBN 0-89950-580-5
- Okuda, James L., and James L. Neibaur (2012). Stan Without Ollie: The Stan Laurel Solo Films, 1917–1927. Jefferson, NC: McFarland. ISBN 978-0-7864-4781-7
- Quirk, Lawrence J. (1996). The Kennedys in Hollywood. Dallas: Taylor Publishing. ISBN 978-0-87833-934-1
- Rainey, Buck (1987). Heroes of the Range. Metuchen, NJ: Scarecrow Press. ISBN 978-0-8108-1804-0
- Rainey, Buck (1999). Serials and Series: A World Filmography, 1912–1956. Jefferson, NC:: McFarland. ISBN 978-0-7864-4702-2
- Sandburg, Carl (1925). "White Fang," in The Movies Are: Carl Sandburg's Film Reviews and Essays, 1920–1928, ed. Arnie Bernstein. Chicago: Lake Claremont Press (2000), pp. 270–71. ISBN 1-893121-05-4
- Schaefer, Eric (1999). "Bold! Daring! Shocking! True!": A History of Exploitation Films, 1919–1959. Durham, NC, and London: Duke University Press. ISBN 0-8223-2374-5
- Sherwood, Robert Emmet (1923). The Best Moving Pictures of 1922–23. Boston: Small, Maynard.
- Shiel, Mark (2012). Hollywood Cinema and the Real Los Angeles. London: Reaktion Books. ISBN 978-1-86189-902-6
- Slide, Anthony (2013 [1998]). The New Historical Dictionary of the American Film Industry. Abingdon and New York: Routledge. ISBN 978-1-579-58056-8
- Slide, Anthony (2022 [1996]). The Silent Feminists: America's First Women Directors. Lanham, MD: Rowman & Littlefield. ISBN 978-1-5381-6552-2
- Solomon, Aubrey (2011). The Fox Film Corporation, 1915–1935: A History and Filmography. Jefferson, NC: McFarland. ISBN 978-0-7864-6286-5
- Stumpf, Charles (2010). ZaSu Pitts: The Life and Career. Jefferson, NC: McFarland. ISBN 978-0-7864-4620-9
- Sweeney, Kevin W., ed. (2007). Buster Keaton Interviews. Jackson: University Press of Mississippi. ISBN 978-1-57806-962-0
- Taves, Brian. (2012). Thomas Ince: Hollywood's Independent Pioneer. Lexington: University Press of Kentucky. ISBN 978-0-8131-3422-2
- Valderrama, Carla (2020). This Was Hollywood: Forgotten Stars and Stories. New York: Hachette. ISBN 978-0-7624-9586-3
- Wing, Ruth, ed. (1924). The Blue Book of the Screen. Hollywood, CA: Blue Book of the Screen Inc.
