= The Glorious Lady =

1919 film

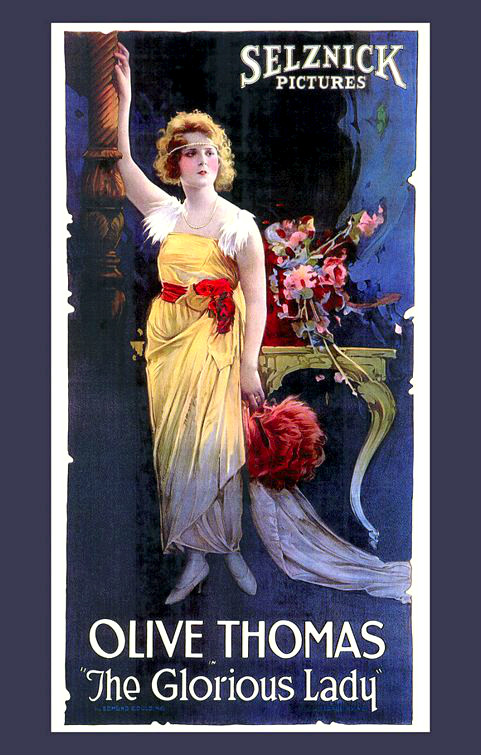
- Film poster
- Directed by: George Irving
- Written by: George M. Arthur; Edmund Goulding
- Produced by: Lewis J. Selznick
- Starring: Olive Thomas
- Cinematography: Lewis W. Physioc
- Production company: Selznick Pictures
- Release date: October 19, 1919
- Running time: Five reels
- Country: United States
- Language: Silent (English intertitles)

The Glorious Lady

The Glorious Lady is a 1919 American silent drama film directed by George Irving. A copy of the film survives in the Nederlands Filmmuseum.

== Cast ==
- Olive Thomas as Ivis Benson
- Matt Moore as The Duke of Loame
- Evelyn Brent as Lady Eileen
- Robert Taber as Dr. Neuman (*this Robert Taber is not the stage actor died 1904)
- Huntley Gordon as Lord Chettington
- Marie Burke as Dowager Duchess
- Mrs. Henry Clive as Hilda Neuman
- Mona Kingsley as Babette
