= The Spite Bride =

1919 film

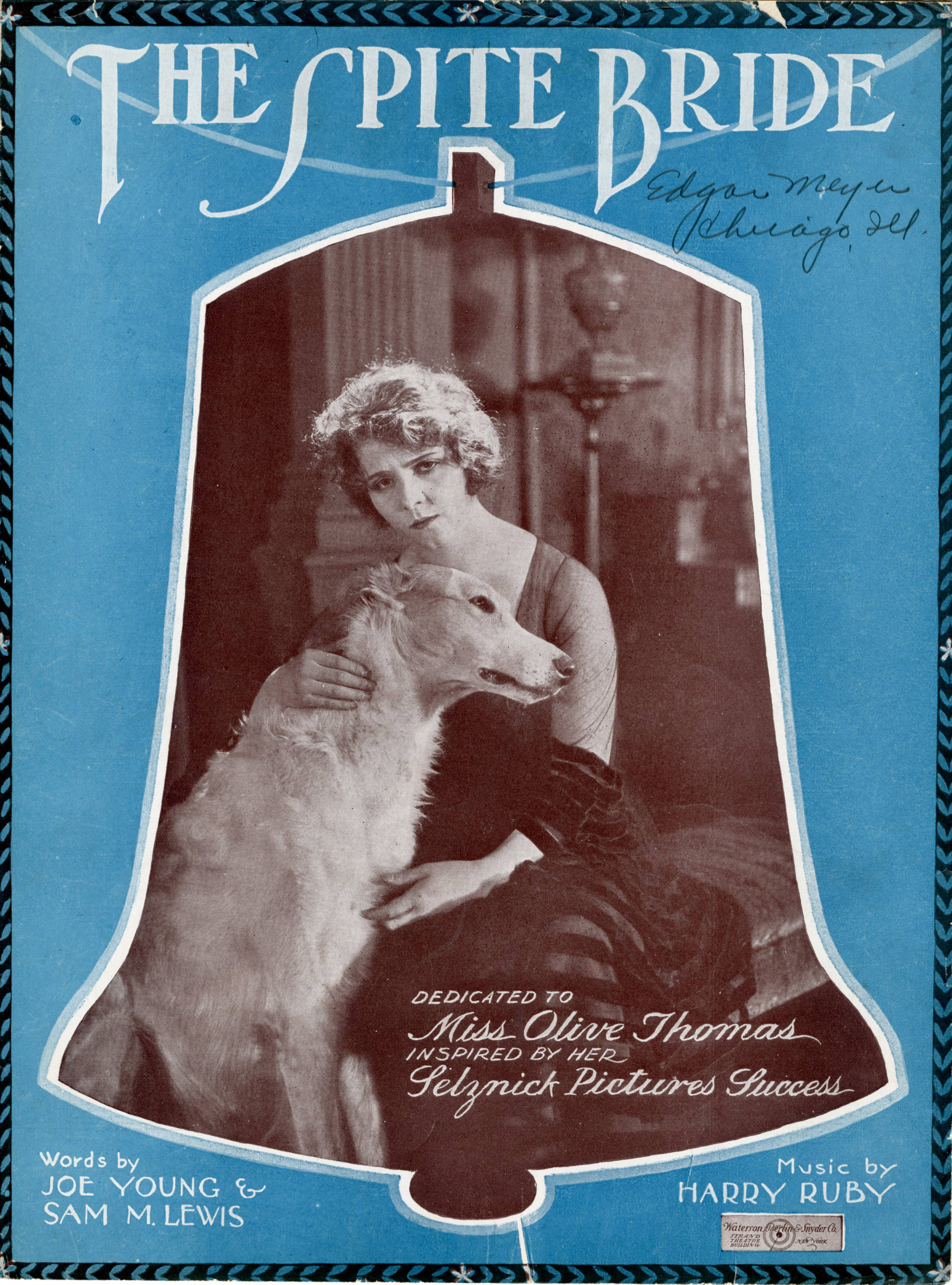
- Directed by: Charles Giblyn
- Written by: Louise Winter (novel); Lillian Ducey
- Produced by: Lewis J. Selznick; Myron Selznick
- Starring: Olive Thomas; Robert Ellis; Jack Mulhall
- Cinematography: Lewis W. Physioc
- Production company: Selznick Pictures
- Distributed by: Selznick Pictures
- Release date: September 21, 1919
- Running time: 50 minutes
- Country: United States
- Languages: Silent; English intertitles

The Spite Bride is a 1919 American silent drama film directed by Charles Giblyn and starring Olive Thomas, Robert Ellis and Jack Mulhall.

== Cast ==
- Olive Thomas as Tessa Doyle
- Robert Ellis as Billy Swayne
- Jack Mulhall as Rodney Dolson
- Claire Du Brey as Trixie Dennis
- Irene Rich as Eileen Moore
- Dorothy Wallace as Millicent Lee
- Lamar Johnstone as Arthur Derford
- Katherine Griffith as Countess di Raspoli
- Molly Malone as Vaudevillian

== Preservation ==
- The film is preserved at Archives Du Film Du CNC, Bois d'Arcy.

== Bibliography ==
- Connelly, Robert B. The Silents: Silent Feature Films, 1910-36, Volume 40, Issue 2. December Press, 1998.
- Munden, Kenneth White. The American Film Institute Catalog of Motion Pictures Produced in the United States, Part 1. University of California Press, 1997.
