= Lewis Physioc =

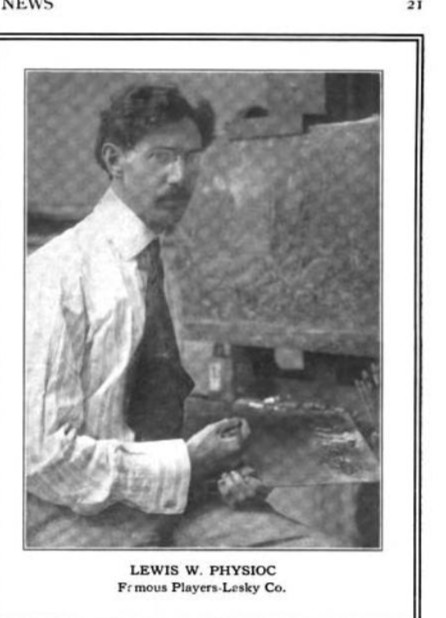
Lewis Physioc in 1917

Lewis Wood Physioc (June 30, 1879 – January 16, 1972) was a cinematographer, matte artist, and painter in the United States. After his film career he taught film at USC in Los Angeles. He was the older brother of Wray Physioc.

Physioc wrote about film technique. He was affiliated with the American Society of Cinematographers.

== Filmography ==
- Rolling Stones (film) (1916)
- The Kiss (1916 film)
- A Coney Island Princess (1916) by Edward Sheldon starring Irene Fenwick and Owen Moore
- The Long Trail (film) (1917)
- Bab's Burglar (1917)
- Seven Keys to Baldpate (1917 film) starring George M. Cohan and Anna Q. Nilsson with cinematography by Ned Van Buren and Physioc
- A Girl Like That (1917)
- The Antics of Ann (1917)
- Bab's Diary (1917) starring Marguerite Clark
- The Claw (1918)
- Upstairs and Down (1919) starring Olive Thomas, David Butler, and Robert Ellis (actor, born 1892)
- The Glorious Lady (1919)
- The Spite Bride (1919)
- The No-Gun Man (1924)
- The Millionaire Cowboy (1924)
- Western Limited (1932) starring Estelle Taylor, Edmund Burns, and Lucien Prival
- Midnight Patrol
- The Beast of Borneo (1934)
