= Youthful Folly (1920 film) =

1920 film

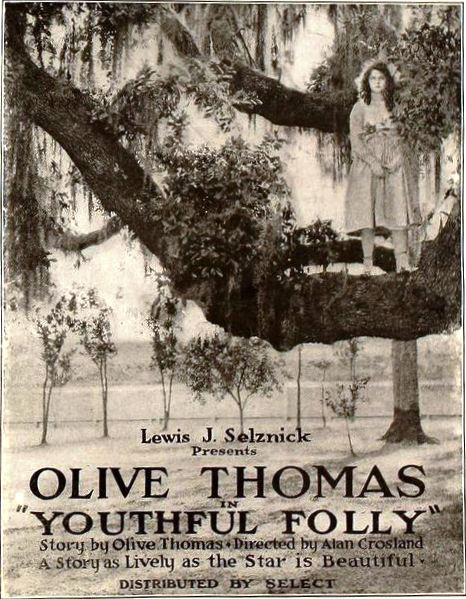
- Directed by: Alan Crosland
- Written by: John Lynch; Olive Thomas
- Produced by: Lewis J. Selznick
- Starring: Olive Thomas; Crauford Kent; Helen Gill
- Cinematography: Jules Cronjager
- Production company: Selznick Pictures
- Distributed by: Select Pictures
- Release date: March 8, 1920
- Running time: 50 minutes
- Country: United States
- Language: Silent (English intertitles)

Youthful Folly is a lost 1920 American silent drama film directed by Alan Crosland and starring Olive Thomas, Crauford Kent, and Helen Gill.

== Cast ==
- Olive Thomas as Nancy Sherwin
- Crauford Kent as David Montgomery
- Helen Gill as Lola Ainsley
- Hugh Huntley as Jimsy Blake
- Charles Craig as Reverend Bluebottle
- Howard Truesdale as Jonathan Ainsley
- Florida Kingsley as Aunt Martha
- Eugenie Woodward as Aunt Jenny
- Pauline Dempsey as Mammy

== Bibliography ==
- Monaco, James. The Encyclopedia of Film. Perigee Books, 1991.
