= Upstairs and Down =

1919 film by Charles Giblyn

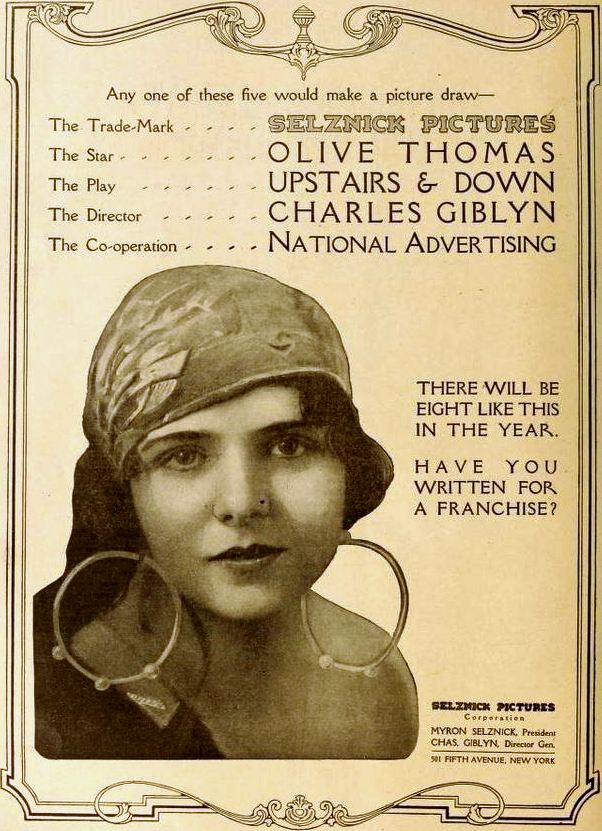
- Ad for film
- Directed by: Charles Giblyn
- Written by: Lillian Ducey (scenario)
- Based on: Upstairs and Down by Frederick and Fanny Hatton
- Produced by: Myron Selznick
- Starring: Olive Thomas; David Butler; Robert Ellis; Rosemary Theby
- Cinematography: Lewis W. Physioc
- Production company: Selznick Pictures
- Distributed by: Selznick Pictures
- Release date: June 9, 1919
- Running time: 50 mins.
- Country: United States
- Language: Silent (English intertitles)
- Box office: $74,093

Upstairs and Down is a 1919 American silent comedy film directed by Charles Giblyn, and starring Olive Thomas, Rosemary Theby, David Butler, and Robert Ellis. It is based on the 1916 play of the same name by Frederick and Fanny Hatton. Upstairs and Down is now presumed lost.

== Plot ==
Alice Chesterton and her fiancé Tom Carey are members of a Long Island "millionaire smart set". Alice is considered to be a "baby vamp" by her friends and soon grows bored of her practical and unromantic fiancé Tom Carey. To amuse herself, she begins flirting with men who she finds exciting. During a house party at the Long Island home of the couple's friends The Ives, Alice meets Terence O'Keefe, an Irish polo playing playboy who is visiting the United States to buy horses for the British Army. The two soon began seeing each other. Mrs. Ives gets wind of the affair and encourages Alice's sister Betty to talk some sense into Alice.

In an effort to distract Terrance from Alice, Betty stages an automobile accident that Terrance is sure to stumble upon. Terrance discovers the wreck and finds an unconscious Betty whom he revives with a kiss. The two quickly fall in love and soon plan to marry. When Alice gets wind of Betty and Terrance's plan, she becomes jealous. To break the couple up, Alice tells Betty that Terrance has "ruined" her. After Betty confronts Terrance with Alice's claim, Alice admits that she was not being truthful. Meanwhile, Terrance has been advising Tom about how to win Alice back. Terrance encourages Tom to be more passionate and forceful with Alice which ultimately wins her back.

== Cast ==
- Olive Thomas as Alice Chesterton
- Rosemary Theby as Betty Chesterton
- David Butler as Tom Carey
- Robert Ellis as Terrence O'Keefe
- Mary Charleson as Rosalie
- Andrew Robson as Sprang

== Production and reception ==
Upstairs and Down was the first film Olive Thomas made for the newly formed Selznick Pictures Corporation. Thomas had been a popular star of the Ziegfeld Follies and parlayed that popularity into a successful film career with Triangle. After her contract with Triangle expired, Thomas signed with Myron and David Selznick's company for a reported $2,500 a week. To promote their new star and her first picture for the company, the Selznicks spared no expense. Two electric signs promoting the film and Thomas were erected in Times Square and tie-ins were also used to promote the film. A song written for the film (also titled "Upstairs and Down") was released and featured Thomas' photo on the cover of the sheet music.

The film was generally well received by critics who also noted it would likely be received better in large cities that had "moderately sophisticated" audiences because the film had "worldly wise attitude" character. Upstairs and Down eventually grossed $74,093.
