= The Flapper =

1920 American silent comedy film

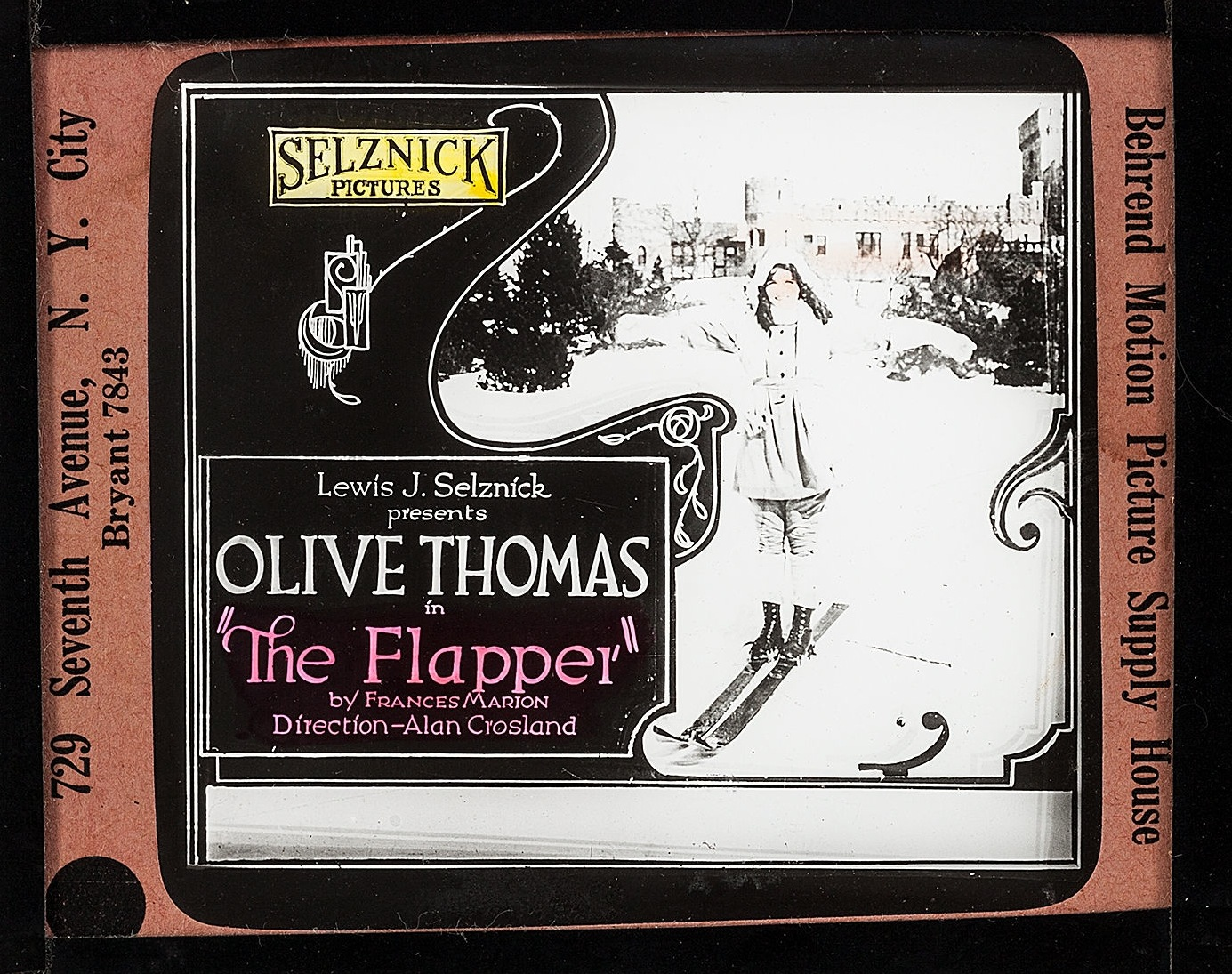
- Glass slide for the film
- Directed by: Alan Crosland
- Screenplay by: Frances Marion
- Story by: Frances Marion
- Produced by: Myron Selznick
- Starring: Olive Thomas; Warren Cook
- Cinematography: John W. Brown
- Production company: Selznick Pictures
- Distributed by: Select Pictures
- Release date: May 10, 1920 (United States)
- Running time: 88 minutes
- Country: United States
- Language: Silent (English intertitles)

The Flapper is a 1920 American silent comedy film starring Olive Thomas. Directed by Alan Crosland, the film was the first in the United States to portray the "flapper" lifestyle, which became a cultural craze or fad in the 1920s.

== Plot ==
Sixteen-year-old Genevieve 'Ginger' King is living in a very wealthy family in the boring town of Orange Springs, Florida with her younger siblings, where her unchaperoned decision to drink a soda with a young male is considered scandalous. Because of her questionable behavior and yearning for a more excitable life, Ginger's father decides to send her to a boarding school in Lake Placid, New York. Mrs. Paddles' School for Young Ladies is administered by the strict disciplinarian, Mrs. Paddles.

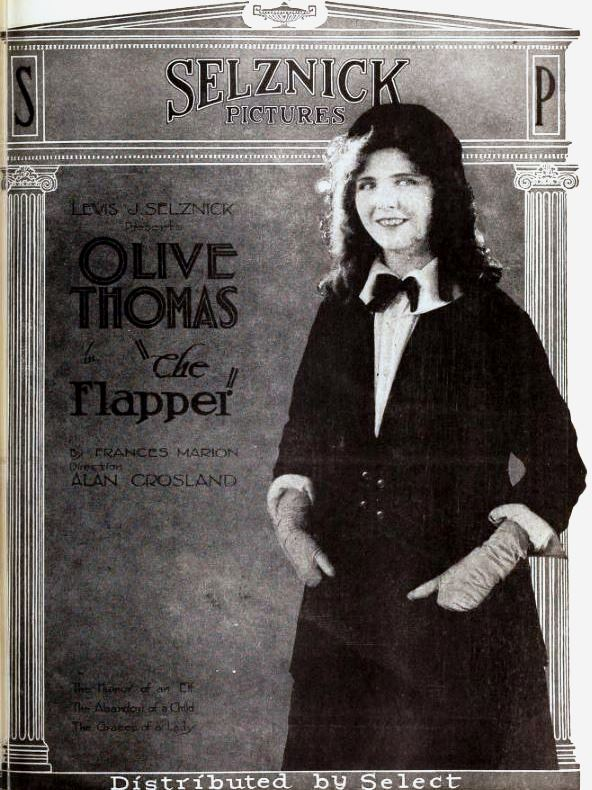
Contemporary advertisement for The Flapper. May 8, 1920

Despite the strictness there, the girls have fun getting into flapper-lifestyle trouble including flirting. Richard Channing, an older man, rides past the seminary every day, prompting romantic fantasies among the schoolgirls. When Ginger connives a sleigh ride with Channing, she lies to him about her age, saying she is "about twenty". Ginger is quickly charmed and becomes enamored with him. Ginger soon gets into trouble with the headmistress by sneaking out to the local country club where Channing is having a party. One of her schoolmates, Hortense, who is described as “a moth among the butterflies”, informs on her. Hortense’s actual motive for doing this is to get the headmistress out of the way so she can rob the school's safe and flee with her crooked boyfriend Thomas Morran. Acting on a vaguely worded note she receives, Ginger—while traveling home from school—goes to a hotel in New York City where Hortense and Thomas are staying. They force her to take some suitcases for safekeeping, cases that contain stolen valuables, including fancy clothes and jewelry.

Knowing that Channing has gone to Orange Springs on a yachting trip, Ginger decides to use the clothes and jewels to present herself as a more mature, well-dressed “woman of experience” when she returns home. Her plan backfires, and her father believes she is lying when she says it is all a joke. Detectives then show up wanting to know why she has stolen loot; and both her young admirer Bill and Channing think she has really become a wicked woman. Hortense and her crooked boyfriend now turn up in Orange Springs to reclaim their ill-gotten loot. Their subsequent capture by the police clears Ginger's name and restores her reputation.

The Flapper

The events in the lives of Ginger King and another character are presented as incidents in a (non-fiction) newsreel at the end of the movie.

== Cast ==
- Olive Thomas as Ginger King
- Warren Cook as Senator King
- Theodore Westman, Jr. as Bill Forbes
- Katherine Johnston as Hortense
- Arthur Housman as Tom Morran
- Louise Lindroth as Elmina Buttons
- Charles Craig as Reverend Cushil
- William P. Carleton as Richard Channing
- Marcia Harris as Mrs. Paddles
- Bobby Connelly as King, Jr.
- Athole Shearer as Extra (uncredited)
- Norma Shearer as Schoolgirl (uncredited)

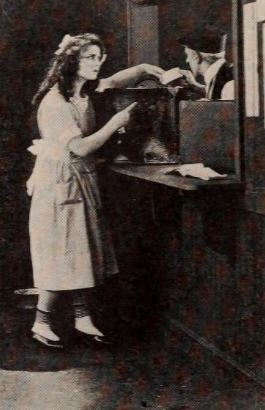
The Flapper, 1920

== Production notes ==
- Frances Marion wrote the screenplay, which is credited with popularizing the slang term “flapper” throughout the United States in the 1920s.
- Olive Thomas appeared in only two films after The Flapper. She died in Paris in September 1920.

== Reception ==
The Film Daily gave it an overall positive review on May 23, 1920, praising the acting of Olive Thomas. Its main criticism was regarding the editing and the conclusion of the film, writing that the story was "cleverly written with many amusing situations, but latter reels should be compressed".

== Copyright status and home media ==
The Flapper, originally a “six-reeler”, is no longer under copyright and is now in the public domain. In 2005, The Flapper was released on Region 1 DVD by the Milestone Collection as part of The Olive Thomas Collection.
