= Michelle Vogel =

Australian-born film historian

Michelle Vogel (born 1972) is an Australian-born film historian, author and free-lance editor. Vogel has written biographies of Gene Tierney, Marjorie Main, Olive Thomas, Olive Borden, Lupe Vélez, Joan Crawford, and Marilyn Monroe, as well as two compilations 'Children of Hollywood Accounts of Growing up as Sons and Daughters of Stars' and 'Hollywood Blondes Golden Girls of the Silver Screen'. She has also written a children's book entitled 'Three Twisted Tales'.

Vogel has lived in Brooklyn, New York City and in Victoria, Australia.

== Books ==
- Gene Tierney: A Biography, published 22 Mar 2005, 15 Mar 2011, by McFarland & Company.
- Marjorie Main ~ The Life and Films of Hollywood's "Ma Kettle", published 1 Dec 2005, 15 Jun 2011, by McFarland.
- Children Of Hollywood ~ Accounts Of Growing Up As The Sons And Daughters Of Stars, published 31 Jul 2005 by McFarland.
- Olive Thomas ~ The Life and Death of a Silent Film Beauty, published 15 Jun 2007 by McFarland.
- Joan Crawford: Her Life in Letters, published 10 May 2005, by Wasteland Press.
- Olive Borden: The Life and Films of Hollywood's "Joy Girl", published 15 Apr 2010 by McFarland. ISBN 978-0-7864-4795-4
- Lupe Velez: The Life and Career of Hollywood's "Mexican Spitfire", published 31 Jan 2006, 15 Jul 2012, by McFarland, Print ISBN 978-0-7864-6139-4, Ebook ISBN 978-0-7864-8997-8
- Marilyn Monroe Her Films, Her Life, published 31 Dec 2013, 28 Feb 2014, by McFarland.
- Holywood Blondes Golden Girls of the Silver Screen, published 1 Mar 2007, by Wasteland Press.
- Three Twisted Tales, published 9 Apr 2007 by Wasteland Press.
