= A Girl Like That (film) =

1917 American drama silent film

- Directed by: Dell Henderson
- Screenplay by: Paul West; Roswell Dague
- Produced by: Daniel Frohman
- Starring: Irene Fenwick; Owen Moore; Thomas O'Keefe; Eddie Sturgis; Harry Lee; John T. Dillon
- Cinematography: Lewis W. Physioc
- Production company: Famous Players Film Company
- Distributed by: Paramount Pictures
- Release date: January 18, 1917
- Running time: 50 minutes
- Country: United States
- Language: English

A Girl Like That is a 1917 American silent drama film directed by Dell Henderson and written by Paul West and Roswell Dague. The film stars Irene Fenwick, Owen Moore, Thomas O'Keefe, Eddie Sturgis, Harry Lee and John T. Dillon. The film was released on January 18, 1917, by Paramount Pictures.

The film is now lost.

== Plot ==
Nell Gordon is unfortunate in her ancestry; her father is a crook, but she possesses qualities of resourcefulness and loyalty. Though she love her father, she detests his associates, particularly Bill Whipple, who is her constant suitor. Joe Dunham, who does the scouting for the trio, finds a likely bank in the town of Wheaton, the fact that a new bookkeeper is needed there opening a way for the gang to get into the bank, as Nell is an expert. Working on her love for her father, who is a very sick man, Whipple and Dunham persuade Nell to go to Wheaton and take the position.

Boarding with Rev. Dr. Singleton, Nell wins the confidence of Jim Brooks, the cashier of the bank, and of Tom Hoadley, his best friend, sheriff of the county. She's working there to find the combination of the safe, but before she even has a good chance to look, she starts to realize that she is in love with the cashier. On the very day that she learns and copies the combination, Jim proposes to her; after a mental struggle, she decides that her love for him is greater than her loyalty to the gang, and she surrenders, concealing her identity (she had come to the town under an assumed name).

Becoming suspicious of Nell's delay in sending word to them, Whipple and Dunham attempt to force her father to write a note ordering her to act quickly, but the old man refuses and is shot. The crooks go to Wheaton and try to force Nell to rob the bank. She has undergone a complete reformation and even confessed her identity to Jim's friend and is planning to leave Wheaton rather than bring disgrace upon the man she loves. When she discovers that the crooks have murdered her father, she plots revenge: appearing to consent to their demands, she gets them into the bank, but not until she has warned the sheriff. She is wounded in the fight that follows, and when she awakens, she is in the arms of the man from whom she attempted to escape because she loved him.

== Cast ==
- Irene Fenwick as Nell Gordon
- Owen Moore as Jim Brooks
- Thomas O'Keefe as Bill Whipple
- Eddie Sturgis as Joe Dunham
- Harry Lee as John Gordon
- John T. Dillon as Tom Hoadley
- Olive Thomas as Fannie Brooks
- William J. Butler as Clergyman
