= Myron Selznick =

American film producer

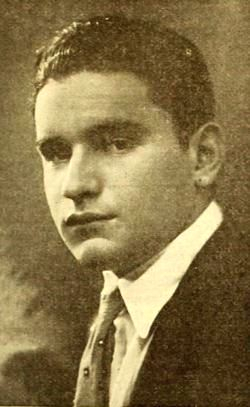
- Selznick in 1919
- Born: October 5, 1898; Pittsburgh, Pennsylvania, U.S.
- Died: March 23, 1944 (aged 45); Santa Monica, California, U.S.
- Resting place: Forest Lawn Memorial Park Cemetery, Glendale, California
- Occupations: Film producer, talent agent
- Spouse: Marjorie Daw (m. 1929; div. 1942)
- Parent(s): Lewis J. Selznick; Florence Sachs
- Relatives: David O. Selznick (brother)

Myron Selznick (October 5, 1898 – March 23, 1944) was an American film producer and talent agent.

== Life and career ==
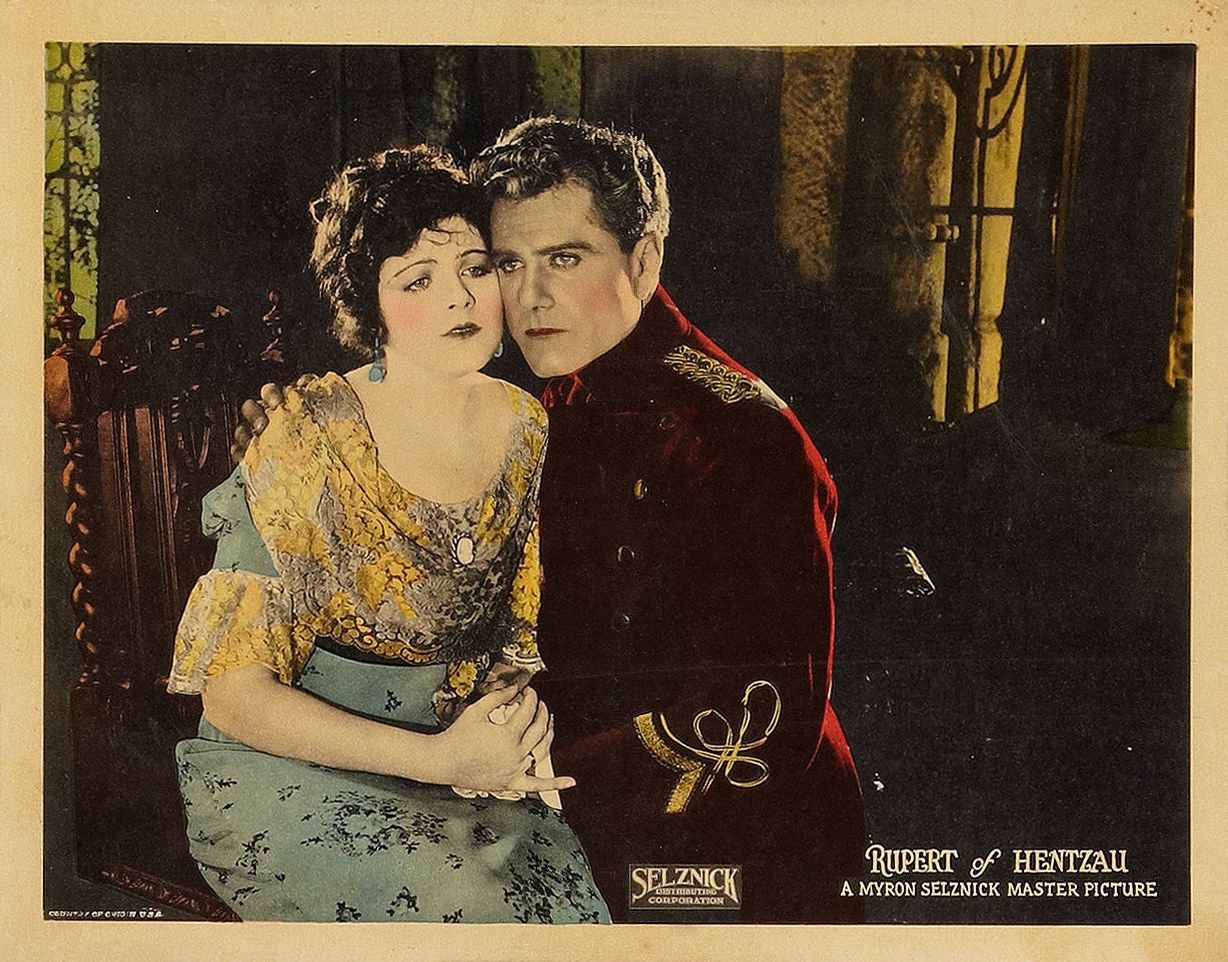
Rupert of Hentzau (1923), one of the films produced by Myron Selznick for Selznick Pictures

Born in Pittsburgh, Pennsylvania, Selznick was the son of film executive Lewis J. Selznick and brother of renowned producer David O. Selznick. As a young man, Myron Selznick learned the film production business from his father and worked for his father's film company as a production supervisor.

In December 1918 while his father's publicity was declining, he signed Olive Thomas for $1,000 a week and put the Selznick name up in lights again. As he was still a minor at the time, his mother had to sign the contract on his behalf.

After his father's company closed in 1925, Selznick worked for other studios, primarily as a production adviser. However, with his industry connections, and aided by his brother's rise as one of the most powerful film producers in Hollywood, he saw a business opportunity and set himself up as a talent agent. Partnered with Frank Coleman Joyce, the brother of actress Alice Joyce, they formed Joyce-Selznick, Ltd., the first Los Angeles talent agency.

The agency became so successful that 20th Century Fox wound up banning him from their lot out of a concern that he was inflating too many actors' salaries.

== Personal life ==
Selznick married Marjorie Daw in 1925; the couple divorced in 1942. He owned the Thoroughbred racehorse "Can't Wait", which finished third in the 1938 Kentucky Derby.

== Death ==
Selznick died in 1944, aged 45, and was buried at Hollywood Memorial Park Cemetery (now the Hollywood Forever Cemetery) in Hollywood near the Paramount and R.K.O. studios. The pallbearers at his funeral included producer Walter Wanger and actor William Powell, who read the funeral oration. Later that year he was disinterred and buried in a crypt at Forest Lawn Memorial Park Cemetery, Glendale, California, where he was later joined by his brother, David.

== Filmography ==
Year	Title	Notes
1919	Upstairs and Down	Film debut
1919	The Spite Bride	
1920	The Flapper	
1922	Reported Missing	
1923	Rupert of Hentzau	
1923	The Common Law	
1926	King of the Saddle	
1927	Topsy and Eva	
1939	Gone With the Wind	Final film
