= Rolling Stones (film) =

1916 American silent film by Dell Henderson

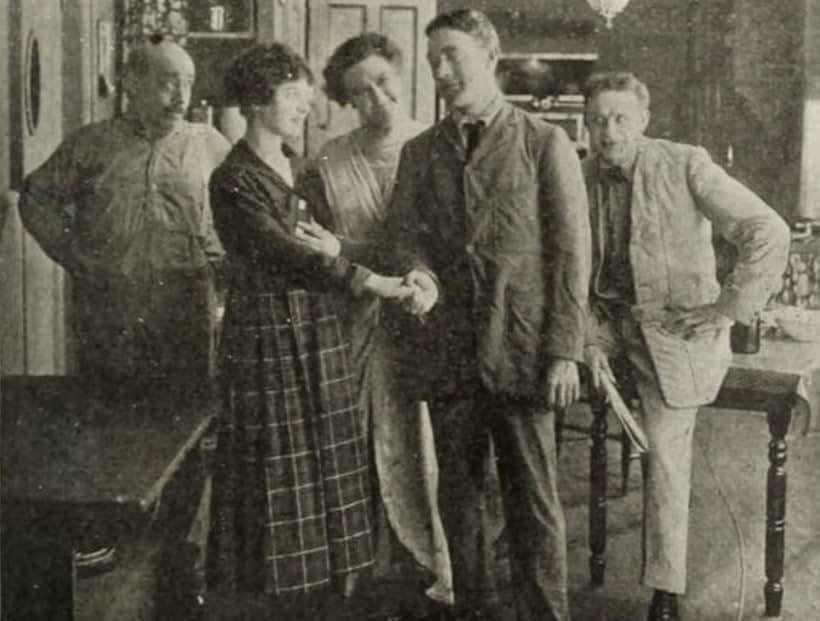
- Directed by: Dell Henderson
- Screenplay by: Edgar Selwyn
- Starring: Owen Moore; Marguerite Courtot; Denman Maley; Alan Hale, Sr. Gretchen Hartman; William J. Butler
- Cinematography: Lewis W. Physioc
- Production company: Famous Players Film Company
- Distributed by: Paramount Pictures
- Release date: August 21, 1916
- Running time: 50 minutes
- Country: United States
- Language: English

Rolling Stones is a 1916 American drama silent film directed by Dell Henderson and written by Edgar Selwyn. The film stars Owen Moore, Marguerite Courtot, Denman Maley, Alan Hale, Sr., Gretchen Hartman and William J. Butler. The film was released on August 23, 1916, by Paramount Pictures. Prints and/or fragments were found in the Dawson Film Find in 1978.

== Cast ==
- Owen Moore as Dave Fulton
- Marguerite Courtot as Norma Noggs
- Denman Maley as Buck Ryder
- Alan Hale, Sr. as Jerry Braden
- Gretchen Hartman as Mrs. Braden
- William J. Butler as Mr. Branigan
- Ida Fitzhugh as Mrs. Branigan
