= Lewis J. Selznick =

American businessman (1869/1870–1933)

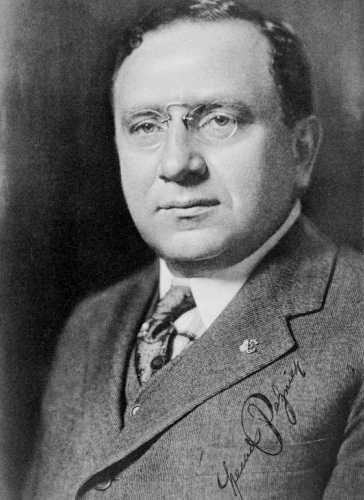
- Born: Lewis Zeleznick; May 2, 1869 or 1870; Anyksciai, Kovno Governorate, Russian Empire
- Died: January 25, 1933 (aged 62 or 63); Los Angeles, California, U.S.
- Occupations: Motion picture producer and distributor
- Years active: 1913–1923
- Spouse: Florence Sachs (m. 1896)
- Children: Myron Selznick; David O. Selznick
- Awards: Walk of Fame - Motion Picture; 6412 Hollywood Blvd

Lewis J. Selznick (born Lewis Zeleznick; May 2, 1870 or 1869 – January 25, 1933) was an American producer in the early years of the film industry. After initial involvement with World Film at Fort Lee, New Jersey, he established Selznick Pictures in California.

== Biography ==
Selznick was born in 1870 in Anyksciai, Kovno Governorate, Russian Empire (now in Lithuania), to Ida (Ringer) and Joseph Zeleznick of a poor Jewish family. Later in his life he claimed that he was born in Kiev (now in Ukraine).

Selznick arrived in the United States in 1888 and became a naturalized citizen on September 29, 1894. He settled in Pittsburgh and built up a successful jewelry retail business. In 1896, he married Florence "Flossie" Sachs. They had three sons: Howard Selznick (1897–1980), who suffered some undiagnosed mental disability; Myron Selznick (1898–1944), who worked as a producer and studio executive before establishing a talent agency; and David O. Selznick (1902–1965), a Hollywood filmmaker who produced Gone with the Wind (1939). A daughter, Ruth, was born in 1904 but died before the age of one.

Retaining his jewelry stores in the Pittsburgh area, Selznick moved his family to Brooklyn in 1903. He opened a large jewelry store, the Knickerbocker, at Sixth Avenue and 23rd Street in Manhattan, but by 1907 he had left the business. The family surname changed from Seleznick to Selznick sometime in 1908 or 1909. During this period, the family resided at 530 44th Street, a 1908 limestone/brownstone-clad Renaissance Revival row house in Brooklyn's Sunset Park district. In the year 1910 or 1911, the family moved to Manhattan, where Selznick worked as a patent promoter and sold electrical supplies.

Through an old acquaintance from Pittsburgh, Selznick became involved with the Universal Film Manufacturing Company in 1913 but was soon dismissed by Carl Laemmle. In February 1914, he and Chicago mail-order magnate Arthur Spiegel organized the World Film Corporation, a distributor of independently produced films located in Fort Lee, New Jersey, with general offices in New York City. Company directors included Jules Brulatour, Briton N. Busch (secretary and treasurer), Van Horn Ely (president), Lee Shubert, and Selznick (vice president and general manager). Film historian David Thomson describes World Film as "a loose gathering of companies and interests engaged in producing films, with a nationwide system of exchanges and theaters where they could be shown". Within a year the company showed a profit of $329,000 — more than $7.7 million today.

Selznick had been dabbling in theatrical production, and his company put popular plays on film. World Films releases in 1915 included Old Dutch featuring Lew Fields, The Boss starring Alice Brady and Holbrook Blinn, Trilby starring Wilton Lackaye and Clara Kimball Young, and Wildfire starring Lillian Russell and Lionel Barrymore.

Selznick's company soon merged with the Peerless Pictures Studios and the Shubert Brothers' Shubert Pictures Co., and became very successful, in 1915 hiring Sidney Olcott away from Kalem Studios plus the French director Maurice Tourneur away from the American arm of the giant, Pathé. By 1916, personality conflicts with his partners saw him ousted from the firm by the board of directors.

Selznick took with him World Film Corporation's biggest star, Clara Kimball Young, and became president and general manager of the newly formed Clara Kimball Young Film Corporation. Selznick and Young began a much-publicized affair, which resulted in her husband James Young divorcing her.

He then launched the film career of Nazimova with her first film War Brides, which was a success.

Selznick's business practices such as special preview functions, putting his name up in lights, signing stars for big salaries, upset others in the industry and Adolph Zukor purportedly offered him a salary of $5,000 a week for life to go to China and stay there. He later invented an advance deposit system whereby his productions were financed by selling the rights to exhibitors.

Although he had annoyed other film industry people, he had a friendship with Marcus Loew who helped him with loans. Following Norma Talmadge's marriage to Joseph Schenck, the booking manager for the Loew circuit, Talmadge signed for Selznick and the first film of hers he distributed, Panthea, set her on the road to becoming a star. Talmadge's sister Constance also signed for Selznick.

In 1917, Zukor acquired a 50% interest in Selznick's Select Pictures; however, this led to Selznick's name no longer appearing in lights or on the screen. Constance Talmadge then asked for his name to be removed from her pictures.

Following this, Selznick's son Myron signed Olive Thomas in December 1918, and put the Selznick name up in lights again. Selznick then bought out Zukor to take control of Select Pictures again.

Selznick continued in film on the East Coast until 1920 when he moved to Hollywood, where he teamed up with Zukor and Jesse L. Lasky. However, within a few years his company, Lewis J. Selznick Productions, Inc., began to lose stars; Selznick experienced severe financial difficulties, and went bankrupt in 1925. He re-entered the industry the following year, and managed Associated Exhibitors before retiring from the film business.

Selznick died at his home in Los Angeles on January 25, 1933, from a heart attack, with his wife and sons at his bedside. He is interred at Forest Lawn Memorial Cemetery in Glendale, California.

== Legacy ==
For his contribution to the motion picture industry, Lewis J. Selznick was inducted into the Hollywood Walk of Fame on February 8, 1960. His star is located at 6412 Hollywood Blvd.

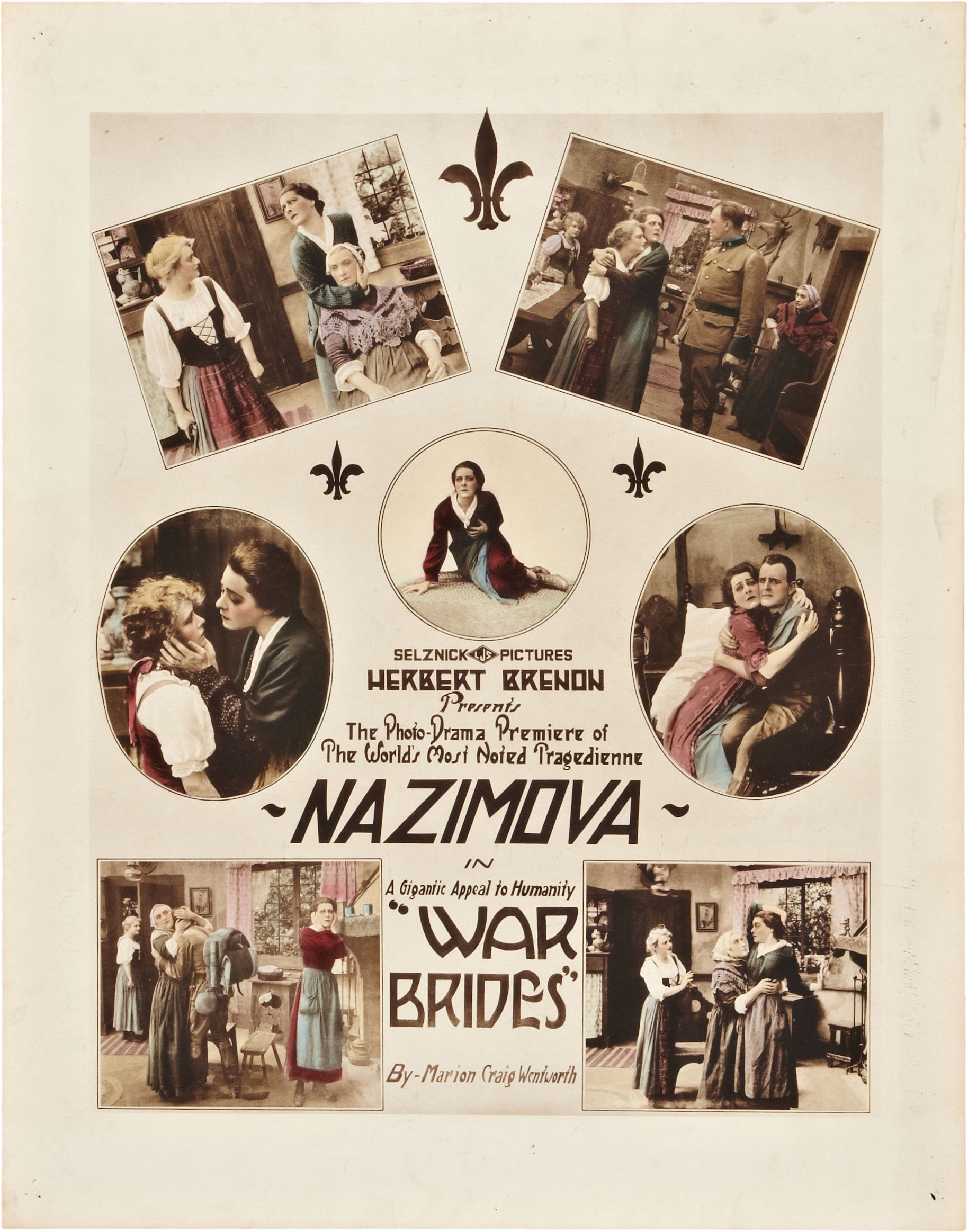
Poster for War Brides (1916)

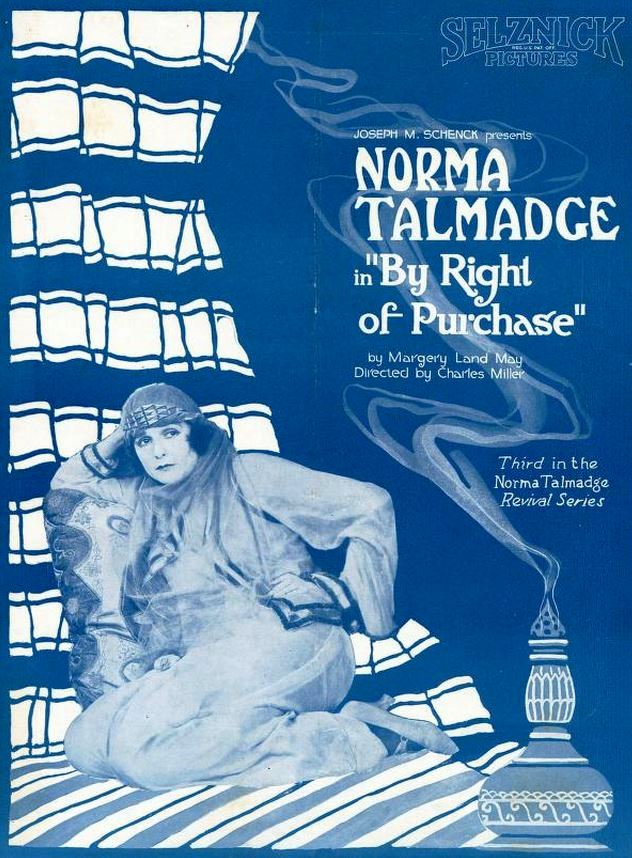
Advertisement for By Right of Purchase (1918)

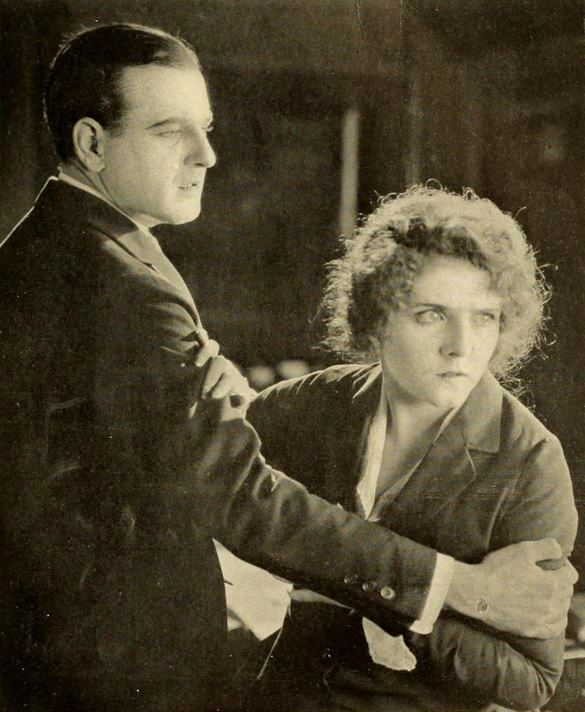
Robert Ellis and Olive Thomas in The Spite Bride (1919)

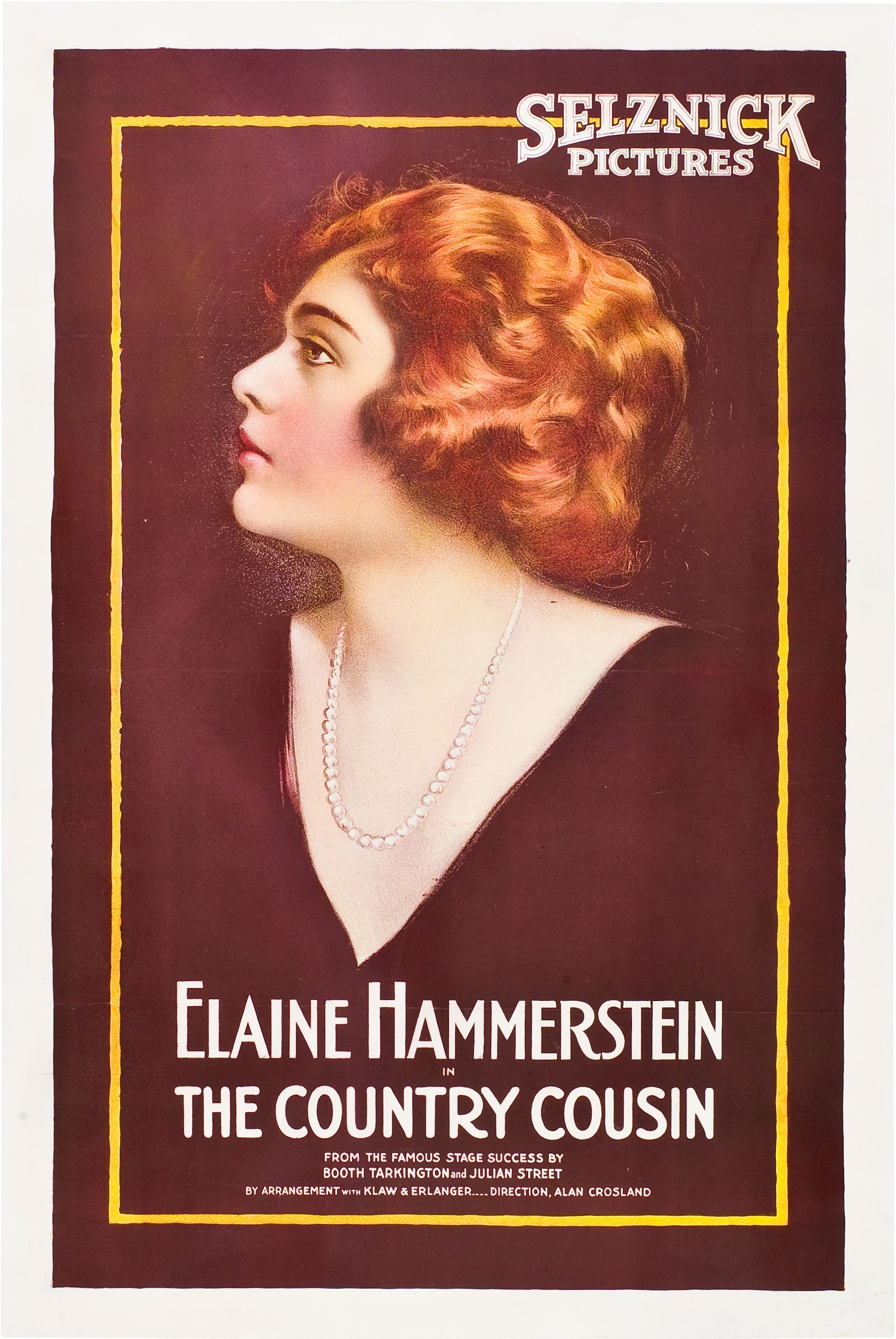
Poster for The Country Cousin (1919)

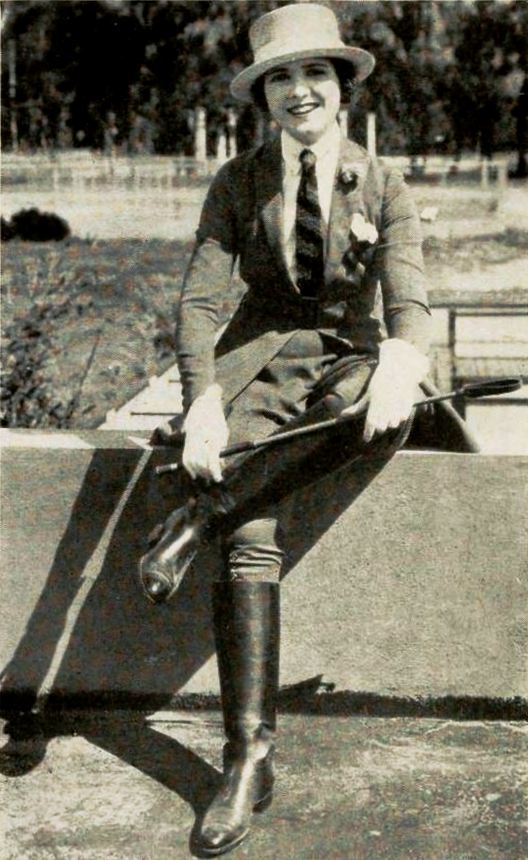
Olive Thomas in Upstairs and Down (1919)

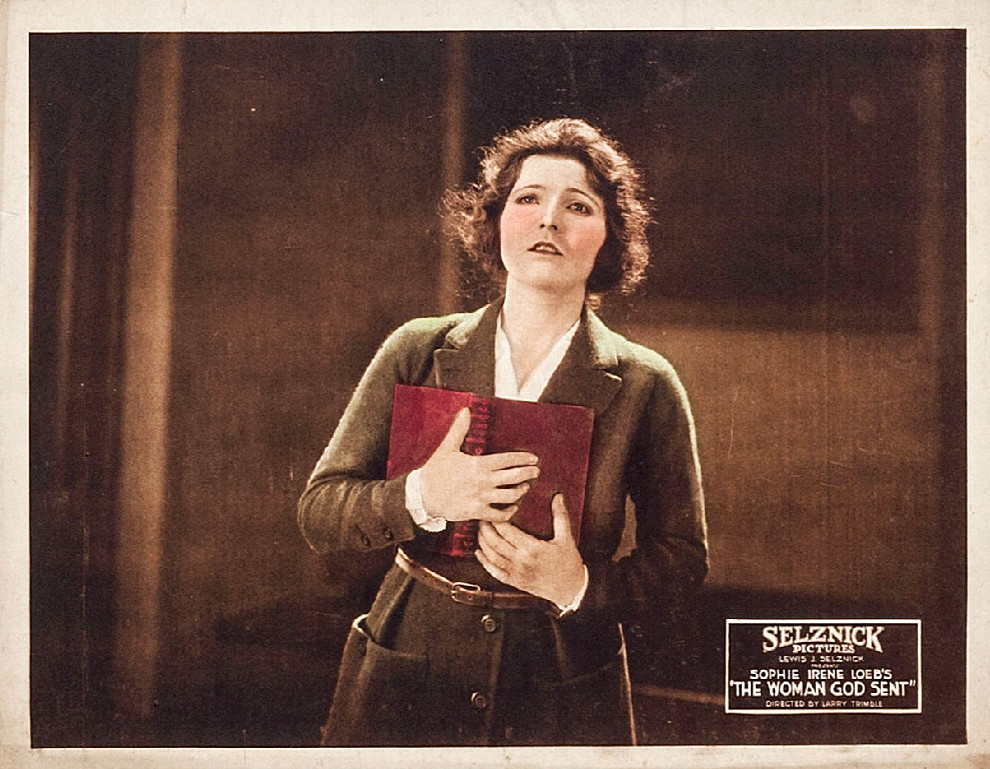
Lobby card for The Woman God Sent (1920)

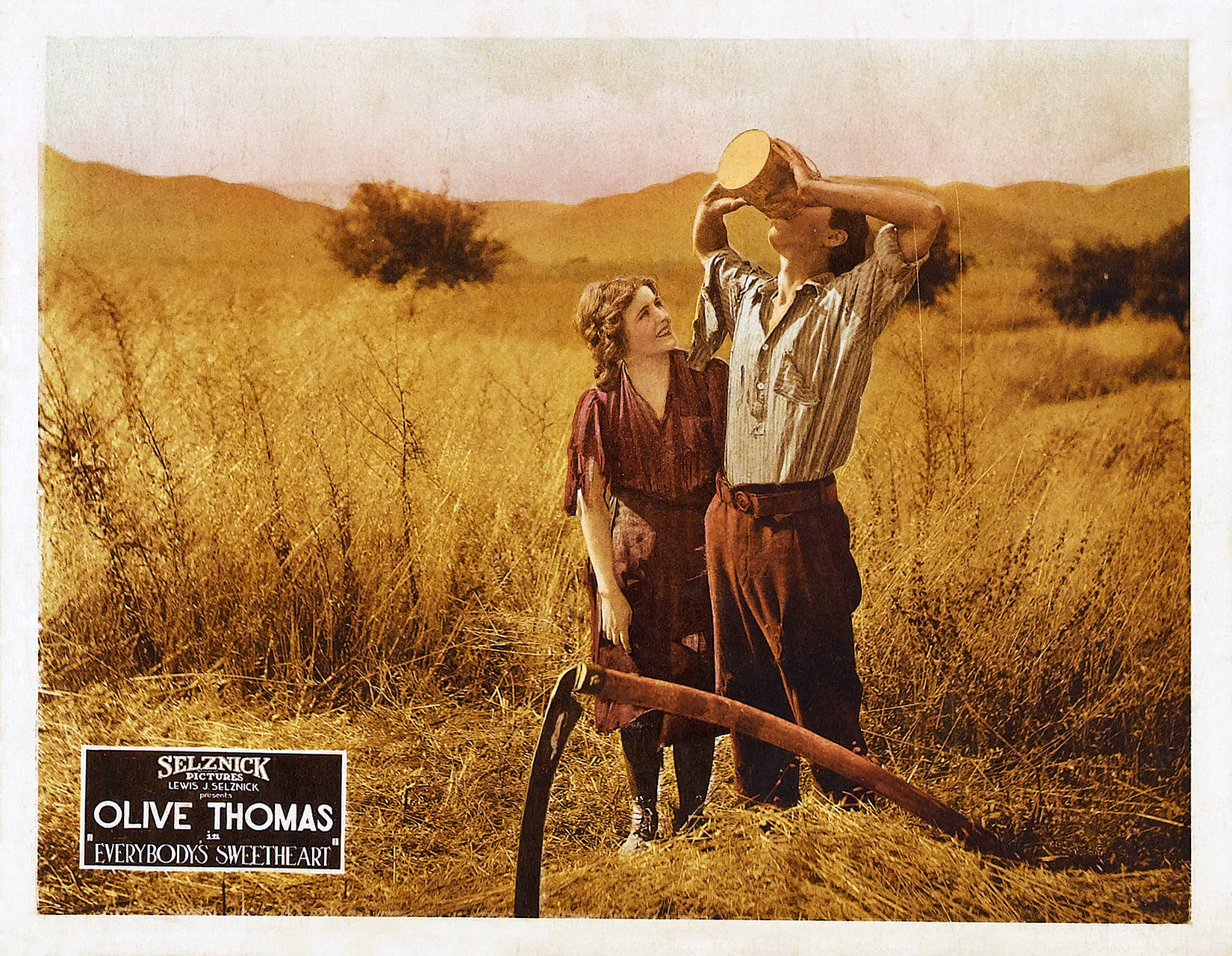
Lobby card for Everybody's Sweetheart (1920)

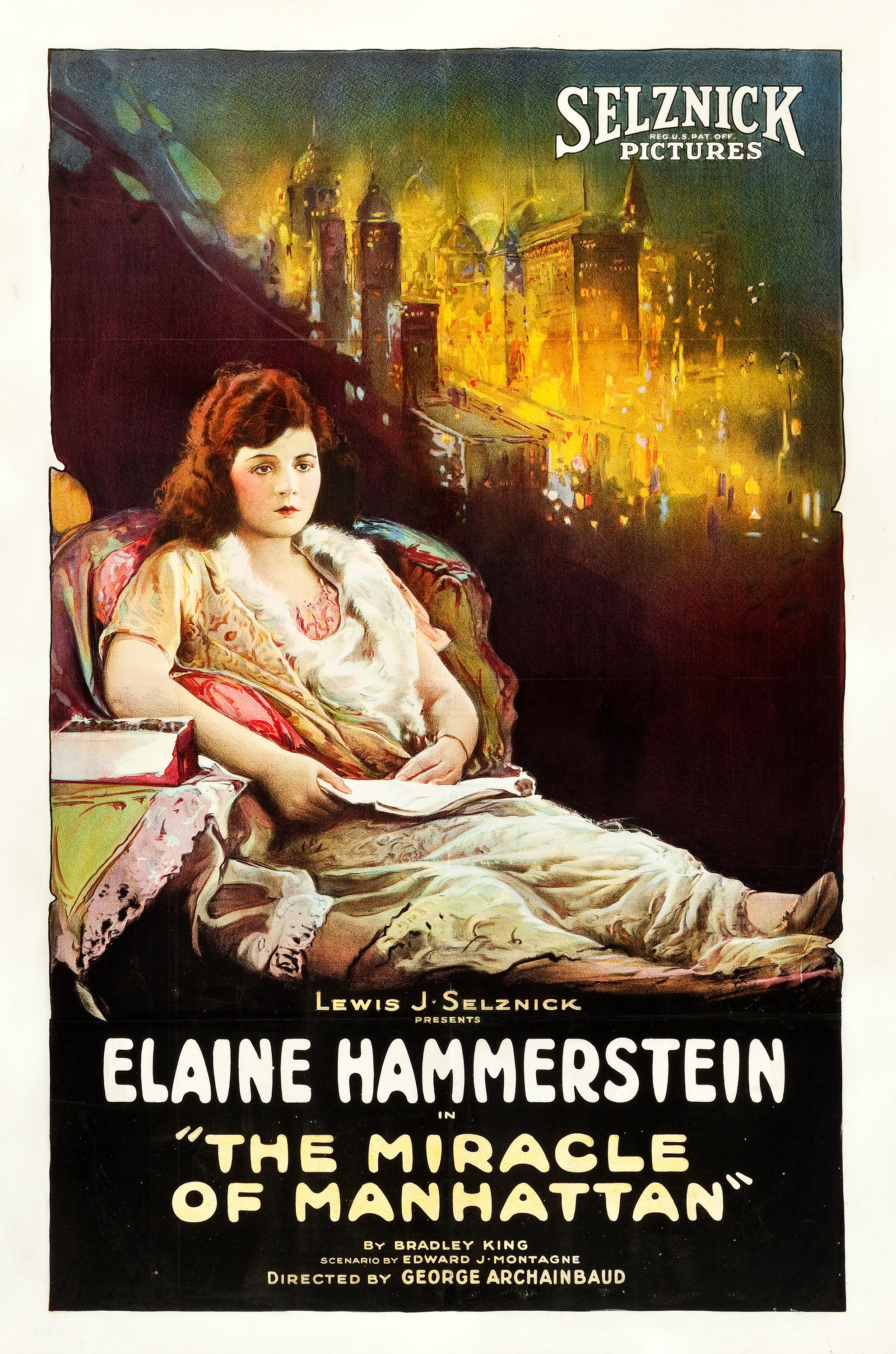
Poster for The Miracle of Manhattan (1921)

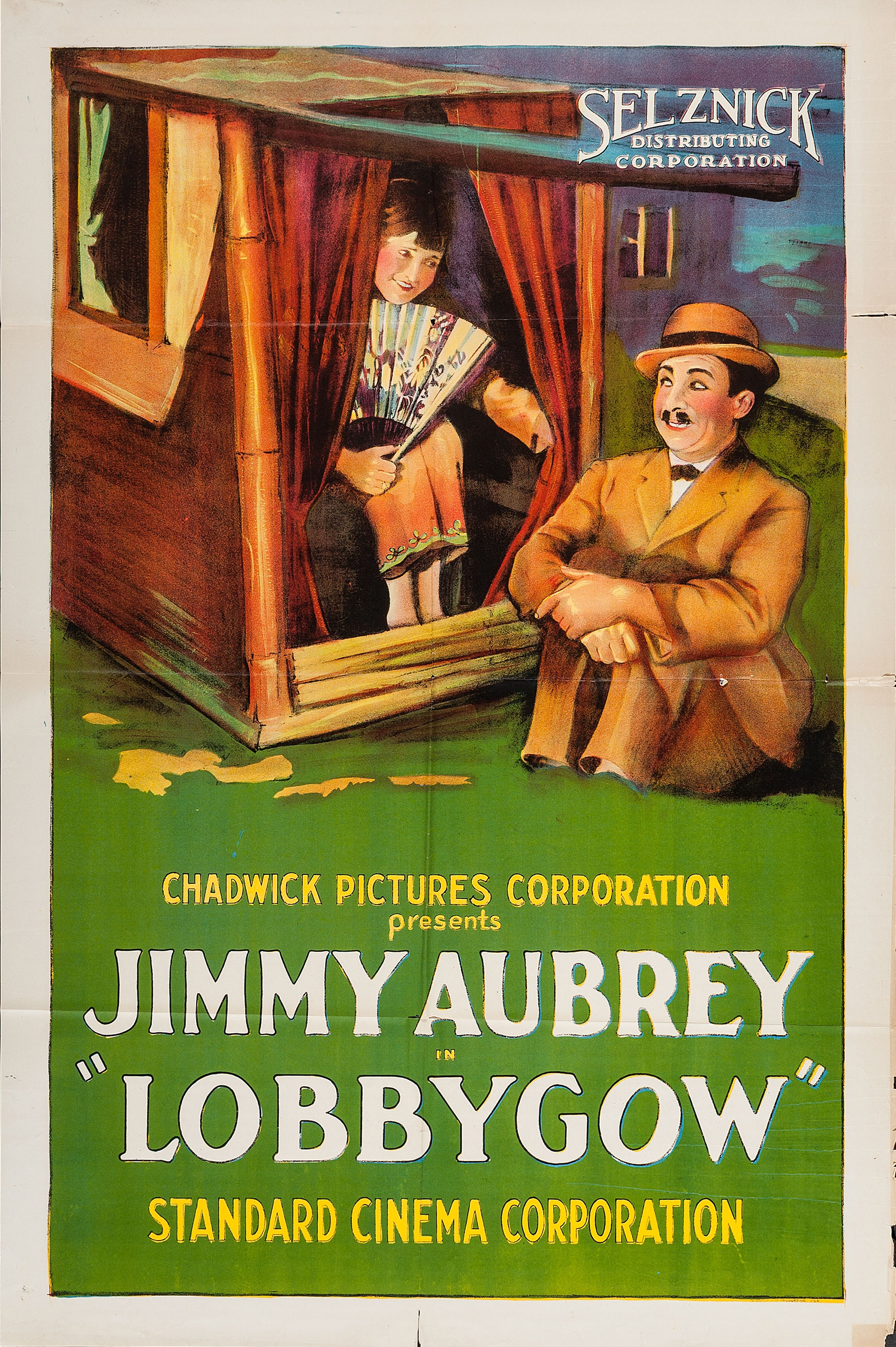
Poster for Lobbygow (1923)

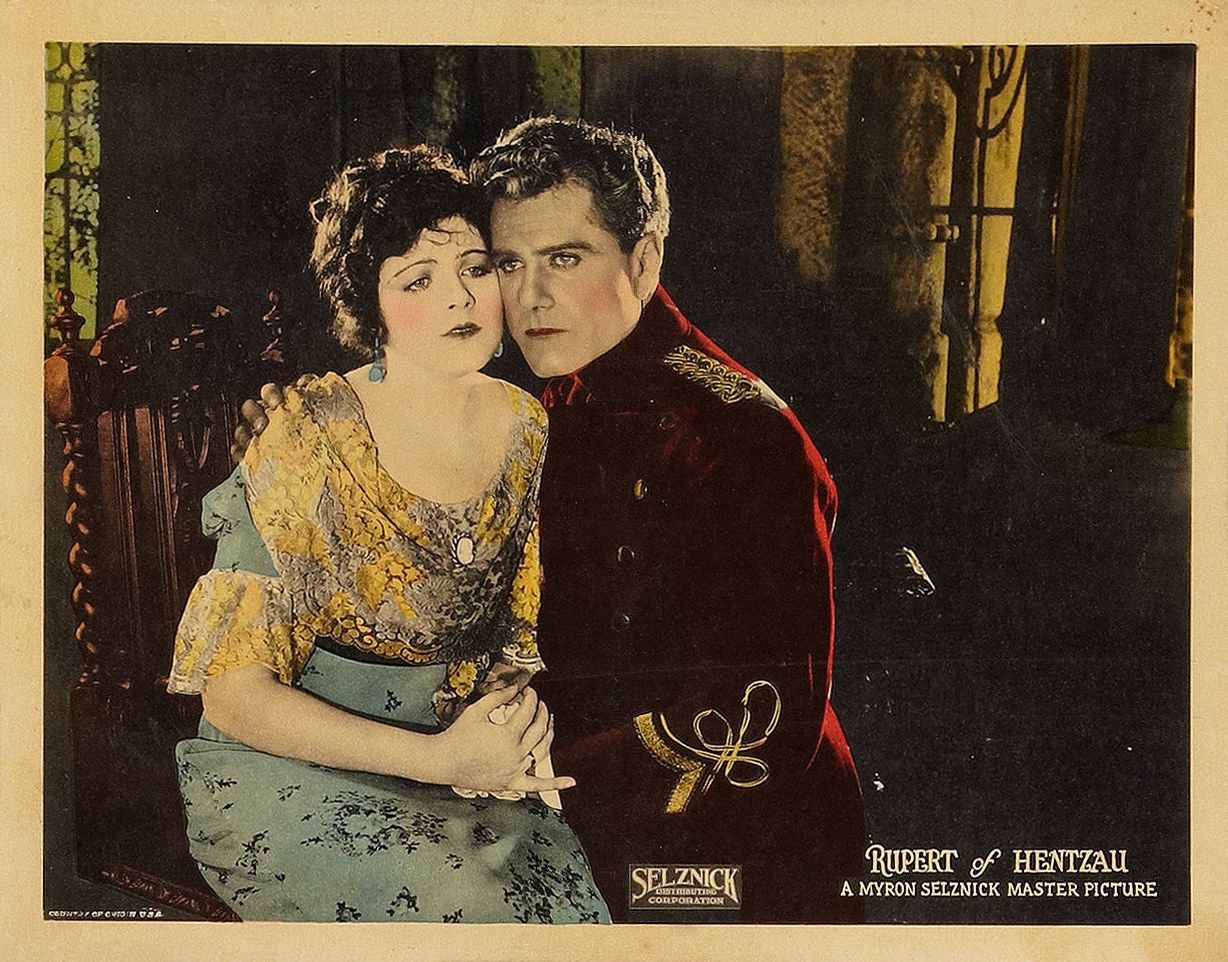
Lobby card for Rupert of Hentzau (1923)

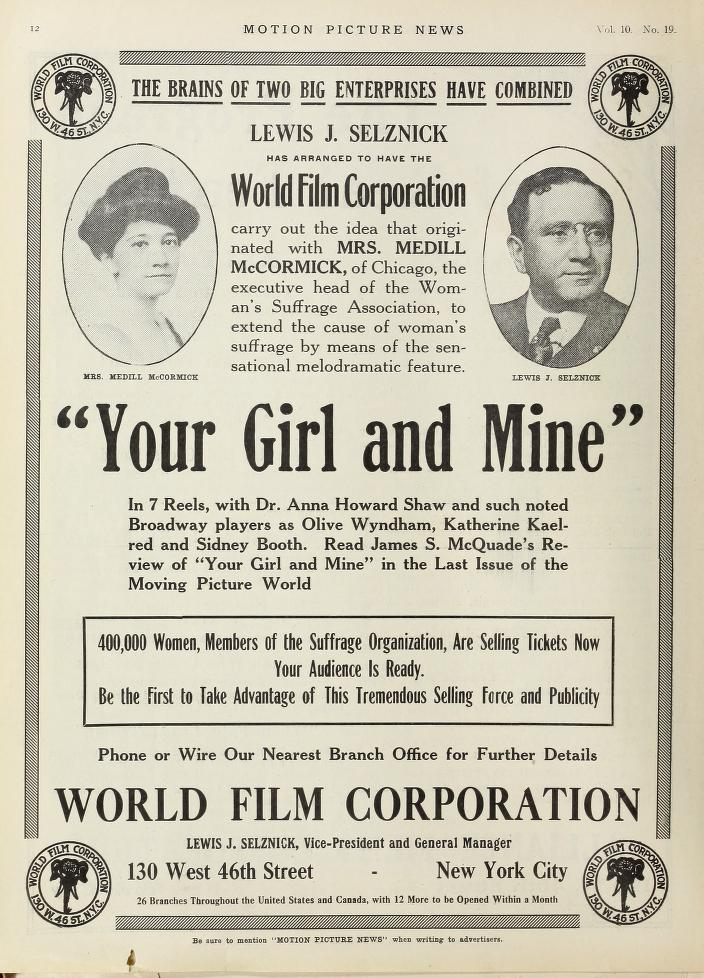
Your Girl and Mine advertisement in 1914
