= Everybody's Sweetheart (1920 film) =

1920 film by Alan Crosland, Laurence Trimble

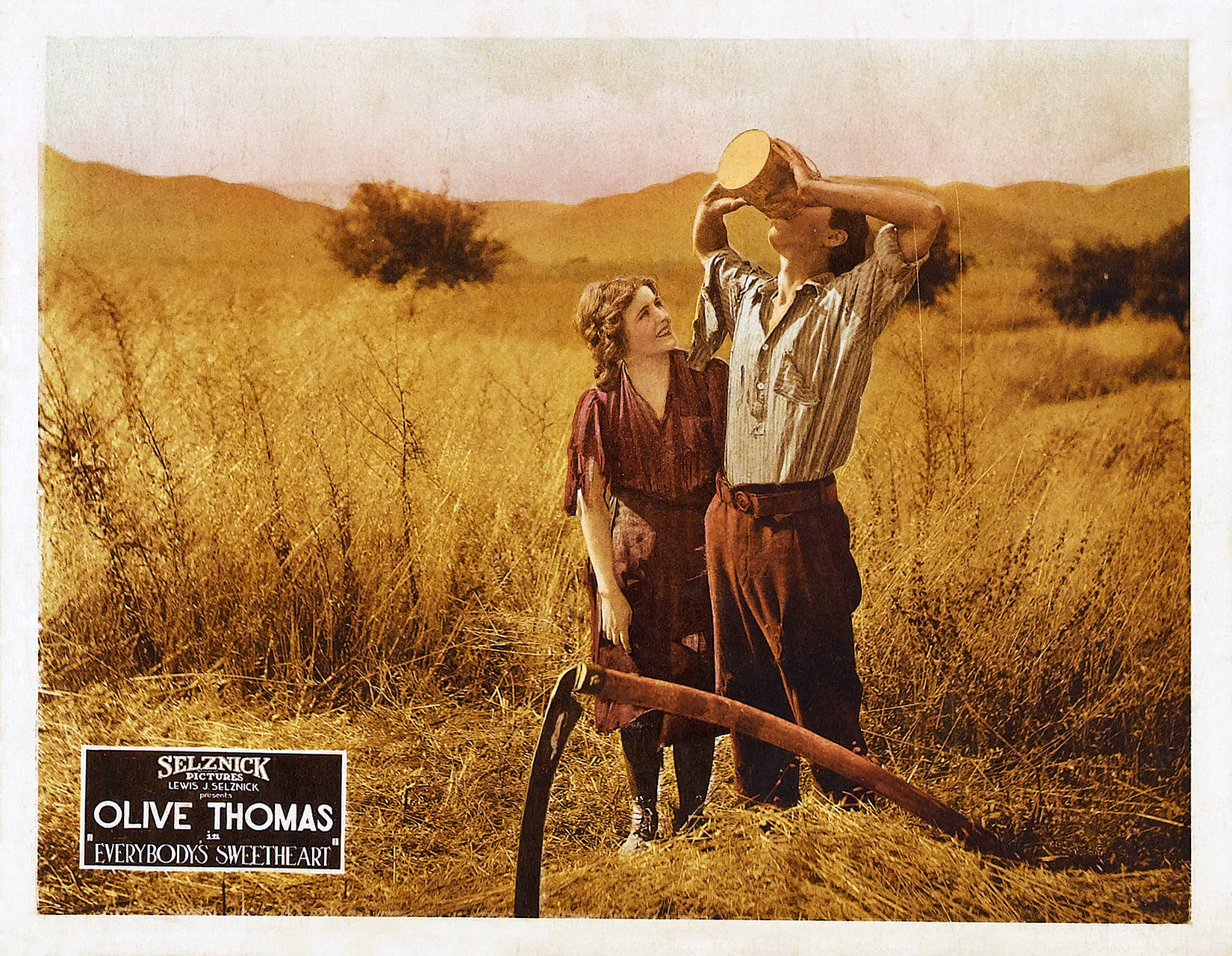
- Lobby card
- Directed by: Laurence Trimble; Alan Crosland
- Screenplay by: John Lynch
- Story by: John Lynch
- Starring: Olive Thomas; William Collier Jr.
- Cinematography: Robert Newhard
- Edited by: Duncan Mansfield
- Production company: Selznick Pictures Corporation
- Distributed by: Select Pictures Corporation
- Release date: October 4, 1920
- Running time: 5 reels
- Country: United States
- Language: Silent (English intertitles)

Everybody's Sweetheart is a 1920 American silent comedy-drama film directed by Laurence Trimble and Alan Crosland and written by John Lynch. The film stars Olive Thomas and William Collier Jr. Everybody's Sweetheart was Thomas' final film role and was released nearly a month after her death from acute nephritis (due to accidental ingestion of mercury bichloride) in Paris on September 10, 1920.

A copy of Everybody's Sweetheart is preserved in the George Eastman Museum Motion Picture Collection.

== Plot ==
As described in a film magazine, Mary and John, residents of the county poor farm, have had their lots cast there by a train wreck from which they were taken as babies and the identity of their parents lost. The two are the closest of friends and Mary is everybody's sweetheart about the place. She concentrates her gospel of cheer and kindness of heart, however, on John and old Corporal Joe, a Civil War veteran, mothering the two most solicitously. When John is placed out to work on a neighboring farm and there is a change in matrons that makes life at the county farm house unbearable, the Corporal and Mary, the latter in clothes taken from a scarecrow, leave with John accompanying them. Illness of the Corporal forces them to take refuge in the home of the wealthy General Phillip Bingham, who proves to be the Corporal's old chief from the war. The General promises the dying veteran that he will take care of Mary. John is engaged to assist the gardener. One day, wearing the uniform of a West Point cadet that he donned while rummaging in the attic, John assumes such a likeness to the General's dear and disowned son that he is proved to be a son of the latter. Both John and Mary are offered the shelter of the General's home with the expectation that they will marry when they come of age.

== Cast ==
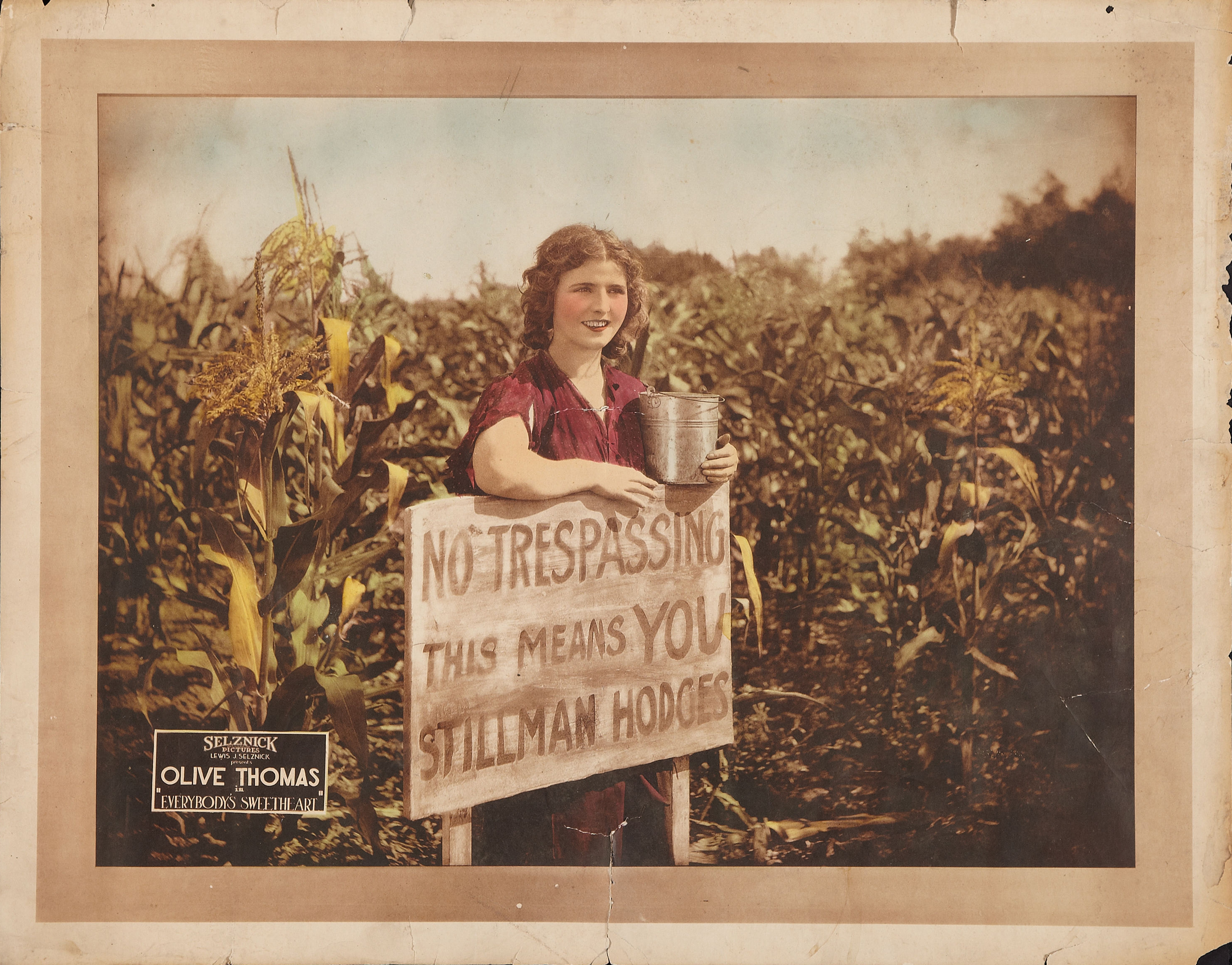
Theatrical release poster

- Olive Thomas as Mary
- William Collier Jr. as John
- Joseph Dowling as General Phillip Bingham
- Walt Whitman as The Corporal
- Aileen Manning as Sophia Treadwell
- Martha Mattox as Mrs. Reese
- Hal Wilson as Alabama Joe
- Bob Hick as Mr. Reese
- Philip Sleeman (Minor Role) (uncredited)
