= Olive Thomas =

American actress and model (1894–1920)

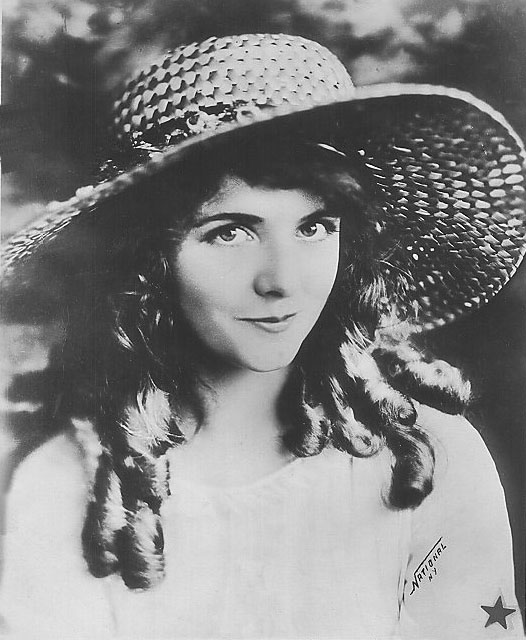
- Thomas in 1919
- Born: Olive R. Duffy; October 20, 1894; Charleroi, Pennsylvania, U.S.
- Died: September 10, 1920 (aged 25); Neuilly-sur-Seine, Paris, France
- Cause of death: Acute nephritis caused by accidental poisoning
- Resting place: Woodlawn Cemetery
- Other names: Oliva R. Duffy; Oliveretta Elaine Duffy; Olive Elaine Duffy; Ollie
- Occupations: Actress; art model; photo model
- Years active: 1914–1920
- Spouses: Bernard Krug Thomas (m. 1911; div. 1913) Jack Pickford (m. 1916)

Olive Thomas (born Olive R. Duffy; October 20, 1894 – September 10, 1920) was an American silent-film actress, art model, and photo model. Her birth certificate appears to list her name as Oliva, but this is widely thought to be an error. In the 1900 census, she is listed as Olive R. Duffy.

Thomas began her career as an illustrator's model in 1914, and moved on to the Ziegfeld Follies the following year. During her time as a Ziegfeld girl, she also appeared in the more risqué show The Midnight Frolic. In 1916, she began a successful career in silent films and would appear in more than 20 features over the course of her four-year film career. That year, she married actor Jack Pickford, the younger brother of fellow silent-film star Mary Pickford.

On September 10, 1920 at 11:00 AM, Thomas died in Paris five days after ingesting mercury bichloride, which brought on acute nephritis. Although her death was ruled accidental, news of her hospitalization and subsequent death were the subject of speculation in the press. Thomas's death is considered one of the first major Hollywood scandals.

== Early life ==
Olive Duffy was born in Charleroi, Pennsylvania. She was the middle child of three born to Lourena ("Rena") and Michael Duffy, both of whom were of Irish descent. She had two brothers, James (born 1898) and Michael (born 1893).

While most sources claim her father's name was James Duffy, that he was a steelworker, and that he died in a work-related accident, Olive's birth certificate (as presented in the documentary Everybody's Sweetheart) states that his name was Michael. The record of his death in the City of Allegheny, Pennsylvania, also shows his name as Michael, indicates that his occupation was "bricklayer," and states that his cause of death was pneumonia.

After her father's death, the family moved to McKees Rocks, Pennsylvania, a small mill town. Olive and her brothers often stayed with their grandparents while their mother Rena worked in a local factory. Rena Duffy later married Harry M. Van Kirk, a worker on the Pittsburgh and Lake Erie Railroad. Their only child together, daughter Harriet, was born in 1914 and died in a car crash in 1931.

Olive left school at 15 to help support her siblings. She got a job selling gingham at Joseph Horne's department store for $2.75 per week (equivalent to $95.02 in 2025). At 16 in April 1911, she married Bernard Krug Thomas in McKees Rocks. During the two-year marriage, she reportedly worked as a clerk in Kaufmann's, a major department store in Pittsburgh. After their separation in 1913, Olive moved to New York City and lived with a family member. She later found work in a Harlem department store.

== Career ==
=== Modeling ===
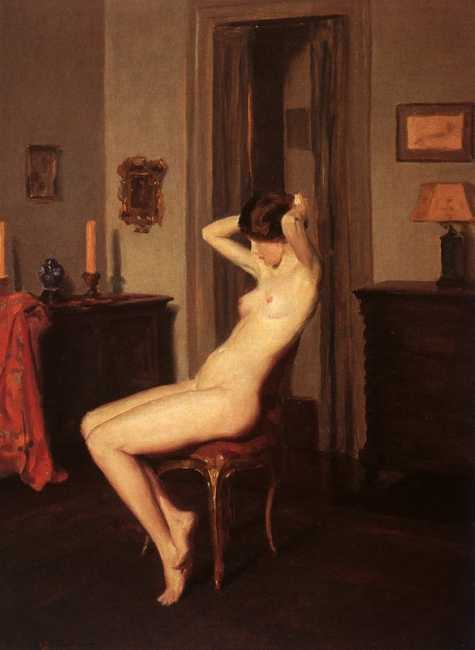
Between Poses by Penrhyn Stanlaws, 1915

In 1914, Thomas entered and subsequently won the "Most Beautiful Girl in New York City" contest held by Howard Chandler Christy, a commercial artist. Winning the contest helped establish her career as an artists' model, and she would later pose for Harrison Fisher, Raphael Kirchner, Penrhyn Stanlaws, and Haskell Coffin. Thomas was featured on many magazine covers, including that of the Saturday Evening Post.

=== Stage ===
Fisher wrote a letter of recommendation to Florenz Ziegfeld, Jr., resulting in Thomas' being hired for the Ziegfeld Follies. However, Thomas later disputed this, claiming she "walked right up and asked for the job". She made her stage debut in the Ziegfeld Follies of 1915 on June 21, 1915. Thomas' popularity in the Follies led to her being cast in Ziegfeld's more risqué Midnight Frolic show. The Frolic was staged after hours in the roof garden of the New Amsterdam Theatre. It was primarily a show for famous male patrons who had plenty of money to bestow on the beautiful young female performers. Thomas received expensive gifts from her admirers; it was rumored that German Ambassador Albrecht von Bernstorff had given her a $10,000 string of pearls.

During her time in The Follies, Thomas began an affair with Florenz Ziegfeld. Ziegfeld, who was married to actress Billie Burke, had affairs with other Ziegfeld girls, including Lillian Lorraine and Marilyn Miller (who later married Thomas' widower Jack Pickford). Thomas ended the affair with Ziegfeld after he refused to leave Burke to marry her.

Thomas continued modeling while appearing in the Follies. Alberto Vargas, Florenz Ziegfeld’s artist-in-residence who painted many stars of the Ziegfeld stage, immortalized Thomas in the portrait he painted of her from memory after her death and titled it Memory of Olive Thomas or The Lotus Eater (as noted on the label he placed on the back of the completed work). "Lotus Eater" was a reference to Lotus-eaters of Greek mythology. The portrait depicts Thomas nude from the waist up, covering her left breast with her left hand while holding a rose with her right above her upraised face. The painting remained in his personal collection until his death in 1982 and was sold by his estate to a private collector in 1986. Vargas called Thomas "one of the most beautiful brunettes that Ziegfeld ever glorified."

=== Silent films ===
In July 1916, Thomas signed with the International Film Company. She made her on-screen debut in Episode 10 of Beatrice Fairfax, a film serial, which was shot in Ithaca, New York. In 1917, she made her full-length feature debut in A Girl Like That for Paramount Pictures.

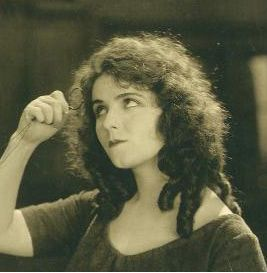
Thomas in Out Yonder, 1919

That same year, she signed with Triangle Pictures. Shortly after, news broke of her engagement to actor Jack Pickford, whom she had married a year prior. Thomas and Pickford, who was the younger brother of Mary Pickford, kept the marriage secret because Thomas did not want people to think her success in film was due to her association with the Pickfords. Her first film for Triangle, Madcap Madge, was released in June 1917. Thomas's popularity at Triangle grew with performances in Indiscreet Corrine (1917) and Limousine Life (1918). In 1919, she portrayed a French girl who poses as a boy in Toton the Apache. Thomas later said that she felt her work in Toton was "the first real thing I've ever done." She made her final film for Triangle, The Follies Girl, that same year.

After leaving Triangle, Thomas signed with Myron Selznick's Selznick Pictures Company in December 1918 for a salary of $2,500 a week. She hoped for more serious roles, believing that with her husband signed to the same company, she would have more influence. Her first film for Selznick, Upstairs and Down (1919), proved successful and established her image as a "baby vamp". She followed with roles in Love's Prisoner and Out Yonder, both in 1919. In 1920's The Flapper, Thomas played a teenage schoolgirl who yearns for excitement beyond her small Florida town. Thomas was the first actress to portray a lead character who was a flapper, and the film was the first of its kind to portray the flapper lifestyle. Frances Marion, who wrote the scenario, was responsible for bringing the term into the American vernacular. The Flapper proved to be popular and became one of Thomas's most successful films. On October 4, 1920, Thomas's final film, Everybody's Sweetheart, was released.

== Personal life ==
Thomas's first marriage was to Bernard Krug Thomas, a man she met at age 15 while living in McKees Rocks, Pennsylvania. They married on April 1, 1911, and lived with his parents in McKees Rocks for the first six months of their marriage, then moved into their own apartment. Krug Thomas worked as a clerk at the Pressed Steel Car Company while Olive took care of the home. In 1913, the couple separated and Olive moved to New York City to pursue a career as a model. She was granted a divorce on September 25, 1915, on the grounds of desertion and cruelty. In 1931, Bernard Krug Thomas gave an interview to The Pittsburg Press, detailing his marriage to Olive, implying that a cause of the demise of their marriage was her ambition and a desire to both obtain a life of "luxury" and "improve her station".

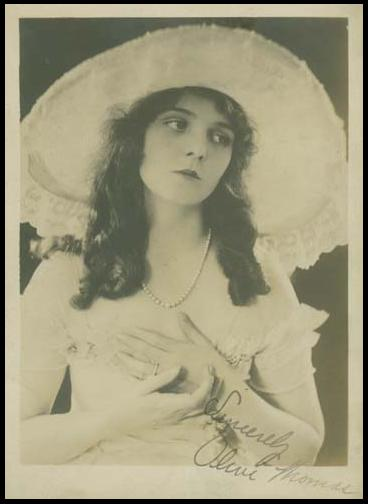
Autographed photo of Thomas, c. 1916

In late 1916, Thomas met actor Jack Pickford, brother of one of the most successful silent stars, Mary Pickford, at Cafe Nat Goodwin on the Santa Monica Pier. Both Thomas and Pickford were known for their partying. Screenwriter Frances Marion remarked, "I had seen her often at the Pickford home, for she was engaged to Mary's brother, Jack. Two innocent-looking children, they were the gayest, wildest brats who ever stirred the stardust on Broadway. Both were talented, but they were much more interested in playing the roulette of life than in concentrating on their careers." Thomas eloped with Pickford on October 25, 1916, in New Jersey. None of their family was present, with actor Thomas Meighan as their only witness. Although the couple never had their own children, in 1920 they adopted Thomas's six-year-old nephew, the son of one of her brothers, after his mother died.

By most accounts, Thomas was the love of Pickford's life. However, the marriage was tumultuous and filled with highly-charged conflict, followed by lavish making up through the exchange of expensive gifts. Pickford's family did not always approve of Thomas, but most of the family did attend her funeral. In Mary Pickford's 1955 autobiography Sunshine and Shadow, she wrote:

I regret to say that none of us approved of the marriage at that time. Mother thought Jack was too young, and Lottie and I felt that Olive, being in musical comedy, belonged to an alien world. Ollie had all the rich, eligible men of the social world at her feet. She had been deluged with proposals from her own world of the theater as well. Which was not at all surprising. The beauty of Olive Thomas is legendary. The girl had the loveliest violet-blue eyes I have ever seen. They were fringed with long dark lashes that seemed darker because of the delicate translucent pallor of her skin. I could understand why Florenz Ziegfeld never forgave Jack for taking her away from the Follies. She and Jack were madly in love with one another, but I always thought of them as a couple of children playing together.

== Death ==
For several years, Thomas and Pickford had intended to vacation together. Both were constantly traveling and had little time to spend together. With their marriage on the rocks, the couple decided to take a second honeymoon. In August 1920, the pair headed for Paris, hoping to combine a vacation with some film preparations.

On the night of September 5, 1920, they went out for a night of entertainment and partying at the famous bistros in the Montparnasse Quarter of Paris. Returning to their suite in the Hotel Ritz around 3 a.m., Pickford either fell asleep or was outside the bedroom. An intoxicated and tired Thomas ingested a mercury bichloride solution, which may have been prescribed to Pickford as a topical medication to treat sores caused by syphilis. While accounts vary, authorities speculated that Thomas thought the flask contained either drinking water or a sleeping tonic. The medication's label was in French, which may have added to her confusion. After drinking the liquid she screamed, "Oh, my God!" and Pickford rushed to assist her. She was taken to the American Hospital in the Paris suburb of Neuilly-sur-Seine, where Pickford and his former brother-in-law Owen Moore remained at her side until she died five days later at 11:00 AM.

=== Controversy and death ruling ===
While Thomas lay in the American Hospital dying, the press began reporting on the various rumors that began to arise about the circumstances of the incident. Some papers reported that Thomas had attempted suicide after having a fight with Pickford over his alleged infidelities, while others said she attempted suicide after discovering Pickford had given her syphilis. There were rumors that Thomas was plagued by a drug addiction, that she and Pickford had been involved in "champagne and cocaine orgies," or that Pickford tricked her into drinking poison in an attempt to murder her to collect her insurance money. Owen Moore, who accompanied Pickford and Thomas in Paris, denied the rumors, saying that Thomas was not suicidal and that she and Pickford had not fought that evening. Jack Pickford also denied the rumors, stating, "Olive and I were the greatest pals on Earth. Her death is a ghastly mistake."

On September 13, 1920, Pickford gave his account of that night to the Los Angeles Herald-Examiner:

We arrived back at the Ritz hotel at about 3 o'clock in the morning. I had already booked airplane seats for London. We were going Sunday morning. Both of us were tired out. We both had been drinking a little. I insisted that we had better not pack then, but rather get up early before our trip and do it then. I went to bed immediately. She fussed around and wrote a note to her mother. ... She was in the bathroom.
Suddenly she shrieked: 'My God.' I jumped out of bed, rushed toward her and caught her in my arms. She cried to me to find out what was in the bottle. I picked it up and read: 'Poison.' It was a toilet solution and the label was in French. I realized what she had done and sent for the doctor. Meanwhile, I forced her to drink water in order to make her vomit. She screamed, 'O, my God, I'm poisoned.' I forced the whites of eggs down her throat, hoping to offset the poison. The doctor came. He pumped her stomach three times while I held Olive.
Nine o'clock in the morning I got her to the Neuilly Hospital, where Doctors Choate and Wharton took charge of her. They told me she had swallowed bichloride of mercury in an alcoholic solution, which is ten times worse than tablets. She didn't want to die. She took the poison by mistake. We both loved each other since the day we married. The fact that we were separated months at a time made no difference in our affection for each other. She even was conscious enough the day before she died to ask the nurse to come to America with her until she had fully recovered, having no thought she would die.
She kept continually calling for me. I was beside her day and night until her death. The physicians held out hope for her until the last moment, until they found her kidneys paralyzed. Then they lost hope. But the doctors told me she had fought harder than any patient they ever had. She held onto her life as only one case in fifty. She seemed stronger the last two days. She was conscious, and said she would get better and go home to her mother. 'It's all a mistake, darling Jack,' she said. But I knew she was dying.
She was kept alive only by hypodermic injections during the last twelve hours. I was the last one she recognized. I watched her eyes glaze and realized she was dying. I asked her how she was feeling and she answered: 'Pretty weak, but I'll be all right in a little while, don't worry, darling.' Those were her last words. I held her in my arms and she died an hour later. Owen Moore was at her bedside. All stories and rumors of wild parties and cocaine and domestic fights since we left New York are untrue.

After Thomas's death, the police initiated an investigation, and an autopsy was performed, which attributed the death to acute nephritis caused by mercury bichloride absorption. On September 13, 1920, her death was ruled accidental by the Paris physician who conducted her autopsy.

=== Funeral ===
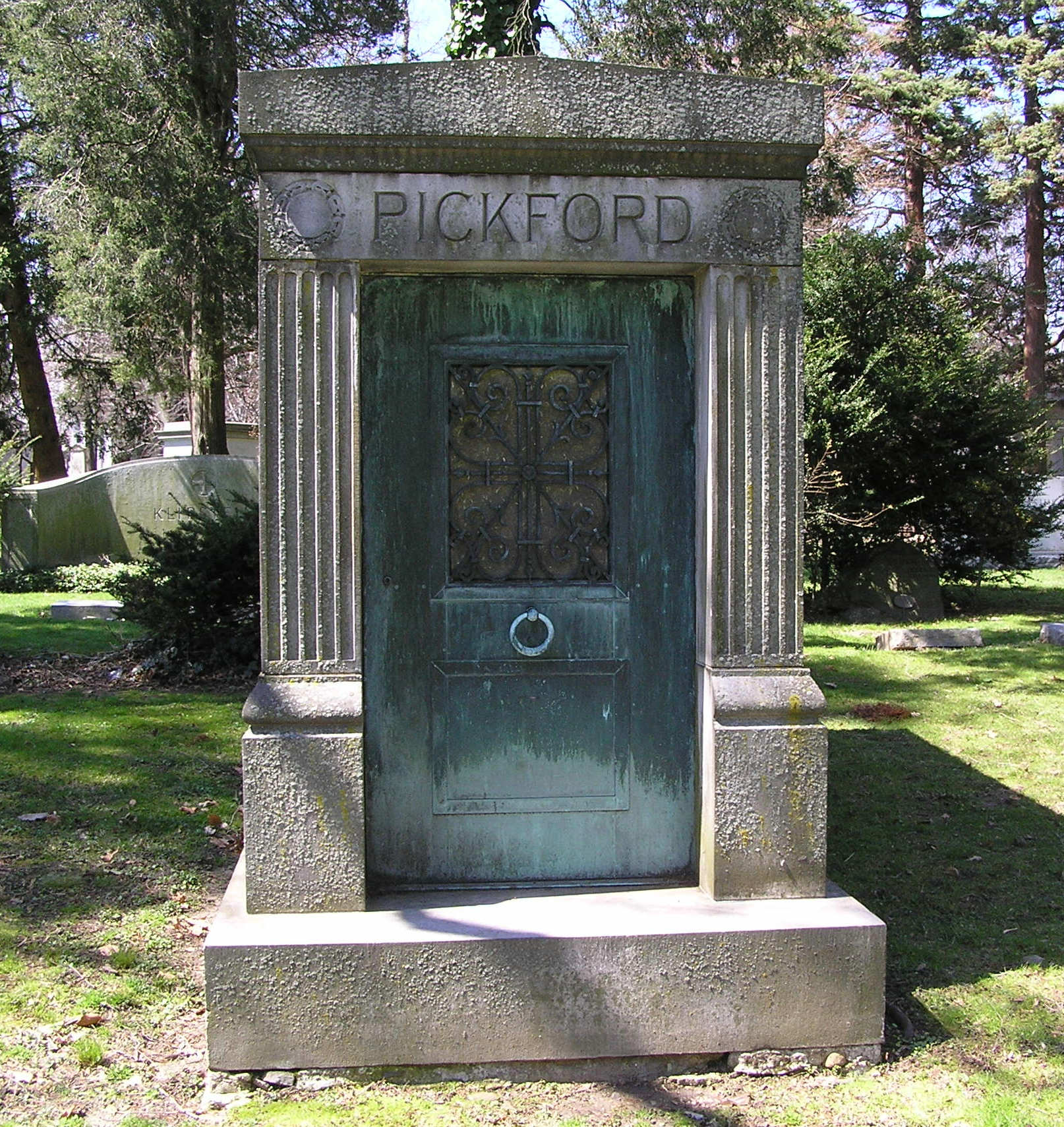
Olive Thomas Pickford's mausoleum in New York

Jack Pickford brought Thomas's body back to the United States. Several accounts state that Pickford tried to commit suicide en route but was talked out of it. In her autobiography, Mary Pickford recalls her brother's disclosure that he had made such an attempt during the return trip:

Jack crossed the ocean with Ollie's body. It wasn't until several years later that he confessed to Mother how one night during the voyage back he put on his trousers and jacket over his pajamas, went up on deck, and was climbing over the rail when something inside him said: "You can't do this to your mother and sisters. It would be a cowardly act. You must live and face the future."

On September 29, 1920, an Episcopal funeral service for Thomas was held at St. Thomas Episcopal Church in New York City. According to The New York Times, police escorts were needed at the event, as the church was crowded with "hundreds" of fellow actors and other invited attendees, as well as a horde of curious onlookers. Several women were reported to have fainted during the ceremony, and several men had their hats crushed in the rush to view the casket. Thomas is interred in a crypt at the Woodlawn Cemetery in The Bronx.

=== Estate ===
Thomas did not leave a will upon her death. Her estate, which was later valued at $27,644, (equivalent to $440,000 in 2025) was split between her mother, her two brothers, and husband Jack Pickford. Pickford later relinquished his right to a portion of the money, choosing instead to give his share to Thomas's mother.

On November 22, 1920, the bulk of Thomas's personal property was auctioned off in an estate sale, which netted approximately $30,000. Lewis Selznick bought Thomas's town car for an undisclosed sum. Mabel Normand bought a 20-piece toilet set, a 14-karat gold cigarette case, and three pieces of jewelry, including a sapphire pin.

== Aftermath ==
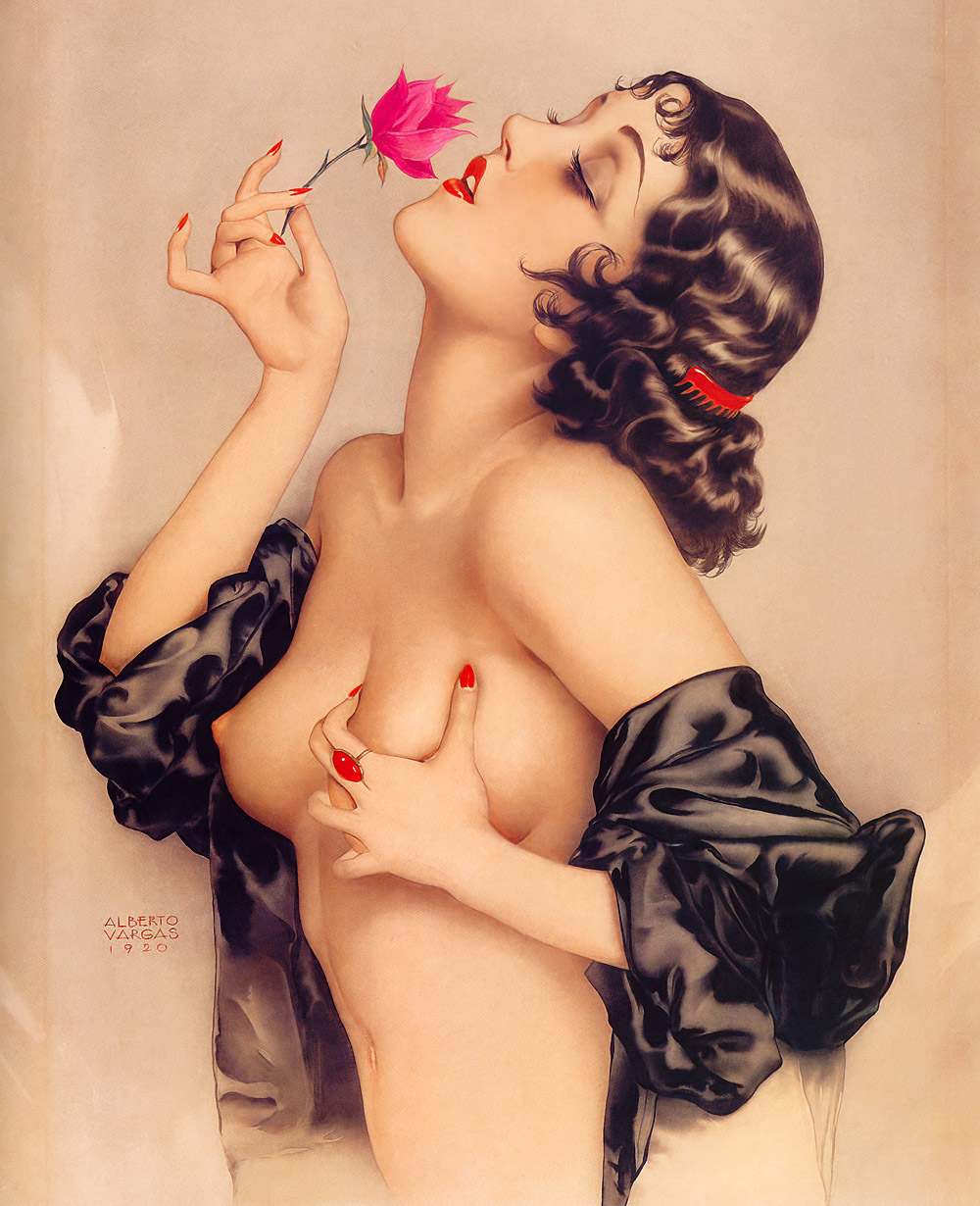
Memory of Olive Thomas or The Lotus Eater by Alberto Vargas, 1920

The press coverage of Olive Thomas's death was one of the first examples of the media sensationalism related to a major Hollywood star. Her death has been cited as one of the first major Hollywood scandals.

Other scandals around the time—including the Fatty Arbuckle trial in 1921, the murder of William Desmond Taylor in 1922, and the drug-related death of Wallace Reid in 1923—caused many religious and morality groups to label Hollywood as "immoral".

== In popular culture ==
- A legend that Thomas’s ghost haunts the New Amsterdam Theatre in New York City arose in the years following her death.
- In 2004, with funding from Timeline Films, and with the help of Hugh Hefner and his film preservation organization, Sarah J. Baker premiered her documentary on Olive Thomas's life, titled Olive Thomas: Everybody's Sweetheart.
- In 2007, Michelle Vogel wrote a biography titled, Olive Thomas: The Life and Death of a Silent Film Beauty, published by McFarland Publishing Company.
- Ghostlight, a musical about the life of Olive Thomas, was written by Matthew Martin and Tim Realbuto. Ghostlight opened in New York City at the Signature Theatre on September 26, 2011, and was presented by the New York Musical Theatre Festival. It starred Drama Desk Award winner Rachel York as Billie Burke, Tony nominee Michael Hayden as Florenz Ziegfeld, Jr., Tony Award winner Daisy Eagan as Molly Cook, Kimberly Faye Greenberg as Fanny Brice, Matt Leisy as Jack Pickford, and newcomer Rachael Fogle in the leading role of Olive Thomas.
- In 2015, novelist Laini Giles released a fictionalized biography of Olive titled The Forgotten Flapper. Based completely on factual information, it goes from her poor roots in Pennsylvania to her death, and is narrated by her ghost, now haunting the New Amsterdam Theatre.

== Filmography ==
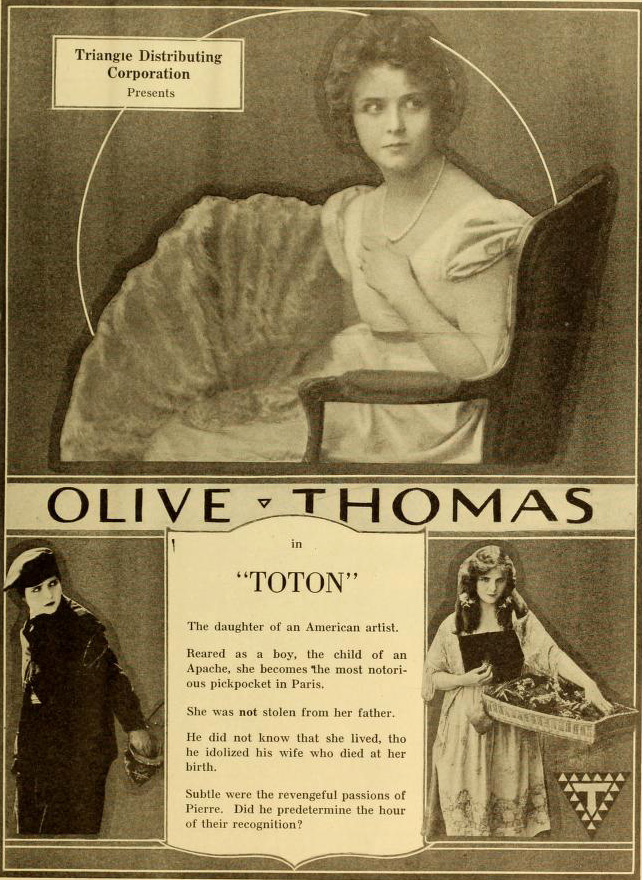
Advertisement for Toton in The Moving Picture World, 1919

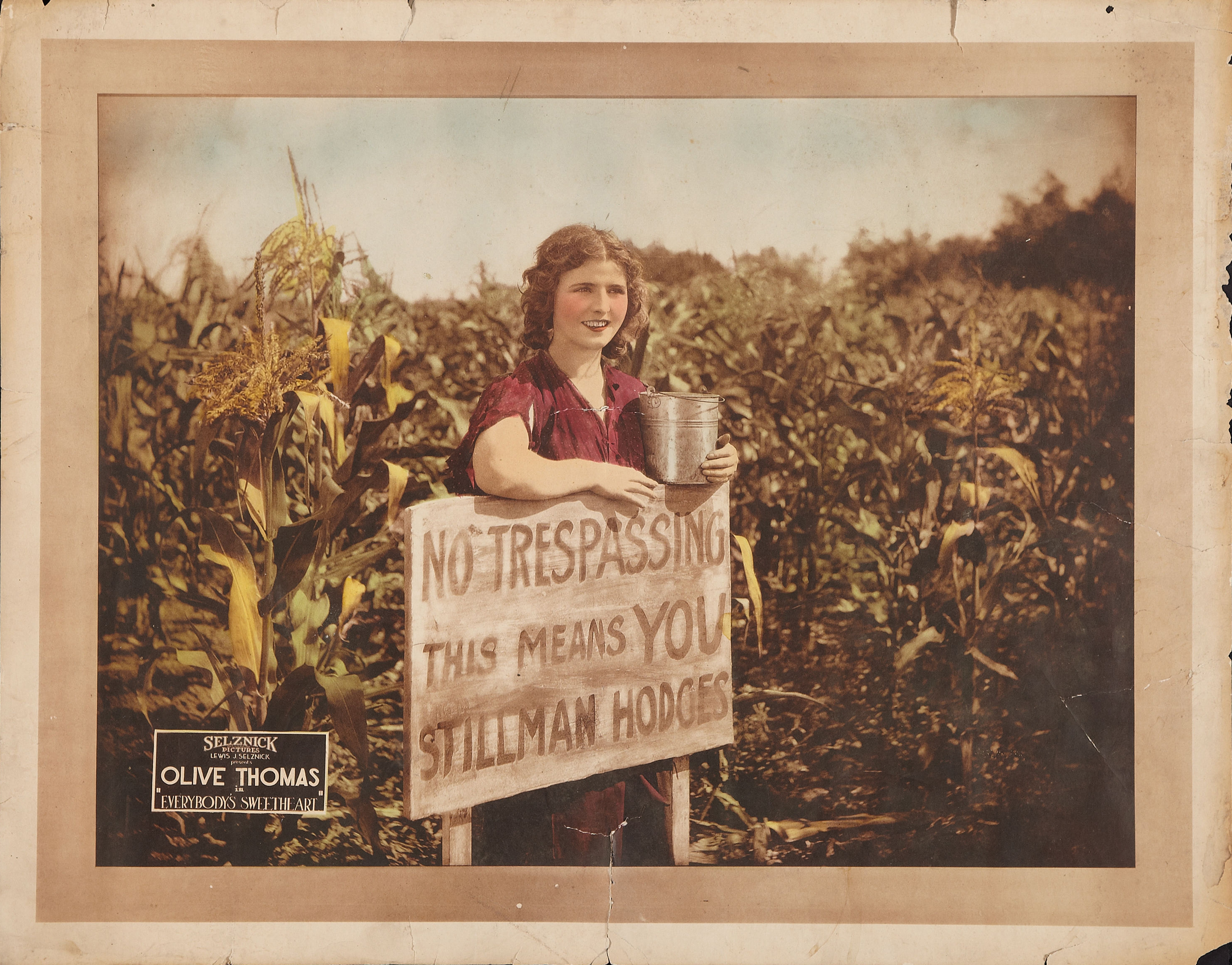
Lobby card for Everybody's Sweetheart, 1920

Year	Title	Role	Notes
1916	Beatrice Fairfax	Rita Malone	Episode 10: Play Ball
1917	A Girl Like That	Fannie Brooks	Lost film
1917	Madcap Madge	Betty	
1917	An Even Break	Claire Curtis	
1917	Broadway Arizona	Fritzi Carlyle	
1917	Indiscreet Corinne	Corinne Chilvers	
1917	Tom Sawyer	Choir Member	Uncredited
1918	Betty Takes a Hand	Betty Marshall	
1918	Limousine Life	Minnie Wills	Lost film
1918	Heiress for a Day	Helen Thurston	Lost film
1919	Toton the Apache	Toton/Yvonne	Lost film
1919	The Follies Girl	Doll	
1919	Upstairs and Down	Alice Chesterton	Alternative title: Up-stairs and Down; Lost film
1919	Love's Prisoner	Nancy, later Lady Cleveland	Incomplete film, missing final reel
1919	Prudence on Broadway	Prudence	Lost film
1919	The Spite Bride	Tessa Doyle	
1919	The Glorious Lady	Ivis Benson	
1919	Out Yonder	Flotsam	
1920	Footlights and Shadows	Gloria Dawn	Lost film
1920	Youthful Folly	Nancy Sherwin	Writer; Lost film
1920	The Flapper	Ginger King	
1920	Darling Mine	Kitty McCarthy	Lost film
1920	Everybody's Sweetheart	Mary	Released posthumously

== See also ==
- Virginia Rappe
