= David O. Selznick =

American film producer (1902–1965)

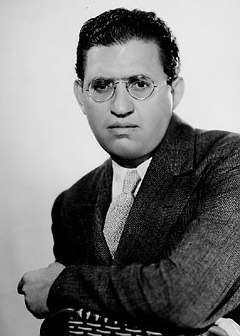
- Selznick, c. 1934
- Born: David Selznick; May 10, 1902; Pittsburgh, Pennsylvania, U.S.
- Died: June 22, 1965 (aged 63); Los Angeles, California, U.S.
- Resting place: Forest Lawn Memorial Park, Glendale, California
- Other name: Oliver Jeffries
- Occupations: Film producer; screenwriter; film studio executive
- Years active: 1923–1957
- Political party: Republican
- Spouses: Irene Mayer Selznick (m. 1930; div. 1949) Jennifer Jones (m. 1949)
- Children: 3
- Parent(s): Lewis J. Selznick; Florence Sachs
- Relatives: Myron Selznick (brother)

David O. Selznick (born May 10, 1902 – June 22, 1965) was an American film producer, screenwriter and film studio executive who produced Gone with the Wind (1939) and Rebecca (1940), both of which earned him an Academy Award for Best Picture. He also won the Irving Thalberg Award at the 12th Academy Awards, Hollywood's top honor for a producer, in recognition of his shepherding Gone with the Wind through a long and troubled production and into a record-breaking blockbuster.

The son and son-in-law of movie moguls Lewis J. Selznick and Louis B. Mayer, Selznick served as head of production at R.K.O. Radio Pictures and went on to become one of the first independent movie producers. His first wife was Mayer's daughter Irene Selznick, who became a highly successful Broadway producer after their divorce, and his second wife was Oscar-winning actress Jennifer Jones.

== Early life ==
Selznick was born in Pittsburgh, Pennsylvania, the son of Florence Anna (née Sachs) and Lewis J. Selznick, a silent film producer and distributor of Jewish origin. His father was born in the Russian Empire in 1870.

David had three siblings, including his brother Myron, also a film producer and later a talent agent. David Selznick added the "O" to distinguish himself from an uncle with the same name, and because he thought it had flair. The "O" stands for nothing, and he never had his name legally changed to incorporate it.

He studied at Columbia University in New York City and started training as an apprentice for his father until the elder's bankruptcy in 1923. In 1926, Selznick moved to Hollywood, and with the help of his father's connections, he gained a job as an assistant story editor at Metro-Goldwyn-Mayer. He left MGM for Paramount Pictures in 1928, where he worked until 1931. While at Paramount he married Irene Gladys Mayer, daughter of MGM mogul Louis B. Mayer.

== Stint at RKO ==
David Sarnoff, head of RKO, hired Selznick as Head of Production in October 1931. In addition to implementing rigorous cost-control measures, Selznick championed the unit production system, which gave the producers of individual movies much greater independence than they had under the prevailing central producer system. "Under the factory system of production you rob the director of his individualism", said Selznick, "and this being a creative industry that is harmful to the quality of the product made." Instituting unit production, he predicted, would also result in cost savings of 30–40 percent.

To make films under the new system, Selznick recruited prize behind-the-camera personnel, such as director George Cukor and producer/director Merian C. Cooper, and gave producer Pandro S. Berman, aged twenty-six, increasingly important projects. Selznick discovered and signed a young actress who was quickly counted as one of the studio's big stars, Katharine Hepburn. John Barrymore was also enlisted for a few memorable performances.

Selznick spent a mere fifteen months as RKO production chief, resigning over a dispute with new corporate president Merlin Aylesworth concerning creative control. One of his last acts at RKO was to approve a screen test for a thirty-three-year-old, balding Broadway song-and-dance man named Fred Astaire. In a memo, Selznick wrote, "I feel, in spite of his enormous ears and bad chin line, that his charm is ... tremendous".

Selznick's tenure was widely considered masterful: In 1931, before he arrived, the studio had produced forty-two features for $16 million in total budgets. In 1932, under Selznick, forty-one features were made for $10.2 million, with clear improvement in quality and popularity. He backed several major successes, including A Bill of Divorcement (1932), with Cukor directing Hepburn's debut, and the monumental King Kong (1933)—largely Merian Cooper's brainchild, brought to life by the astonishing special effects work of Willis H. O'Brien.

== Return to MGM ==
In 1933, he returned to MGM where his father-in-law, Louis B. Mayer, was studio CEO. Mayer established a second prestige production unit for Selznick, parallel to that of Irving Thalberg, who was in poor health. Selznick's unit output included the all-star cast movie Dinner at Eight (1933), David Copperfield (1935), Anna Karenina (1935), and A Tale of Two Cities (1935).

Greta Garbo's contract with MGM supposedly provided that only Selznick or Thalberg could produce her pictures for the studio. When Selznick later announced his departure from MGM, Garbo asked him to stay, offering to allow him the exclusive right to produce her films. Selznick declined the offer.

== Selznick International Pictures ==
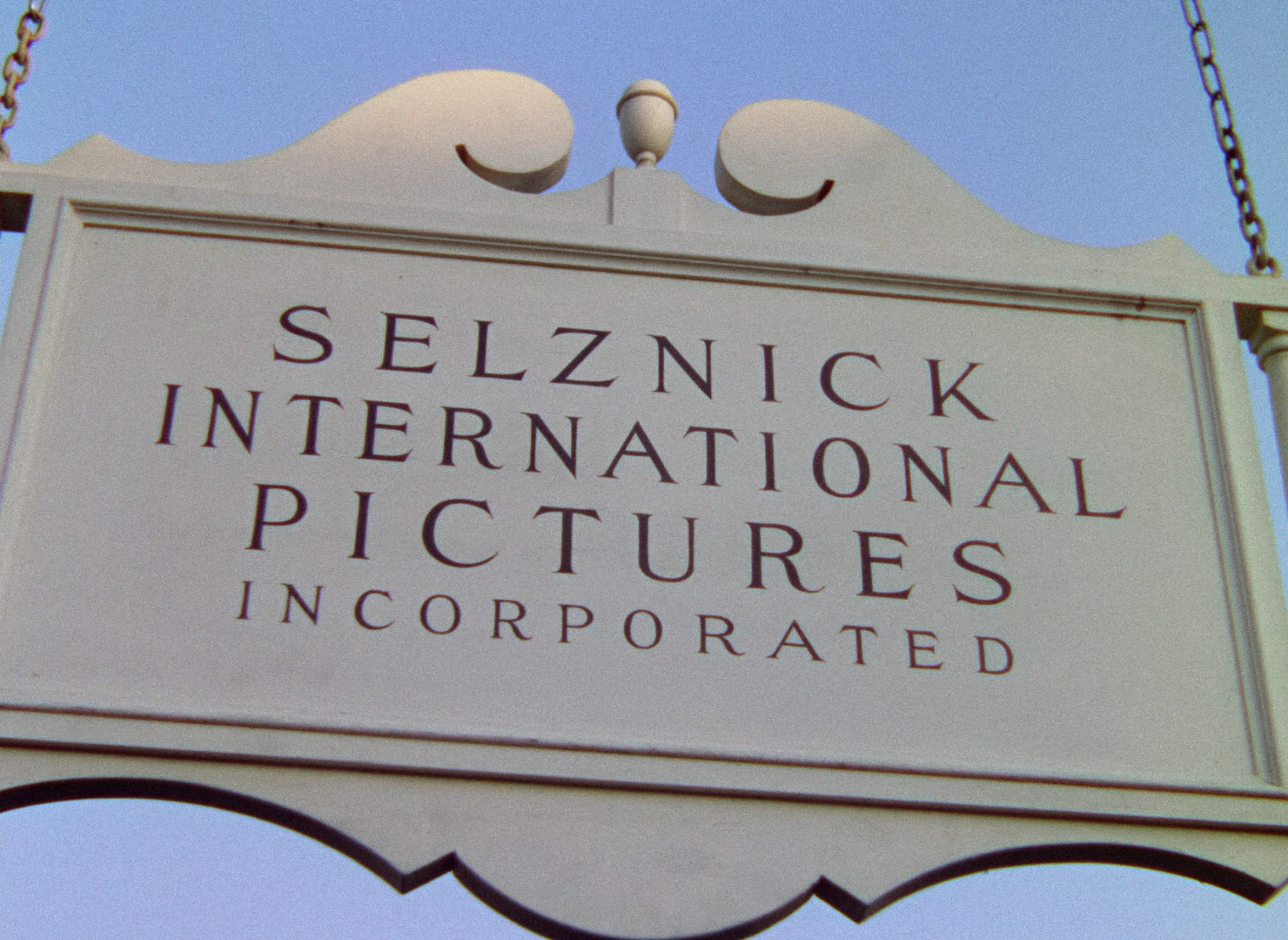
Color version of the Selznick International Pictures title screen, as seen in A Star Is Born (1937)

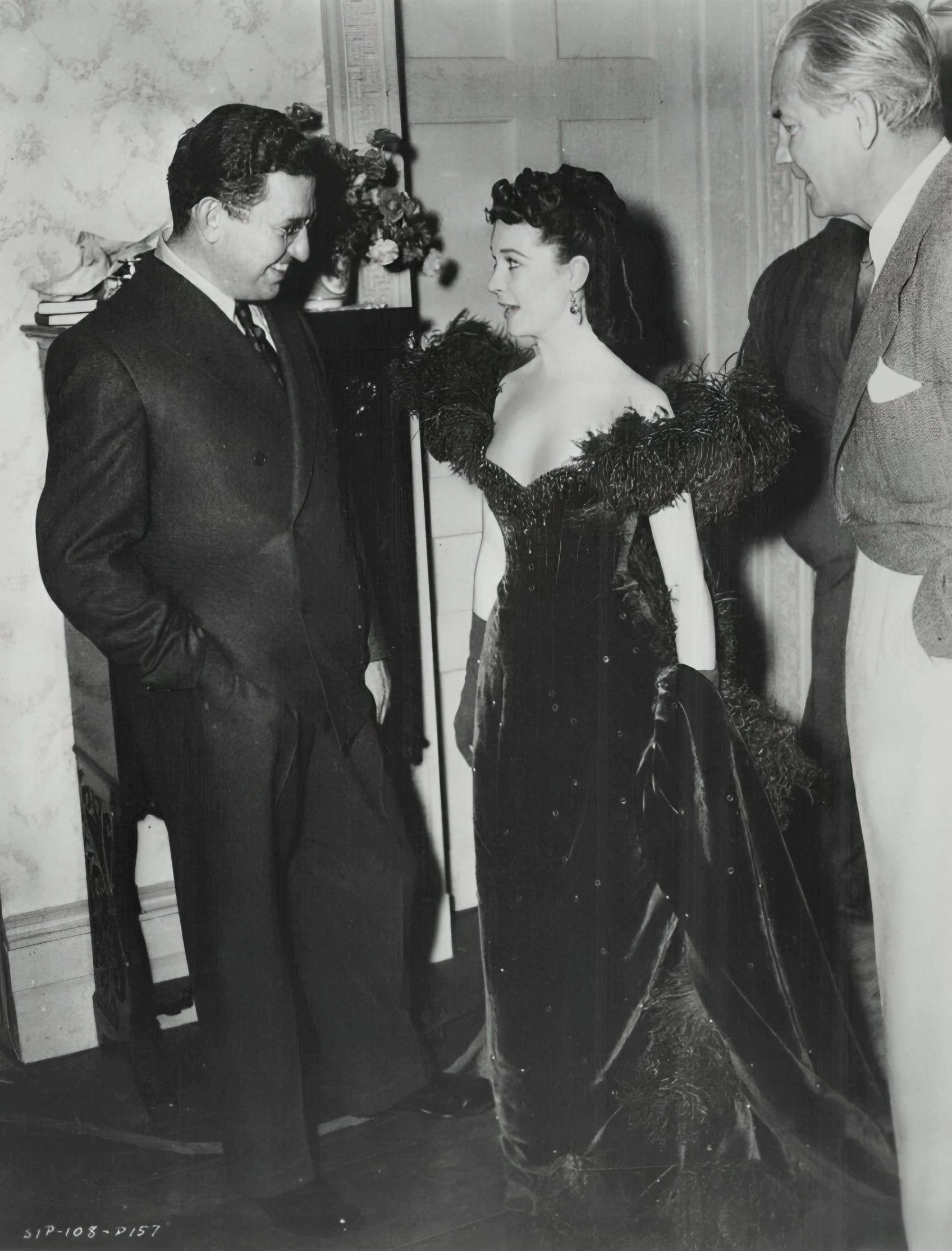
Selznick alongside Gone with the Wind lead actress Vivien Leigh and director Victor Fleming

Selznick longed to be an independent producer with his own studio. In 1935, he realized that goal by leasing RKO's Culver City studios and back lot, forming Selznick International Pictures, and distributing his films through United Artists. His successes continued with classics such as The Garden of Allah (1936), The Prisoner of Zenda (1937), A Star Is Born (1937), Nothing Sacred (1937), The Adventures of Tom Sawyer (1938), The Young in Heart (1938), Made for Each Other (1939), Intermezzo (1939) and Gone with the Wind (1939), which remains the highest-grossing film of all time (adjusted for inflation). Gone with the Wind won eight Oscars and two special awards. Selznick also won the Irving G. Thalberg Memorial Award that same year.

The following year, he produced his second-Best Picture Oscar winner, Rebecca (1940), the first Hollywood production of British director Alfred Hitchcock. Selznick had brought Hitchcock over from England, launching the director's American career. Rebecca was Hitchcock's only film to win Best Picture.

== Later productions ==
After Rebecca, Selznick closed Selznick International Pictures and took some time off. His business activities included the loan of his contracted artists to other studios, including Alfred Hitchcock, Ingrid Bergman, Vivien Leigh and Joan Fontaine. He formed The Selznick Studio and returned to producing pictures with Since You Went Away (1944), which he also wrote. He followed that with the Hitchcock films Spellbound (1945) and The Paradine Case (1947), as well as Portrait of Jennie (1948) with Jennifer Jones.

He also developed film projects and sold the packages to other producers. Among the movies that he developed but then sold was Hitchcock's Notorious (1946). In 1949, he co-produced the Carol Reed picture The Third Man with Alexander Korda.

Gone with the Wind overshadowed the rest of Selznick's career. Later, he was convinced that he had wasted his life trying to outdo it. A major effort to was Duel in the Sun (1946), which featured future wife Jennifer Jones in the role of the primary character Pearl. With a huge budget, the film is known for causing moral upheaval because of the then risqué script written by Selznick. And though it was a troublesome shoot with a number of directors, the film would be a major success. The film was the second highest-grossing film of 1947 and was the first movie that Martin Scorsese saw, inspiring Scorsese's own directorial career.

"I stopped making films in 1948 because I was tired," Selznick later wrote. "I had been producing, at the time, for twenty years....Additionally it was crystal clear that the motion-picture business was in for a terrible beating from television and other new forms of entertainment, and I thought it a good time to take stock and to study objectively the obviously changing public tastes....Certainly I had no intention of staying away from production for nine years." Selznick spent most of the 1950s nurturing the career of his second wife, Jennifer Jones. His last film, the big budget production A Farewell to Arms (1957) starring Jones and Rock Hudson, was ill-received. But in 1954, he ventured into television, producing a two-hour extravaganza called Light's Diamond Jubilee, which, in true Selznick fashion, made TV history by being telecast simultaneously on all four TV networks: CBS, NBC, ABC, and DuMont.

== Personal life ==
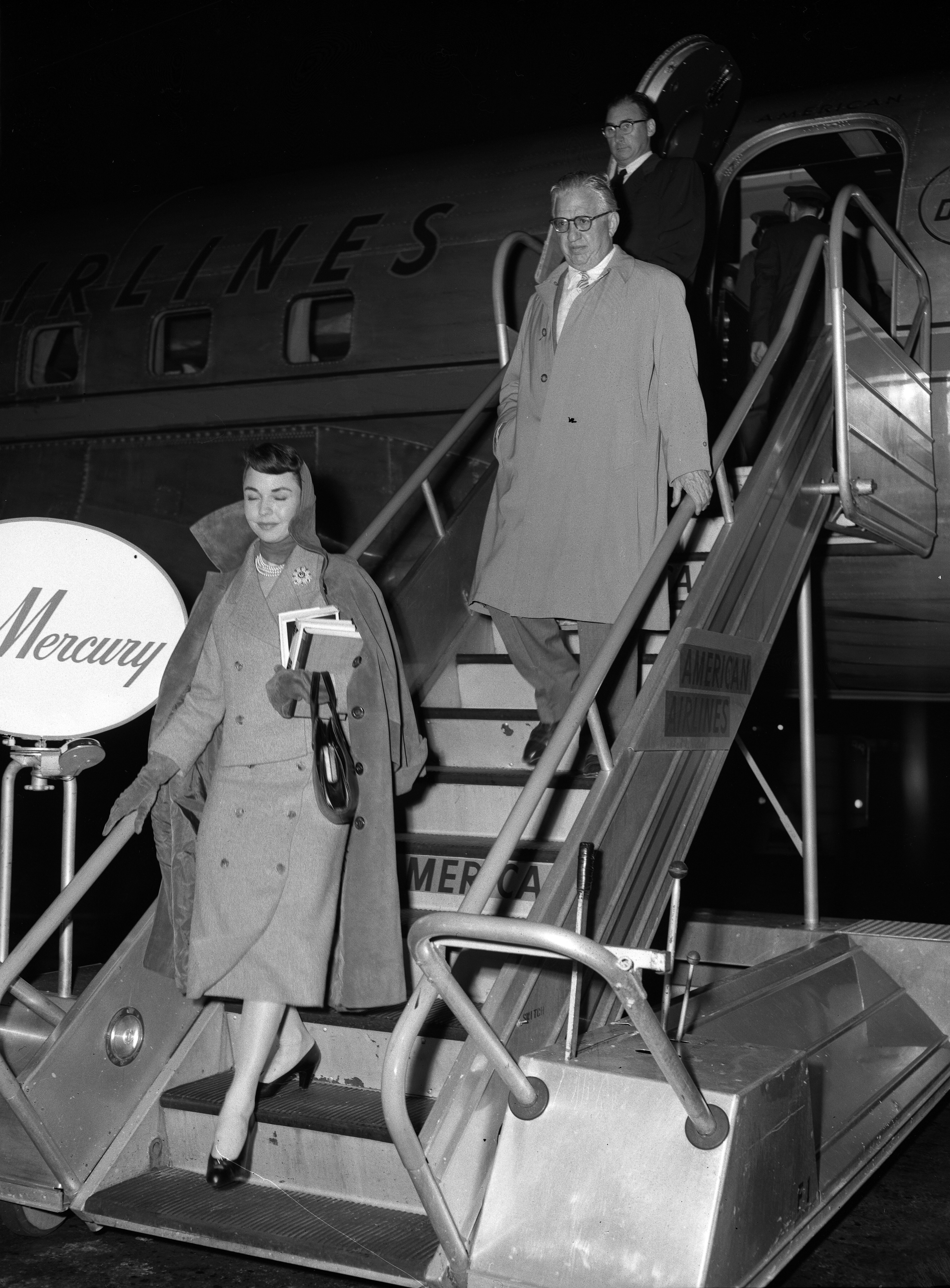
Jennifer Jones and Selznick in Los Angeles, 1957

In 1928, Selznick began an on-again off-again affair with Jean Arthur, one of the actresses under contract at Paramount while he was an executive there. Simultaneously he was dating Irene Gladys Mayer, daughter of MGM mogul Louis B. Mayer.

In 1930, Selznick married Mayer and after living in a series of rented houses they moved into an estate in Beverly Hills, California. It was purchased for them by Mayer's father and designed by architect Roland Coate in 1933–1934. They separated in 1945 and divorced in 1948. They had two sons, Jeffrey Selznick (1932–1997) and Daniel Selznick (1936–2024). Daniel, who died in August 2024, would serve as an executive at Universal Pictures for four years and also produced the television mini-series Blood Feud and Hoover vs. The Kennedys, among others, and theatrical productions such The Man with the Perfect Wife.

In 1949, he married actress Jennifer Jones, whom he had discovered early in her career and mentored. They had one daughter, Mary Jennifer Selznick (1954–1976), who died by suicide by jumping from a 22nd-floor window in Los Angeles on May 11, 1976.

Selznick was an amphetamine user, and often dictated long, rambling memos to his directors, writers, investors, staff and stars. The documentary Shadowing The Third Man relates that Selznick introduced The Third Man director Carol Reed to the use of amphetamines, which allowed Reed to bring the picture in below budget and on schedule by filming nearly 22 hours at a time.

Selznick was a Republican. On October 18, 1944, the Hollywood Committee, led by Selznick and Cecil B. DeMille, held the Hollywood for Dewey Rally in the Los Angeles Coliseum in support of the Dewey-Bricker ticket, as well as Governor Earl Warren of California, who was Dewey's running mate in 1948. The gathering drew 93,000, with Lionel Barrymore as the master of ceremonies and short speeches by Hedda Hopper and Walt Disney.

== Portrayals in film and television ==
Jonathan Shields, the lead character in the 1952 film The Bad and the Beautiful, was loosely based on Selznick, to the point that Selznick contemplated suing the makers of the film for defamation.

Tony Curtis plays Selznick in the 1980 TV movie The Scarlett O'Hara War.

Ron Berglas appears as Selznick in the TV movie RKO 281 (1999). Toby Leonard Moore plays Selznick in the 2020 film Mank. Both films are dramatizations of the events surrounding the making of Citizen Kane.

Selznick appears as a character in the second season of the anthology series Feud, Capote vs. The Swans. He is portrayed by actor Scott Zimmerman.

== Death ==
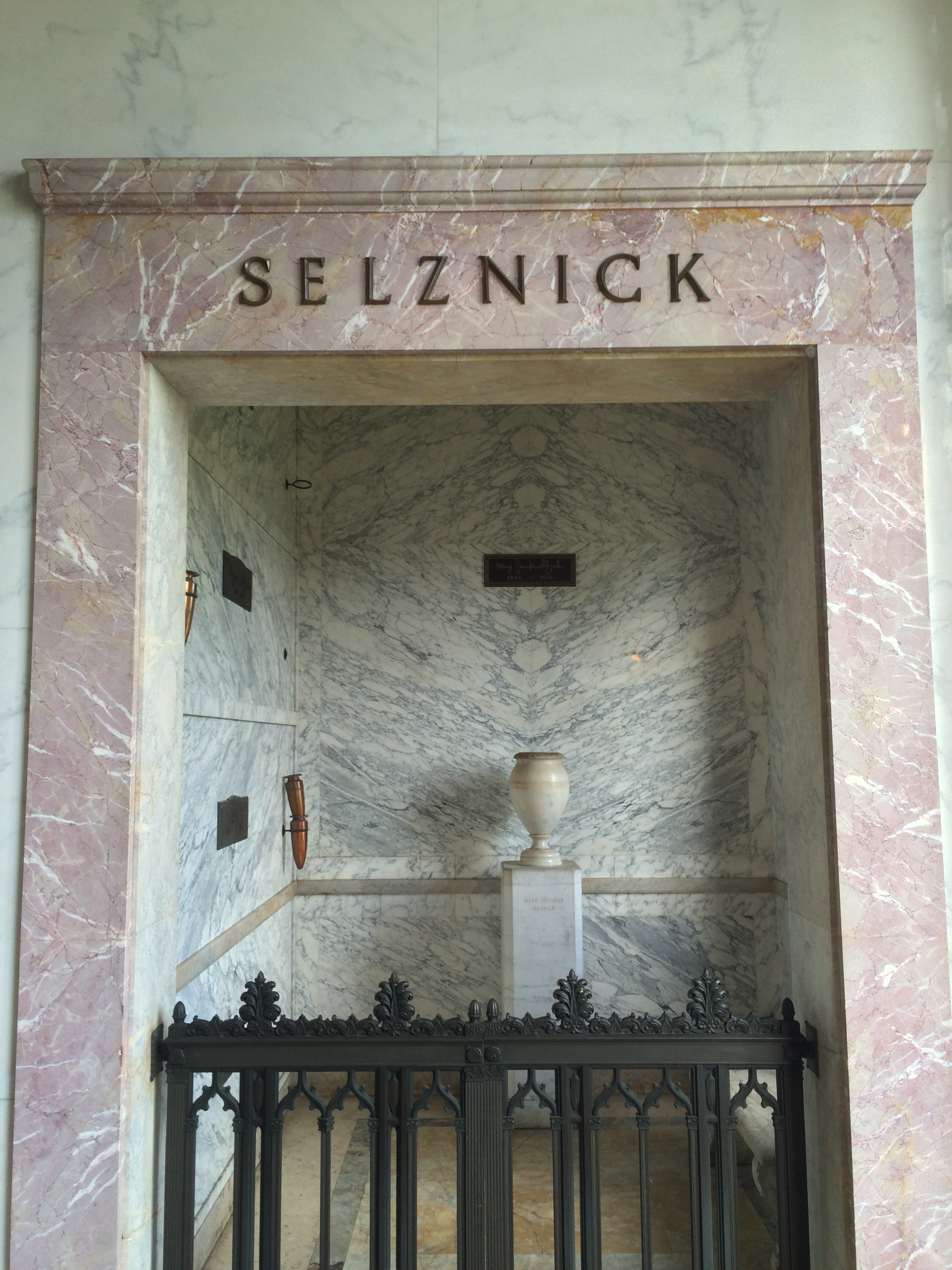
Crypt of Selznick, in the Great Mausoleum, Forest Lawn Glendale

Selznick died on June 22, 1965, at age 63 following several heart attacks, and was interred in the Forest Lawn Memorial Park Cemetery in Glendale, California. There he joined his older brother Myron Selznick (who had died in 1944) in the family crypt.

For his contribution to the motion picture industry, David O. Selznick has a star on the Hollywood Walk of Fame at 7000 Hollywood Blvd in front of the historic Hollywood Roosevelt hotel.

== Academy Awards and nominations ==
Year	Award	Title of work	Result
1934	Outstanding Production	Viva Villa!	Nominated
1935	Outstanding Production	David Copperfield	Nominated
1936	Outstanding Production	A Tale of Two Cities	Nominated
1937	Outstanding Production	A Star Is Born	Nominated
1938	Irving G. Thalberg Memorial Award		Nominated
1939	Outstanding Production	Gone with the Wind	Won
1939	Irving G. Thalberg Memorial Award		Won
1940	Outstanding Production	Rebecca	Won
1944	Best Motion Picture	Since You Went Away	Nominated
1945	Best Motion Picture	Spellbound	Nominated

== Sources ==
- Bordwell, David, Janet Staiger, and Kristin Thompson. The Classical Hollywood Cinema: Film Style & Mode of Production to 1960. New York: Columbia University Press, 1985. ISBN 0-231-06054-8
- Jewell, Richard B., with Vernon Harbin. The RKO Story. New York: Arlington House/Crown, 1982. ISBN 0-517-54656-6
- Lasky, Betty (1989). RKO: The Biggest Little Major of Them All. Santa Monica, Calif.: Roundtable. ISBN 0-915677-41-5
- Mueller, John (1986). Astaire Dancing: The Musical Films. London: Hamish Hamilton. ISBN 0-241-11749-6
- Schatz, Thomas (1998 [1989]). The Genius of the System: Hollywood Filmmaking in the Studio Era. London: Faber and Faber. ISBN 0-571-19596-2
- Thomson, David. Showman: The Life of David O. Selznick. New York: Knopf, 1992. ISBN 0-394-56833-8
