= Max Parker (art director) =

American art director (1882–1964)

- Born: July 12, 1882; Prescott, Arizona Territory
- Died: July 8, 1964 (aged 81); Torrance, California
- Occupation: Art director
- Years active: 1916–1947
- Relatives: Jerry Vultee (son-in-law)

Max Parker (July 12, 1882 – July 8, 1964) was an American art director. He was nominated for an Academy Award in the category Best Art Direction for the film George Washington Slept Here. He worked on 86 films between 1916 and 1947. He was born in Prescott, Arizona, and died in Torrance, California.

His daughter Sylvia married aircraft designer Jerry Vultee in 1936, and they did in an air crash in 1938.

== Filmography ==
- The Victoria Cross (1916)
- The Call of the East (1917)
- The Knickerbocker Buckaroo (1919)
- The Hoodlum (1919)
- Heart o' the Hills (1919)
- His Majesty, the American (1919)
- Pollyanna (1920)
- Suds (1920)
- They Shall Pay (1921)
- Crazy to Marry (1921)
- The Road to Yesterday (1925)
- Made for Love (1926)
- The Volga Boatman (1926)
- Silence (1926)
- Her Man o' War (1926)
- Eve's Leaves (1926)
- Sunny Side Up (1926)
- Gigolo (1926)
- Bachelor Brides (1926)
- For Alimony Only (1926)
- The Clinging Vine (1926)
- Risky Business (1926)
- Turkish Delight (1927)
- Yellow Lily (1928)
- The Hawk's Nest (1928)
- Happiness Ahead (1928)
- Synthetic Sin (1929)
- On with the Show! (1929)
- Gold Diggers of Broadway (1929)
- The Public Enemy (1931)
- Gold Dust Gertie (1931)
- Night Nurse (1931)
- Chandu the Magician (1932)
- Call Her Savage (1932)
- Too Busy to Work (1932)
- The Warrior's Husband (1933)
- Hold Me Tight (1933)
- The Devil's in Love (1933)
- The Power and the Glory (1933)
- The Worst Woman in Paris? (1933)
- I Am Suzanne (1933)
- Grand Canary (1934)
- Springtime for Henry (1934)
- The White Parade (1934)
- Helldorado (1934)
- Here's to Romance (1935)
- Redheads on Parade (1935)
- The Gay Deception (1935)
- Colleen (1936)
- Sons o' Guns (1936)
- Satan Met a Lady (1936)
- China Clipper (1936)
- Give Me Your Heart (1936)
- Gold Diggers of 1937 (1936)
- Green Light (1937)
- Marked Woman (1937)
- Over the Goal (1937)
- Mountain Justice (1937)
- The Singing Marine (1937)
- Marry the Girl (1937)
- That Certain Woman (1937)
- Love Is on the Air (1937)
- West of Shanghai (1937)
- The Adventurous Blonde (1937)
- First Lady (1937)
- Sh! The Octopus (1937)
- The Kid Comes Back (1938)
- A Slight Case of Murder (1938)
- Women Are Like That (1938)
- Men Are Such Fools (1938)
- My Bill (1938)
- Four's a Crowd (1938)
- Brother Rat (1938)
- Torchy Runs for Mayor (1939)
- Naughty but Nice (1939)
- Each Dawn I Die (1939)
- Devil's Island (1939)
- The Adventures of Jane Arden (1939)
- The Roaring Twenties (1939)
- Invisible Stripes (1939)
- It All Came True (1940)
- Brother Orchid (1940)
- My Love Came Back (1940)
- Lady with Red Hair (1940)
- Honeymoon for Three (1941)
- Footsteps in the Dark (1941)
- Thieves Fall Out (1941)
- Manpower (1941)
- Blues in the Night (1941)
- All Through the Night (1942)
- Wings for the Eagle (1942)
- George Washington Slept Here (1942)
- The Hard Way (1943)
- Princess O'Rourke (1943)
- Arsenic and Old Lace (1944)
- Here Come the Co-Eds (1945)
- Pride of the Marines (1945)
- Nobody Lives Forever (1946)
- Cloak and Dagger (1946)
- The Big Sleep (1946)
- Of Human Bondage (1946)
- Three Strangers (1946)
- Deep Valley (1947)
- Secret Beyond the Door (1947)
