= Red Dice =

1926 film

The Red Dice
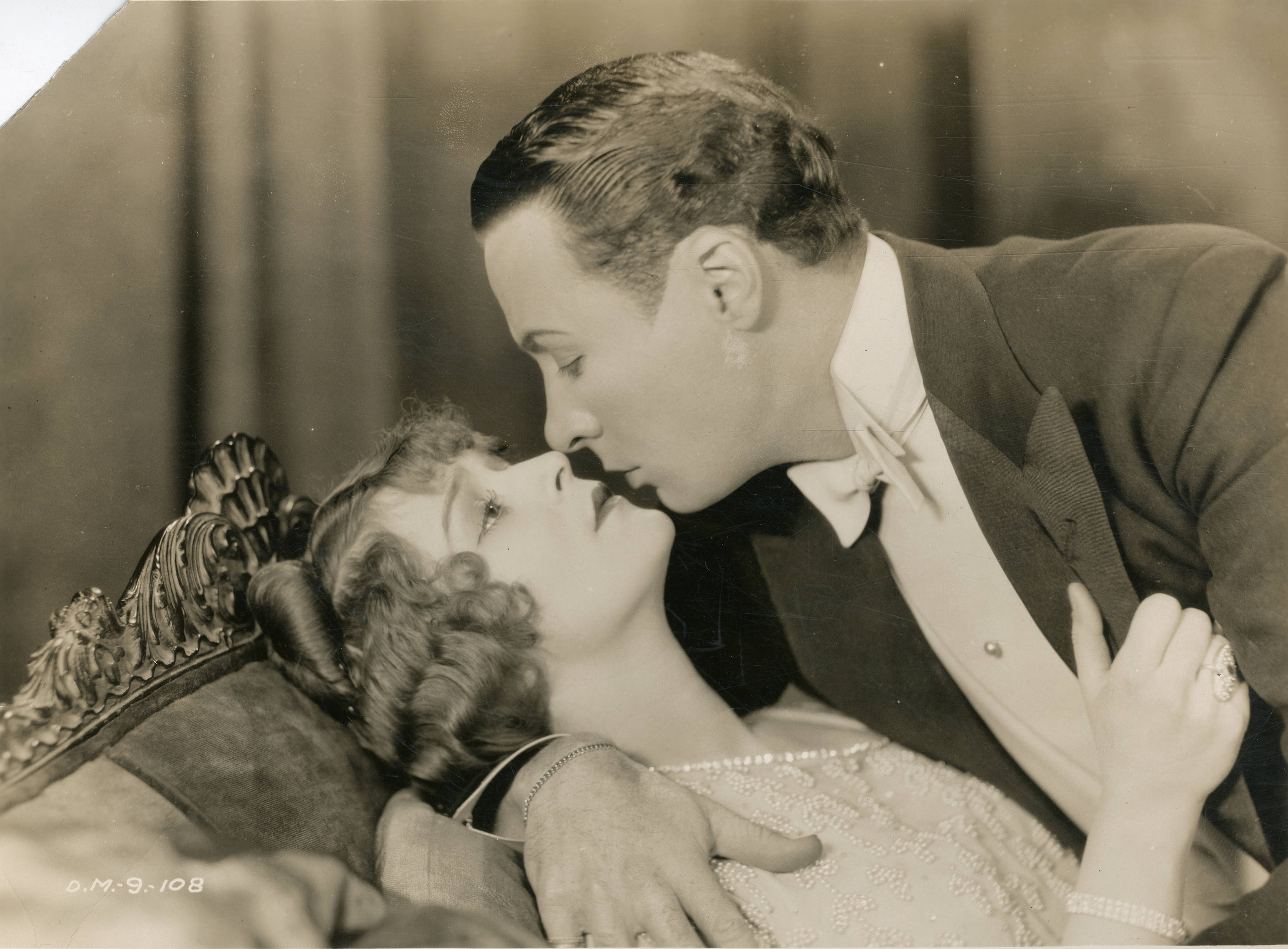
- Still with La Rocque and De La Motte
- Directed by: William K. Howard; Richard Donaldson (asst. director)
- Written by: Douglas Z. Doty; Jeanie MacPherson
- Based on: The Iron Chalice by Octavus Roy Cohen
- Produced by: DeMille Pictures Corporation
- Starring: Rod La Rocque; Marguerite De La Motte
- Cinematography: Lucien Andriot
- Production company: De Mille Pictures Corp.
- Distributed by: Producers Distributing Corporation (PDC)
- Release date: March 14, 1926
- Running time: 70 minutes
- Country: United States
- Language: Silent (English intertitles)

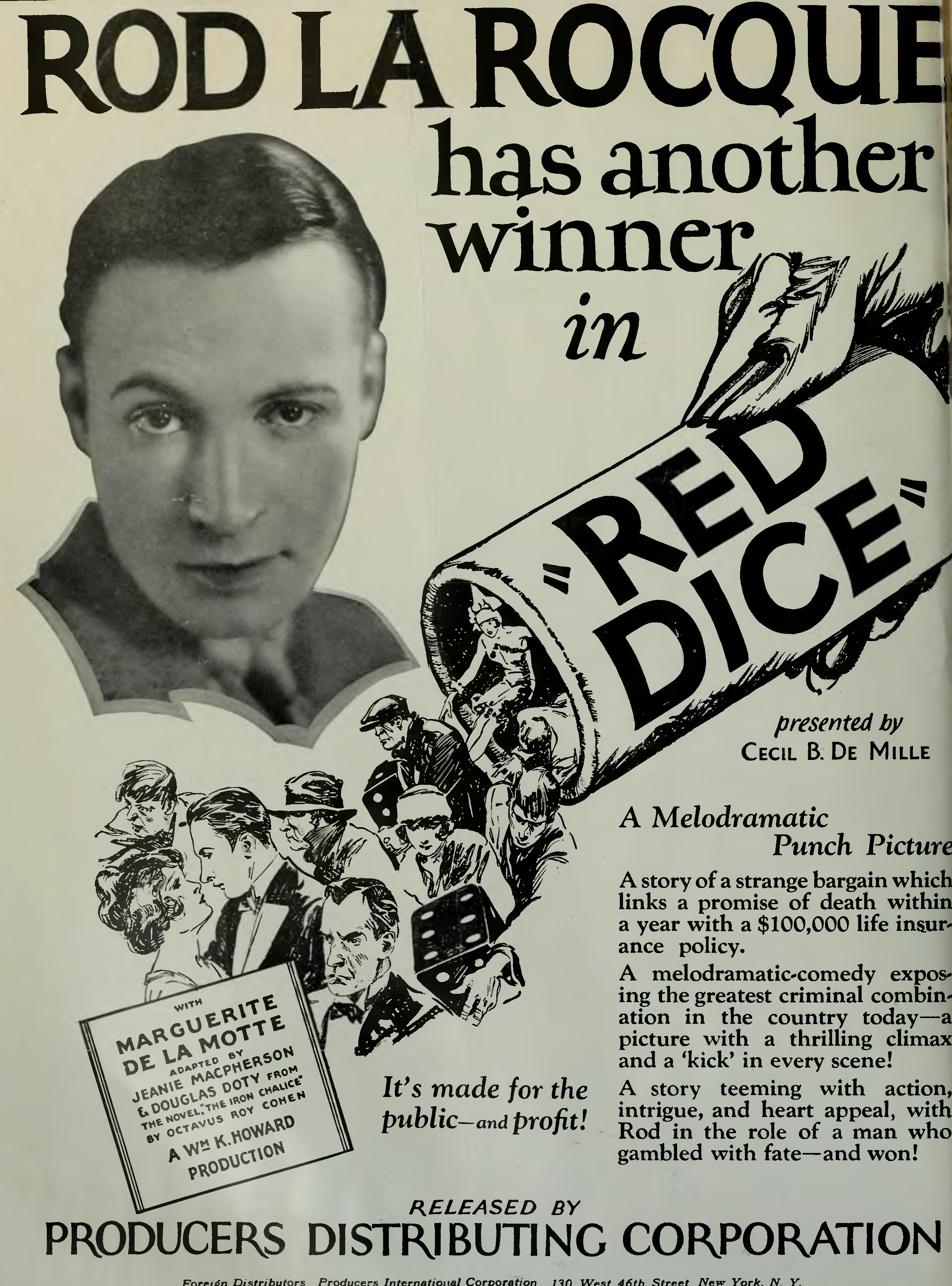
Red Dice ad in The Film Daily, 1926

The Red Dice is a 1926 American silent crime drama film directed by William K. Howard and produced by Cecil B. DeMille. It stars Rod La Rocque and Marguerite De La Motte and was released through Producers Distributing Corporation. Art direction for the film was done by Max Parker. The film was adapted by Jeanie MacPherson and Douglas Z. Doty from the 1925 Octavus Roy Cohen novel The Iron Chalice. The novel was adapted again in 1931 as The Big Gamble.

== Plot ==
As described in a film magazine review, Alan Beckwith, who is broke, agrees to insure his life naming bootleg king Andrew North beneficiary, and agreeing to commit suicide later. Ala rolls a pair of red dice to determine the date he will die. He weds Beverly Vane, a woman of North's choosing whose brother Johnny is in North's power. Alan and Beverly fall in love. He and Johnny plot to seize one of North's rum cargoes. They are trapped by North and his men, but Beverly appears in time with revenue officers. The North gang is arrested. Beverly and Alan face a happy future together.

== Cast ==
- Rod La Rocque as Alan Beckwith
- Marguerite De La Motte as Beverly Vane
- Ray Hallor as Johnny Vane
- Gustav von Seyffertitz as Andrew North
- George Cooper as Squint Scoggins
- Walter Long as Nick Webb
- Edith Yorke as Mrs. Garrison
- Clarence Burton as Butler
- Charles Clary as District Attorney
- Alan Brooks as Conroy

== Preservation ==
With no prints of Red Dice located in any film archives, it is considered a lost film. In February of 2021, the film was cited by the National Film Preservation Board on their Lost U.S. Silent Feature Films list. A 48-second trailer of the film still exists.
