= Earl Montgomery =

Earl Montgomery may refer to:

- Earl Montgomery (actor) (1921–1987), American character actor of stage and screen
- Earl Montgomery (director), (1894–1966), American film director, writer, and comedian
- Earl Montgomery (songwriter) (born 1941), American songwriter

== See also ==
- Earl of Montgomery
