= Her Man o' War =

1926 film

- Directed by: Frank Urson; Roy Burns (asst. director)
- Written by: Frederick J. Jackson (story); Charles A. Logue; Jeanie MacPherson
- Produced by: C. Gardner Sullivan
- Starring: Jetta Goudal; William Boyd; Jimmie Adams
- Cinematography: J. Peverell Marley
- Production company: DeMille Pictures Corporation
- Distributed by: Producers Distributing Corporation
- Release date: August 23, 1926
- Running time: 60 minutes
- Country: United States
- Languages: Silent; English intertitles

Her Man o' War is a 1926 American silent war drama film directed by Frank Urson and starring Jetta Goudal, William Boyd and Jimmie Adams.

The film's sets were designed by the art director Max Parker.

== Synopsis ==
After being captured during World War I, an American prisoner is sent to work on a small farm run by a young woman.

== Cast ==
- Jetta Goudal as Cherie Schultz
- William Boyd as Jim Sanderson
- Jimmie Adams as Shorty Flynn
- Grace Darmond as Countess of Lederbon
- Kay Deslys as Big Bertha
- Frank Reicher as Prof. Krantz
- Michael Vavitch as Col. Prittwitz
- Robert Edeson as Field Marshall
- Frank Coghlan Jr. as Peterkin Schultz

== Preservation ==
A complete 16 mm print of Her Man o' War is held by the UCLA Film & Television Archive.

== Bibliography ==
- Goble, Alan. The Complete Index to Literary Sources in Film. Walter de Gruyter, 1999.
