= Silence (1926 film) =

1926 film

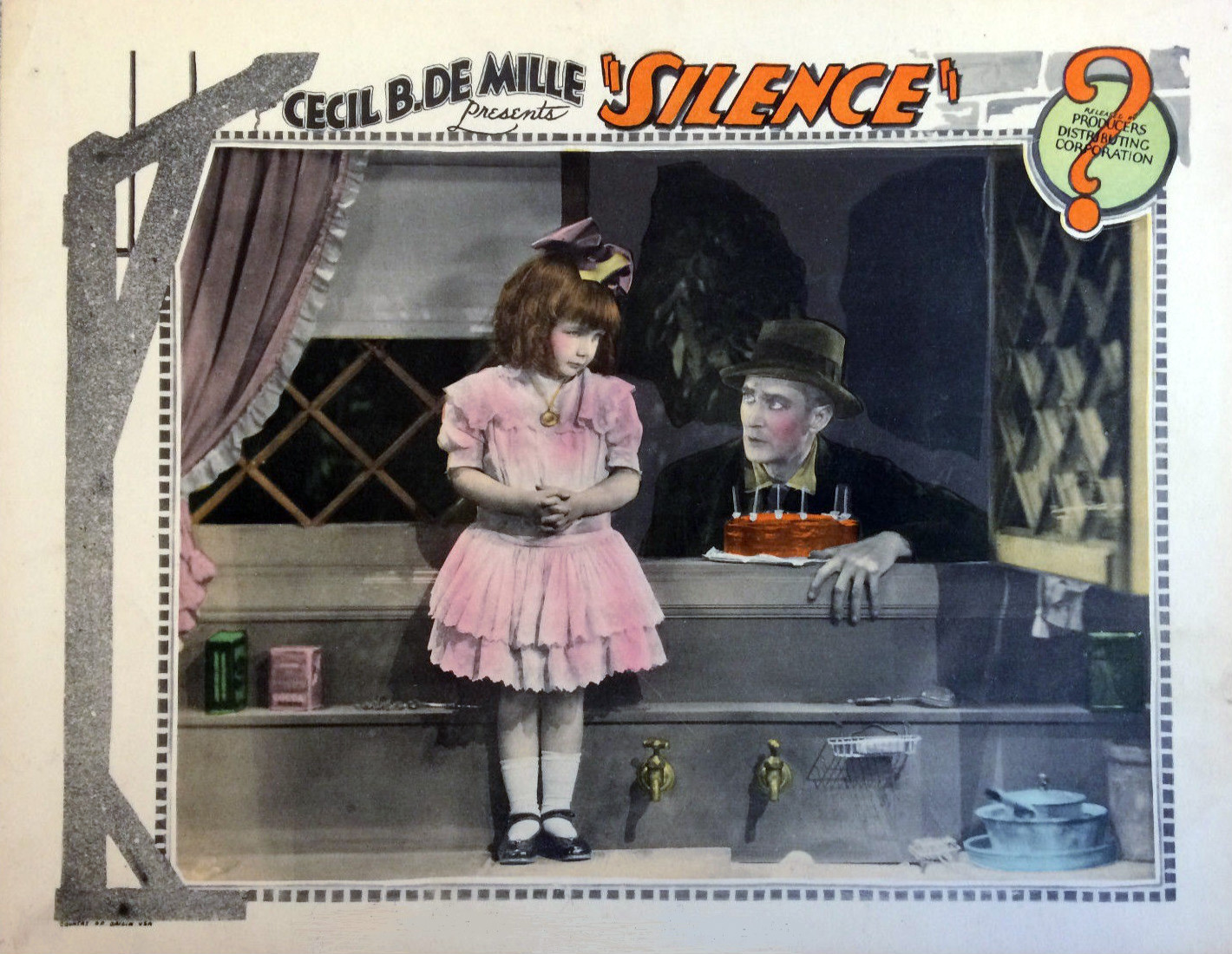
- Lobby card
- Directed by: Rupert Julian
- Written by: Beulah Marie Dix; Bertram Millhauser
- Based on: Silence by Max Marcin
- Produced by: Cecil B. DeMille
- Starring: Vera Reynolds; H.B. Warner; Raymond Hatton
- Cinematography: J. Peverell Marley
- Edited by: Claude Berkeley
- Production company: DeMille Pictures Corporation
- Distributed by: Producers Distributing Corporation
- Release date: April 25, 1926
- Running time: 80 minutes
- Country: United States
- Language: Silent (English intertitles)

Silence (1926)

Silence is a 1926 American silent crime drama film directed by Rupert Julian and starring Vera Reynolds, H.B. Warner, and Raymond Hatton. Reynolds plays a dual role of a mother and, at a later date, her daughter. Long thought lost, a print was rediscovered in 2016.

The film's sets were designed by the art director Max Parker.

== Cast ==
- Vera Reynolds as Norma Drake / Norma Powers
- H.B. Warner as Jim Warren
- Raymond Hatton as Harry Silvers
- Jack Mulhall as Arthur Lawrence
- Rockliffe Fellowes as Phil Powers
- Virginia Pearson as Millie Burke
- Violet N. Cane as Little Norma at 6 years old (uncredited)
- Vondell Darr as Flower Girl (uncredited)
- Virginia Marshall as Flower Girl (uncredited)
- Josephine Norman as Undetermined Secondary Role (uncredited)

== Preservation ==
Prints of Silence are located in the Archives du Film du CNC at Bois d'Arcy and the Cinémathèque Française in Paris.

== Bibliography ==
- Goble, Alan. The Complete Index to Literary Sources in Film. Walter de Gruyter, 1999. ISBN 9783110951943
