= The Road to Yesterday =

1925 film

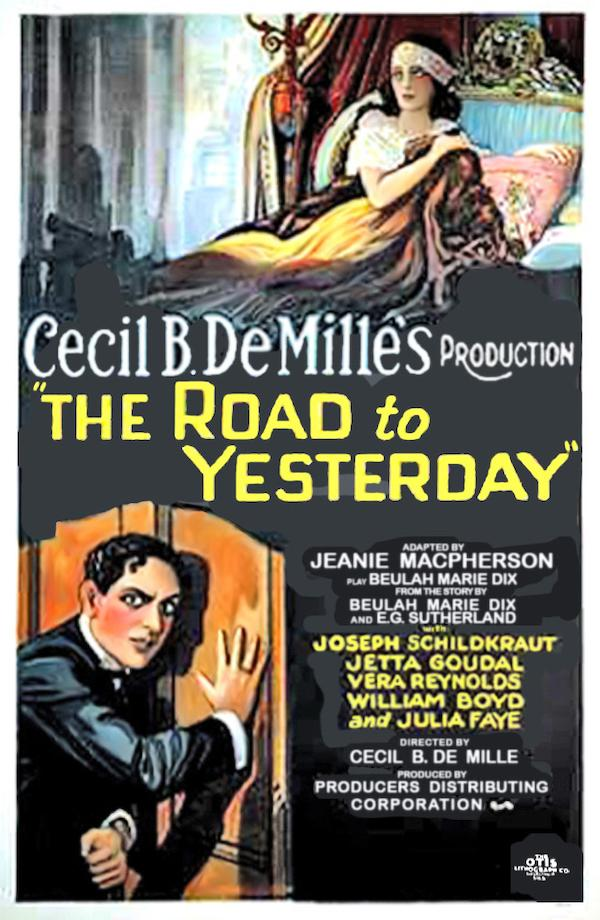
- Film poster
- Directed by: Cecil B. DeMille; Frank Urson (asst. director)
- Written by: Beulah Marie Dix; Jeanie MacPherson
- Based on: The Road to Yesterday (play) by Beulah Marie Dix; Evelyn Greenleaf Sutherland
- Produced by: Cecil B. DeMille
- Starring: Joseph Schildkraut; Jetta Goudal; Vera Reynolds
- Cinematography: J. Peverell Marley
- Edited by: Anne Bauchens
- Music by: Rudolph Berliner
- Production company: De Mille Pictures Corp.
- Distributed by: Producers Distributing Corporation
- Release date: November 15, 1925
- Running time: 107 minutes
- Country: United States
- Language: Silent (Englishbintertitles)

The Road to Yesterday is a 1925 American silent romantic drama film directed by Cecil B. DeMille. The film was based on a 1906 play of the same name by Beulah Marie Dix and Evelyn Greenleaf Sutherland, and was adapted by Dix and Jeanie MacPherson. Art direction for the film was done by Paul Iribe, Anton Grot, Mitchell Leisen, and Max Parker.

The film is significant because it was Cecil B. DeMille's first release from his new production company, DeMille Pictures Corporation. It was also upcoming actor William Boyd's first starring role. In DeMille's next picture, The Volga Boatman, which was a tremendous success, he cast Boyd as the solo leading man.

== Plot ==
The Road to Yesterday (1925)

As described in a film magazine review, Malena, a young bride, has a fear of her husband Kenneth which she cannot understand but which he attributes to his unprepossessing physical appearance. Finally, angered, the young husband leaves his wife to go to Chicago and have a physical defect overcome, if this be possible. His wife leaves on the same train. The train is wrecked and the young man rescues his wife from death. Thereafter they understand each other.

== Cast ==
- Joseph Schildkraut as Kenneth Paulton
- Jetta Goudal as Malena Paulton
- William Boyd as Jack Moreland
- Vera Reynolds as Beth Tyrell
- Trixie Friganza as Harriet Tyrell
- Casson Ferguson as Adrian Thompkyns
- Julia Faye as Dolly Foules
- Clarence Burton as Hugh Armstrong
- Charles West as Watt Earnshaw
- Josephine Norman as Anne Vener
- Wilson Benge as Kenneth's Butler (uncredited)
- Robert Brower as Elderly Party Guest (uncredited)
- Charles Clary as Doctor (uncredited)
- Iron Eyes Cody as Indian (uncredited)
- Frank Coghlan Jr. as Boy Scout (uncredited)
- Walter Long as Thug at Burning Stake scene (uncredited)
- Chester Morris as Guest
- Sally Rand (uncredited)
- Dick Sutherland as Torturer (uncredited)

== Preservation and Availability ==
Complete prints of The Road to Yesterday are held by:

- Library of Congress (on 35 mm)
- George Eastman Museum
- UCLA Film & Television Archive (on 16 mm and 35 mm)
- Academy Film Archive.

Prints also exist in private collections on 16 mm and 8mm film.

On September 24, 2013, the film was released on DVD by Alpha Video. Another DVD version was released on July 31, 2014, by The Video Cellar.
