= Prodigal Daughters =

1923 film by Sam Wood

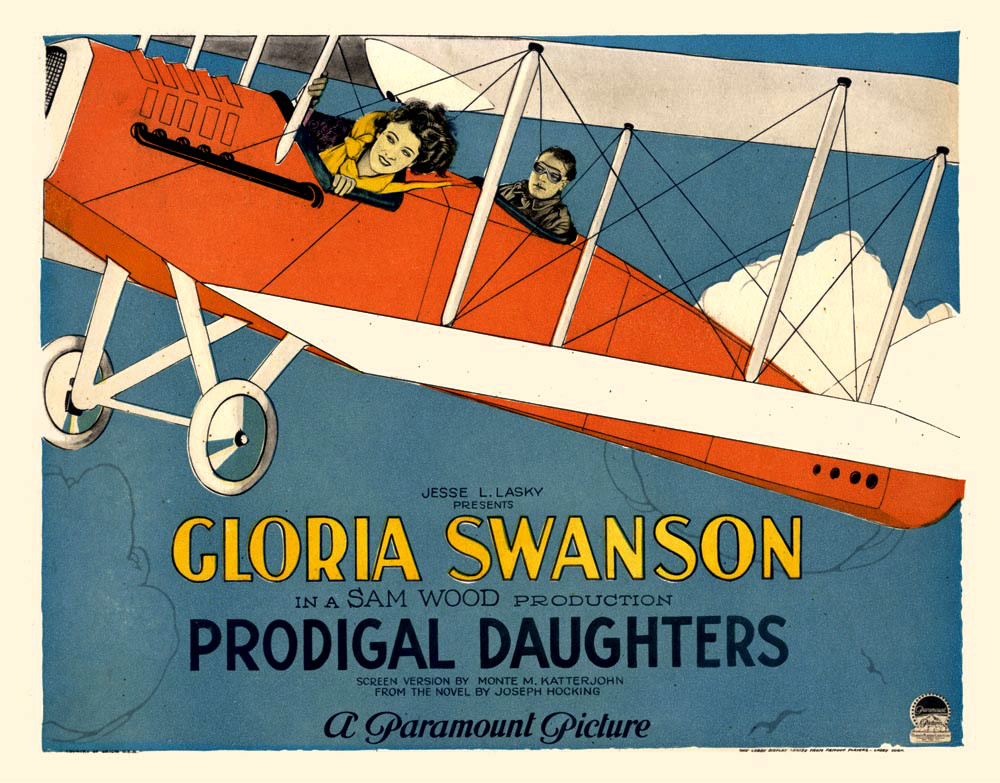
- Lobby card
- Directed by: Sam Wood
- Written by: Monte M. Katterjohn
- Based on: Prodigal Daughters by Joseph Hocking
- Produced by: Adolph Zukor; Jesse Lasky
- Starring: Gloria Swanson
- Cinematography: Alfred Gilks
- Distributed by: Paramount Pictures
- Release date: April 15, 1923
- Running time: 60 minutes
- Country: United States
- Language: Silent (English intertitles)

Prodigal Daughters is a 1923 American silent societal drama film produced by Famous Players–Lasky and distributed through Paramount Pictures. The film stars Gloria Swanson and was directed by Sam Wood. It is based on a novel of the same name by Joseph Hocking.

== Plot ==
As described in a film magazine review, Swifty Forbes becomes a flapper when her father J.D. Forbes becomes rich during the War. She lives a life of unrestrained pleasure and is loved by Roger Corbin, an aviator, and Stanley Garside, a gambler. Her sister Marjory follows the same trail and, when their father protests, they leave home to lead their own lives in Greenwich Village. Forbes, the father, in despair leaves the business in the hands of the young Corbin. Swifty loses all her money in Garside's card room and plays the cards for the cancelation of her debt against her marriage to Garside. She loses and must marry Garside within sixty days. While in the cabin of a new locomotive produced at her father's works, the thing starts and kills Garside, who was in an automobile. She ends up rescued by Corbin, who goes after her in an airplane and the two marry.

== Cast ==
- Gloria Swanson as Elinor "Swifty" Forbes
- Ralph Graves as Roger Corbin
- Vera Reynolds as Marjory Forbes
- Theodore Roberts as J.D. Forbes
- Louise Dresser as Mrs. Forbes
- Charles Clary as Stanley Garside
- Robert Agnew as Lester Hodge
- Maude Wayne as Connie
- J. Jiquel Lanoe as Juda Botanya
- Eric Mayne as Dr. Marco Strong
- Antonio Corsi as Undetermined role
- Mervyn LeRoy as Newsboy (uncredited)

== Production ==
Some portions of this film were shot in Swanson's own palatial Hollywood mansion. A young and then unknown Mervyn LeRoy appears unbilled as a newsboy. He later directed Swanson in her early talkie Tonight or Never.

== Preservation ==
With no prints of Prodigal Daughters located in any film archives, it is a lost film.
