= Risky Business (1926 film) =

1926 film by Alan Hale

- Directed by: Alan Hale
- Written by: Beulah Marie Dix
- Based on: a short story Pearls before Cecily by Charles William Brackett
- Produced by: Cecil B. DeMille
- Cinematography: James Diamond
- Edited by: Claude Berkeley
- Distributed by: Producers Distributing Corporation
- Release date: October 4, 1926
- Running time: 86 minutes
- Country: USA
- Language: Silent..English titles

Risky Business is a 1926 American silent comedy romance film directed by Alan Hale and starring Vera Reynolds, Ethel Clayton and ZaSu Pitts. It was produced by Cecil B. DeMille's Producers Distributing Corporation.

Prints are preserved of the film and it is available on the DVD home video.

== Cast ==
- Vera Reynolds as Cecily Stoughton
- Ethel Clayton as Mrs. Stoughton
- Kenneth Thomson as Ted Pyncheon, M.D.
- Ward Crane as Richard Coults-Browne
- Louis Natheaux as Lawrence Wheaton
- ZaSu Pitts as Agnes Wheaton
- Dorothy Brock as Sally, the Cream of Wheatons
- George Irving as Schubal Peabody
- Louise Cabo as Hefty Helga
