= Tonight at Twelve =

1929 film

- Directed by: Harry A. Pollard
- Screenplay by: Matt Taylor; Harry A. Pollard; Owen Davis
- Based on: Tonight at 12 by Owen Davis
- Produced by: Harry A. Pollard
- Starring: Madge Bellamy; Robert Ellis; Margaret Livingston; Vera Reynolds; Norman Trevor; Hallam Cooley
- Cinematography: Jerome Ash
- Edited by: Maurice Pivar
- Production company: Universal Pictures
- Distributed by: Universal Pictures
- Release date: September 29, 1929
- Running time: 78 minutes
- Country: United States
- Language: English

Tonight at Twelve is a 1929 American drama film directed by Harry A. Pollard and written by Matt Taylor, Harry A. Pollard and Owen Davis. It is based on the 1928 play Tonight at 12 by Owen Davis. The film stars Madge Bellamy, Robert Ellis, Margaret Livingston, Vera Reynolds, Norman Trevor and Hallam Cooley. The film was released on September 29, 1929, by Universal Pictures.

== Cast ==
- Madge Bellamy as Jane Eldridge
- Robert Ellis as Jack Keith
- Margaret Livingston as Nan Stoddard
- Vera Reynolds as Barbara Warren
- Norman Trevor as Prof. Eldridge
- Hallam Cooley as Bill Warren
- Mary Doran as Mary
- George J. Lewis as Tony Keith
- Madeline Seymour as Alice Keith
- Josephine Brown as Dora Eldridge
- Don Douglas as Tom Stoddard
- Louise Carver as Ellen
- Nick Thompson as Joe

== See also ==
- List of early sound feature films (1926–1929)
