= Corporal Kate =

1926 film

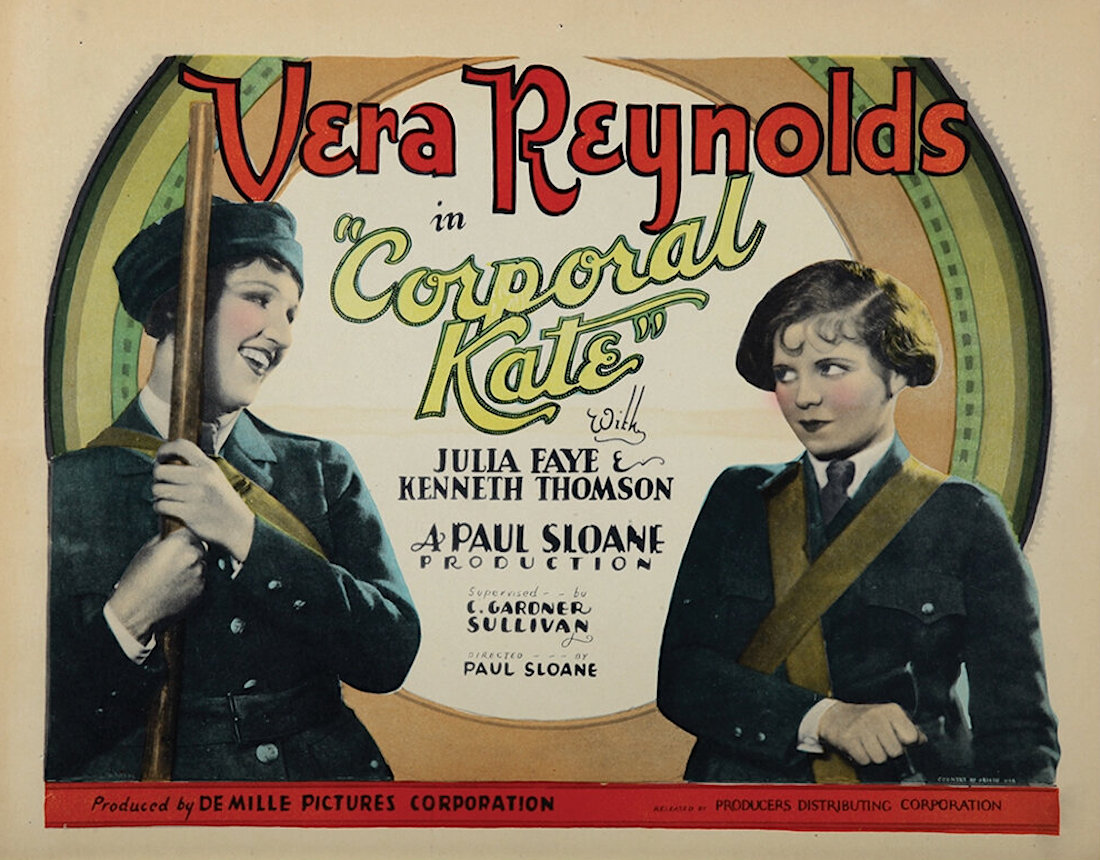
- Lobby card
- Directed by: Paul Sloane
- Written by: Albert Shelby Le Vino; John Krafft(titles)
- Based on: an original story by Zelda Sears and Marion Orth
- Produced by: C. Gardner Sullivan
- Starring: Vera Reynolds; Julia Faye
- Cinematography: Henry Cronjager
- Production company: De Mille Pictures Corp.
- Distributed by: Producers Distributing Corporation
- Release date: December 6, 1926
- Running time: 1hr. 20mins; 8 reels
- Country: United States
- Language: Silent (English intertitles)

Corporal Kate is a 1926 American silent romantic comedy film directed by Paul Sloane and starring Vera Reynolds and Julia Faye. The film was produced by C. Gardner Sullivan, with production at De Mille Pictures Corp., and released by Producers Distributing Corporation.

== Plot ==
In World War I, Brooklyn manicurists Kate Jones and Becky Finkelstein, work up a song-and-dance act that they intend to take overseas to entertain the troops. Through the influence of a friend, the girls are assigned to the French front. Both girls fall in love with Jackson Clarke, a rich playboy, who is in the American Expeditionary Forces, along with Williams, his valet. Evelyn, a friend of Jackson's, also goes to France as a Red Cross nurse, Jackson falls for Kate and is jealous of Evelyn, but, unknown to any of them, Evelyn loves an American aviator. When the Germans advance, Becky is killed, dying in Jackson's arms. Kate loses her arm in a selfless and heroic action, and Jackson, still greatly in love with her, proposes that they spend the rest of their lives together.

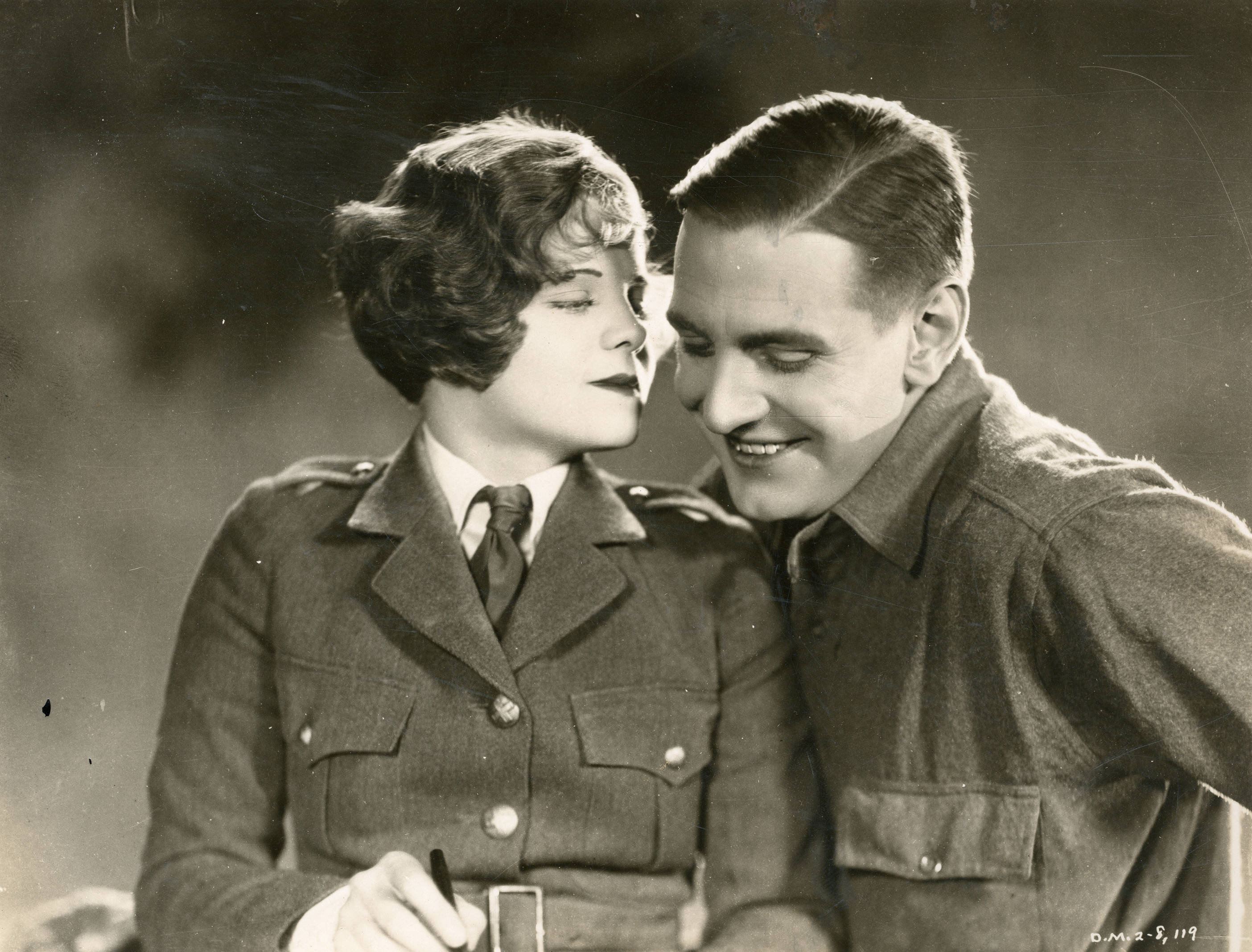
Still with Vera Reynolds and Kenneth Thomson

== Cast ==
- Vera Reynolds as Kate Jones
- Kenneth Thomson as Jackson Clarke (credited as Kenneth Thompson)
- Julia Faye as Becky Finkelstein
- Majel Coleman as Evelyn Page
- Harry Allen as Williams, Clarke's Valet
- Walter Tennyson as Captain Sir Howard Wellington
- Fred Kelsey as Unsympathetic Sergeant (uncredited)
- Scott Seaton as Colonel (uncredited)
- Harry Semels as Doughboy (uncredited)

== Production ==
Although not directly an aviation film, Corporal Kate featured a number of stunt pilots, including Frank Clarke and Leo Nomis flying a Standard L 6 and Thomas-Morse aircraft. (Note: For Cecil B. DeMille, Corporal Kate was, in part, a showcase for Julia Faye, DeMille's longtime "secret" girlfriend.)

== Reception ==
Film reviewer Hal Erickson, in his review of Corporal Kate, noted, the girls "...encounter all manner of merry misadventures. Things get serious, however, when both Kate and Becky fall in love with the same doughboy, Private Jackson (Kenneth Thompson). This romantic triangle is rather bluntly resolved when tragedy strikes on the battlefield." However, while the depiction of the relationship between the two women in a war zone is to be commended, modern viewers may be less comfortable with the many scenes featuring overt sexual harassment by the male lead.

== Preservation ==
Corporal Kate is preserved in the Library of Congress collection and UCLA Film and Television Archive.
