= Producers Distributing Corporation =

Film distribution company

Producers Distributing Corporation (PDC) was a short-lived Hollywood film distribution company, organized in 1924 (102 years ago) and dissolved in 1927 (99 years ago). In its brief heyday, film director Cecil B. DeMille was its primary talent and owner of its Culver City–located production facility.

== Corporate history ==
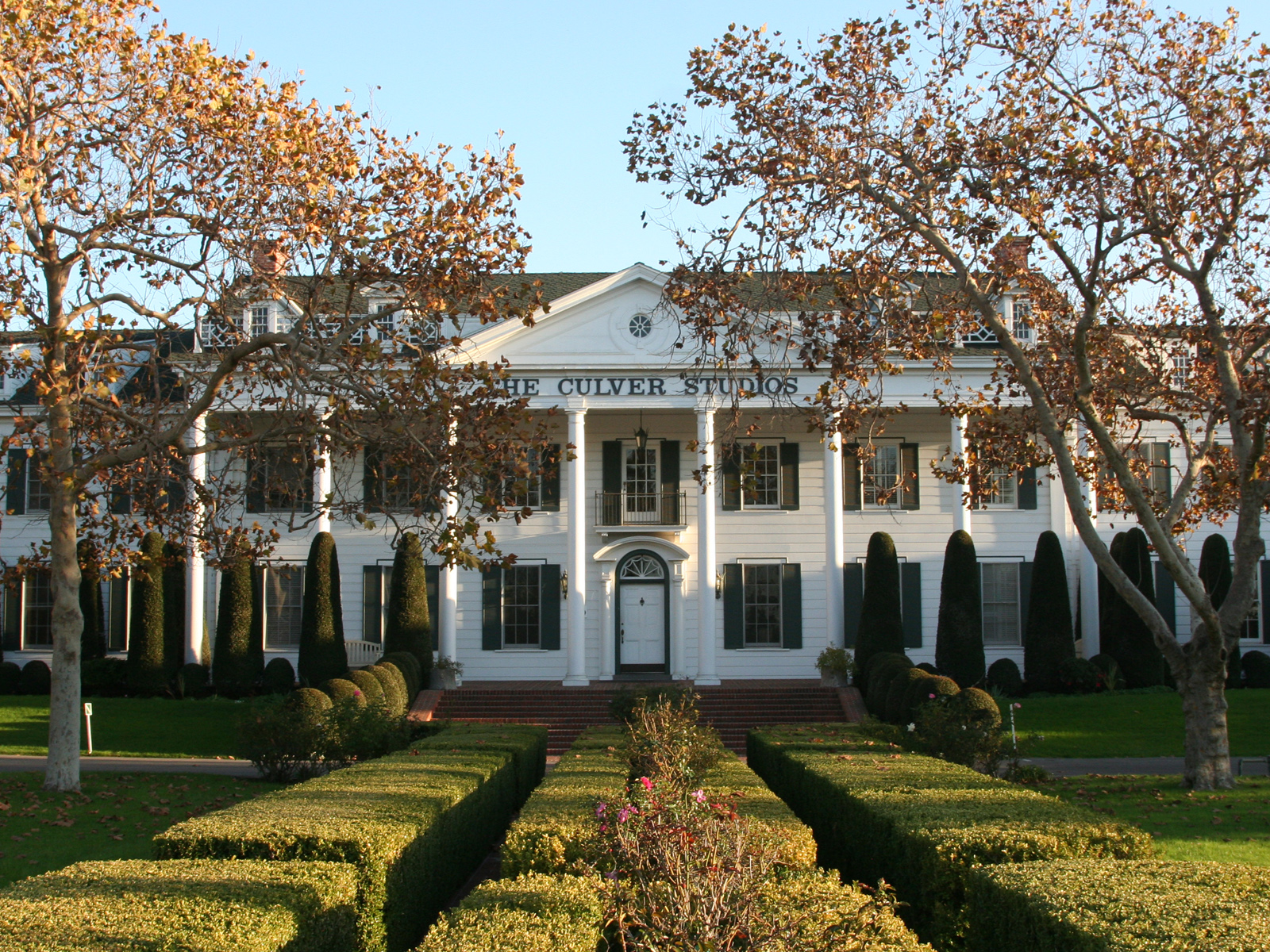
The Mansion at Culver Studios, later the logo for Selznick International Pictures

PDC's beginnings lay with film pioneer William Wadsworth Hodkinson, founder of Paramount Pictures in 1912. In late 1924 Hodkinson sold one of his struggling distribution companies to Jeremiah Millbank, a "wealthy, extremely religious, and politically conservative financier." Millbank partnered with DeMille and renamed the company Producers Distributing Corporation. Part of Millbank's investment went to purchase the former Thomas H. Ince Culver Studios, the property whose main building is a replica of Mount Vernon.

In March 1927, the small Pathé Exchange studio and Producers Distributing Corporation merged under the control of the Keith-Albee-Orpheum (KAO) chain of theaters. In early 1928, Joseph P. Kennedy, owner of the Film Booking Offices of America (FBO) studio, took control of KAO. Later in the year, RCA, in an effort led by general manager David Sarnoff to promote the new RCA Photophone sound-on-film system, acquired and merged KAO and FBO, creating RKO Radio Pictures. Kennedy retained control of Pathé, which had assumed PDC's assets, including the Culver City studio. In January 1931, he sold Pathé to RKO and left the film business.

PDC is unrelated to the company of the same name organized by Ben Judell in 1939, and which produced four films then evolved into the Poverty Row studio Producers Releasing Corporation. PDC is also unconnected to the Producers Distribution Agency founded in 2010 by John Sloss and Bart Walker.

== Filmography ==
- The Hoosier Schoolmaster (1924) 1 reel missing
- Try and Get It (1924)
- Hold Your Breath (1924)
- Another Scandal (1924) lost
- Her Own Free Will (1924) lost
- Legend of Hollywood (1924)
- The Wise Virgin (1924)
- Welcome Stranger (1924) lost
- Another Man's Wife (1924)
- Trouping with Ellen (1924) lost
- The House of Youth (1924)
- Reckless Romance (1924)
- The Chorus Lady (1924) lost
- The Flaming Forties (1924) lost
- Roaring Rails (1924)
- The Siren of Seville (1924)
- Ramshackle House (1924) lost
- A Cafe in Cairo (1924) lost
- Barbara Frietchie (1924)
- The Mirage (1924) lost
- Chalk Marks (1924) lost
- Let Women Alone (1925)
- The Million Dollar Handicap (1925)
- On the Threshold (1925)
- The Crimson Runner (1925)
- Friendly Enemies (1925) lost
- Beauty and the Bad Man (1925) lost
- Stop Flirting (1925)
- Hell's Highroad (1925)
- Steel Preferred (1925) lost
- Off the Highway (1925)
- Seven Days (1925)
- The Girl on the Stairs (1925)
- Silent Sanderson (1925) lost
- The Bad Lands (1925)
- The Texas Trail (1925) lost
- Beyond the Border (1925)
- Without Mercy (1925)
- The Coming of Amos (1925)
- The Prairie Pirate (1925)
- The People vs. Nancy Preston (1925)
- Simon the Jester (1925)
- Private Affairs (1925) lost
- Her Market Value (1925)
- The Man from Red Gulch (1925)
- The Girl of Gold (1925)
- Soft Shoes (1925)
- The Wedding Song (1925)
- Braveheart (1925)
- The Awful Truth (1925)
- Madame Behave (1925) incomplete
- The Road to Yesterday (1925)
- The Flame of the Yukon (1926)
- Red Dice (1926) trailer survives
- Jim, the Conqueror (1926)
- Eve's Leaves (1926)
- The Danger Girl (1926) lost
- Cruise of the Jasper B (1926)
- Pals in Paradise (1926) lost
- Fifth Avenue (1926) lost
- The Clinging Vine (1926)
- The Speeding Venus (1926)
- Her Man o' War (1926)
- West of Broadway (1926) lost
- Gigolo (1926)
- Paris at Midnight (1926)
- Wild Oats Lane (1926) lost
- For Alimony Only (1926)
- Silence (1926)
- The Dice Woman (1926) lost
- For Wives Only (1926)
- Corporal Kate (1926)
- The Sea Wolf (1926) lost
- Forbidden Waters (1926)
- The Nervous Wreck (1926)
- The Last Frontier (1926)
- Whispering Smith (1926)
- Rocking Moon (1926) lost
- Shipwrecked (1926) lost
- Three Faces East (1926)
- The Unknown Soldier (1926)
- Up in Mabel's Room (1926)
- The Volga Boatman (1926)
- Young April (1926)
- Meet the Prince (1926) lost
- Bachelor Brides (1926)
- Risky Business (1926)
- Made for Love (1926)
- The Prince of Pilsen (1926) lost
- Almost a Lady (1926)
- Sunny Side Up (1926)
- The Rejuvenation of Aunt Mary (1927) lost
- Rubber Tires (1927)
- Nobody's Widow (1927) lost
- Fighting Love (1927)
- Jewels of Desire (1927)
- Vanity (1927)
- The Little Adventuress (1927)
- Man Bait (1927) lost
- No Control (1927) lost
- The King of Kings (1927)
- The Heart Thief (1927)
- White Gold (1927)
- Getting Gertie's Garter (1927)
- The Night Bride (1927)
- The Yankee Clipper (1927)
- Turkish Delight (1927)
