= The Divine Sinner =

1928 film

- Directed by: Scott Pembroke
- Written by: Robert Dillon
- Produced by: Trem Carr
- Starring: Vera Reynolds; Nigel De Brulier; Bernard Siegel
- Cinematography: Hap Depew
- Edited by: J.S. Harrington
- Production company: Trem Carr Pictures
- Distributed by: Rayart Pictures
- Release date: July 15, 1928
- Country: United States
- Languages: Silent; English intertitles

The Divine Sinner is a 1928 American silent film directed by Scott Pembroke and starring Vera Reynolds, Nigel De Brulier, and Bernard Siegel.

This film is now lost.

== Cast ==
- Vera Reynolds as Lillia Ludwig
- Nigel De Brulier as Minister of Police
- Bernard Siegel as Johan Ludwig
- Ernest Hilliard as Prince Josef Miguel
- Hans Joby as Luque Bernstorff
- Carole Lombard as Millie Claudert
- Harry Northrup as Amb. D'Ray
- James Ford as Heinrich
- Alphonse Martell as Paul Coudert

== Bibliography ==
- Wes D. Gehring. Carole Lombard, the Hoosier Tornado. Indiana Historical Society Press, 2003.
