= Bachelor Brides =

1926 film

- Directed by: William K. Howard
- Written by: C. Gardner Sullivan; Garrett Fort
- Based on: Bachelor Brides by Charles Horace Malcolm
- Starring: Rod La Rocque; Elinor Fair; Eulalie Jensen
- Cinematography: Lucien N. Andriot
- Production company: DeMille Pictures Corporation
- Distributed by: Producers Distributing Corporation
- Release date: May 10, 1926
- Running time: 72 minutes
- Country: United States
- Language: Silent (English intertitles)

Bachelor Brides is a 1926 American silent comedy film directed by William K. Howard and starring Rod La Rocque, Elinor Fair, and Eulalie Jensen. It is based on a 1925 British-set stage play of the same name by Charles Horace Malcolm.

The film's sets were designed by the art director Max Parker.

== Plot ==
As described in a film magazine, Percy Ashfield is on the verge of marrying Mary Bowman, but her father strongly opposes the union because of Percy's peerage. As they gather at Ashfield's castle to celebrate, an unexpected turn of events unfolds: a young woman holding a baby bursts in, claiming that Percy is the father of her child through a secret marriage. A doctor corroborates her story, alleging that she is mentally unstable due to Percy's supposed infidelity. This revelation shocks everyone present, especially Percy, who has no recollection of the woman. A man arrives stating that he is a detective from Scotland Yard hired to guard the wedding gifts. Amidst the ensuing confusion, Percy realizes that both the woman and Mary's pearls have mysteriously vanished, leaving him perplexed. He later finds the supposed detective stealing the gifts, so Percy gets in touch with the real detective, and discovers that the three strangers are crooks in league with each other. The police capture the thieves and Henry Bowing gives his consent to the marriage between his daughter Mary and Percy.

== Cast ==
- Rod La Rocque as Percy Ashfield, Earl of Duncraggan
- Elinor Fair as Mary Bowing
- Eulalie Jensen as Lady Ashfield Duncraggan
- George Nichols as Henry Bowing
- Lucien Littlefield as Egbert Beamish
- Eddie Gribbon as Glasgow Willie alias Limehouse Herbert
- Julia Faye as Pansy Short
- Paul Nicholson as Jim Short alias Dr. Raymond Strang, M.D.
- Sally Rand as Maid

== Preservation ==
Prints of Bachelor Brides are in the collections of the UCLA Film & Television Archive and Cinémathèque française.

== Bibliography ==
- Goble, Alan. The Complete Index to Literary Sources in Film. Walter de Gruyter, 1999. ISBN 978-3-11-095194-3
- Munden, Kenneth White. The American Film Institute Catalog of Motion Pictures Produced in the United States, Part 1. University of California Press, 1997. ISBN 978-0-520-20970-1.
