= Without Mercy (film) =

1925 film

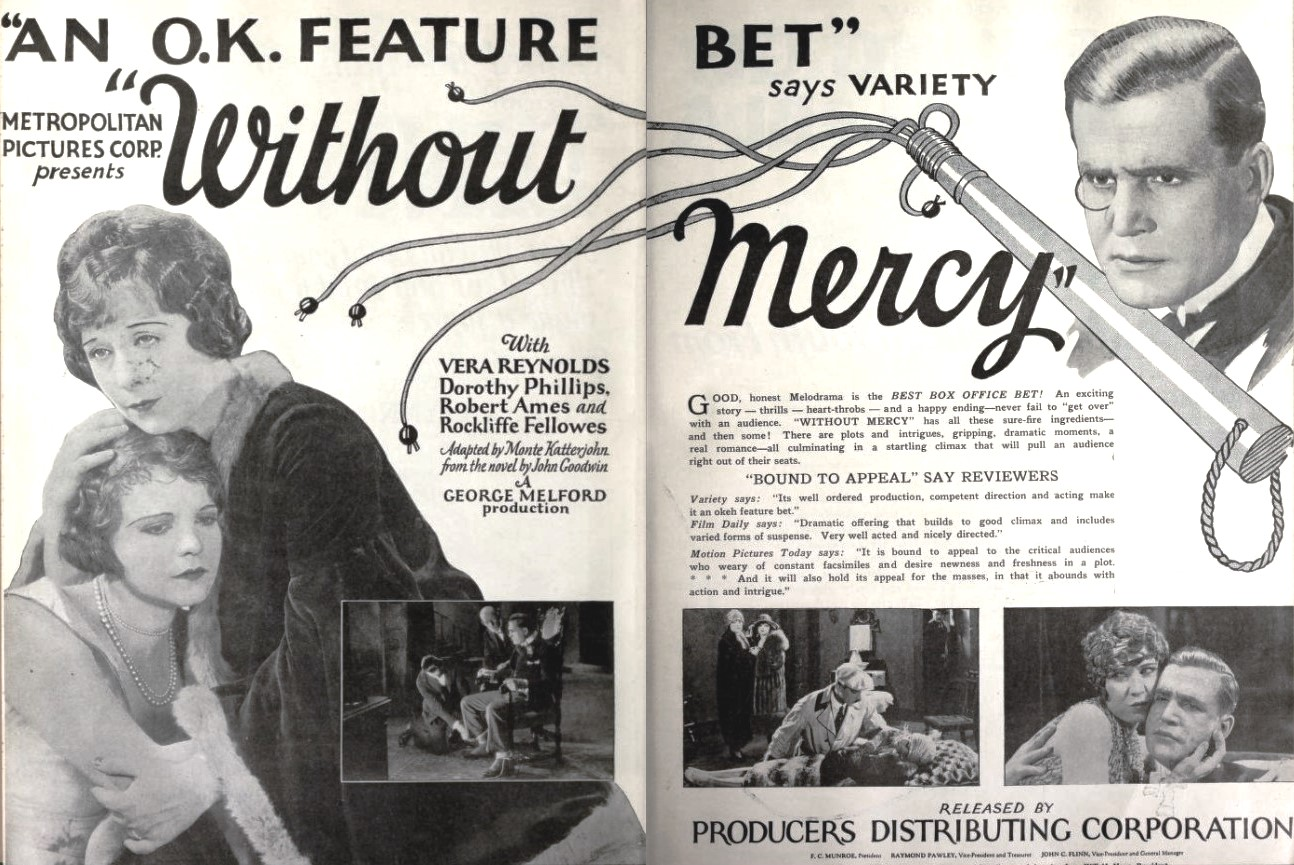
- Advertisement
- Directed by: George Melford
- Written by: Monte Katterjohn
- Based on: Without Mercy by John Goodwin
- Starring: Dorothy Phillips; Vera Reynolds
- Cinematography: Charles G. Clarke
- Production company: Metropolitan Pictures Corporation of California
- Distributed by: Producers Distributing Corporation
- Release date: October 4, 1925
- Running time: 7 reels
- Country: United States
- Language: Silent (English intertitles)

Without Mercy is a 1925 American silent melodrama film directed by George Melford and starring Dorothy Phillips and Vera Reynolds. It was distributed by Producers Distributing Corporation.

== Plot ==
As described in a film magazine reviews, Sir Melmoth Craven, a British political leader, seeks to borrow a huge amount of money to defray the expense of his election to Parliament. He is turned down by Garth and Garth, Ltd., and obtains the money from Madame Gordon, an underworld moneylender, at usurious rates. Mrs. Enid Garth, head of the former house, learns of the deal. Trouble arises when Sir Melmoth and Margaret Garth, daughter of the woman, become involved in each other. John Orme, Margaret's fiancé and also a Member of Parliament, becomes disgruntled. Mrs. Garth enters the scene and orders Melmoth to leave. When she learns of her daughter's infatuation with Melmoth, she proves to Margaret that Melmoth is a beast by showing her shoulders, which bear the scars made by Melmoth twenty years earlier. John and Melmoth become political opponents in the election. Melmoth wins and then accuses his opponent of fraud, and John is put in jail. Melmoth expects to win Margaret, but at this time he is asked to pay back his loan. He kidnaps Margaret and places her on a barge with dynamite. John gets out of jail in time to swim to the barge where he rescues Margaret just in time to save her from being blown into atoms. Melmoth is apprehended and convicted of his crimes.

== Cast ==
- Dorothy Phillips as Mrs. Enid Garth
- Rockliffe Fellowes as Sir Melmoth Craven
- Vera Reynolds as Margaret Garth
- Robert Ames as John Orme, M.P.
- Lionel Belmore as Honest Tom Massingham
- Patricia Palmer as Natalie
- Fred Malatesta as Ducrow
- Sidney D'Albrook as Sugden, Craven's Butler
- Eugene Pallette as Simon Linke
- Tempe Pigott as Madame Gordon

unbilled

- Wilson Benge as Mrs. Garth's Butler
- Gino Corrado as Malay Jack
- Boris Karloff as Madame Gordon's 2nd Henchman
- Lon Poff as Madame Gordon's 1st Henchman

== Preservation status ==
A print of Without Mercy is held at the UCLA Film and Television Archive.
