= Seven Days (1925 film) =

1925 film

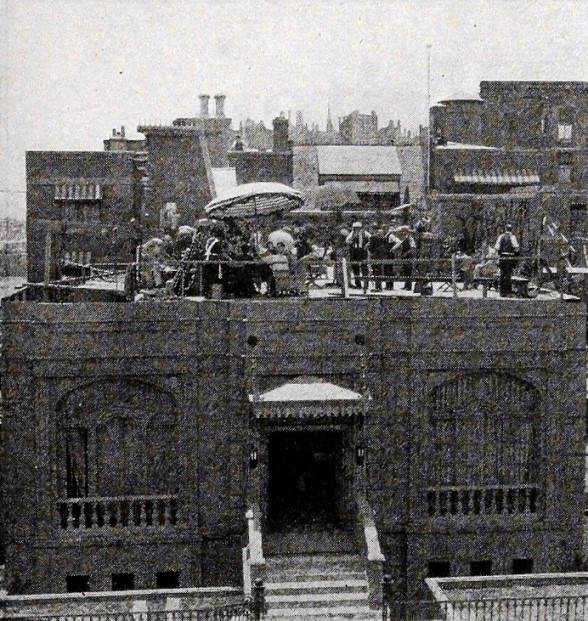
- Film set with a synthetic New York City skyline in the background
- Directed by: Scott Sidney
- Written by: Frank Roland Conklin
- Based on: "Seven Days" by Mary Roberts Rinehart
- Produced by: Al Christie
- Starring: Lillian Rich; Creighton Hale; Lilyan Tashman
- Cinematography: Alex Phillips; Gilbert Warrenton
- Production company: Christie Film Company
- Distributed by: Producers Distributing Corporation; Gaumont British Distributors (UK)
- Release date: August 31, 1925
- Running time: 70 minutes
- Country: United States
- Language: Silent (English intertitles)

Seven Days is a 1925 American silent comedy film directed by Scott Sidney and starring Lillian Rich, Creighton Hale, and Lilyan Tashman. It is an adaptation of the 1909 play Seven Days, which was based upon a story by Mary Roberts Rinehart.

== Plot ==
As described in a film magazine reviews, Jim Wilson’s guests arrive to celebrate with him his first anniversary of his divorce. Bella Wilson, his former wife, is present. Jim is infatuated with Kit Eclair. The butler is stricken with a malady. Fearing its contagion, the servants flee. Aunt Selina, Jim’s moneyed relative, arrives. Jim persuades Kit to pose as his wife because he does not wish Aunt Selina to know that he is divorced. Police announce that the house is quarantined. At bedtime, Aunt Selina supervises sleeping arrangements, putting everybody in the wrong rooms. Jim carries on a flirtation with Bella. Kit is wooed by Tom Harbison, her former lover. Jim re-wins his former wife and explains the humorous situation to Aunt Selina.

== Cast ==
- Lillian Rich as Kit Eclair
- Creighton Hale as Jim Wilson
- Lilyan Tashman as Bella Wilson
- Mabel Julienne Scott as Anne Brown
- William Austin as Dal Brown
- Hallam Cooley as Tom Harbison
- Rosa Gore as Aunt Selina
- Tom Wilson as Policeman
- Eddie Gribbon as Burglar
- Charles Clary as Seer

== Bibliography ==
- Munden, Kenneth White. The American Film Institute Catalog of Motion Pictures Produced in the United States, Part 1. University of California Press, 1997.
