= The Million Dollar Handicap =

1925 film

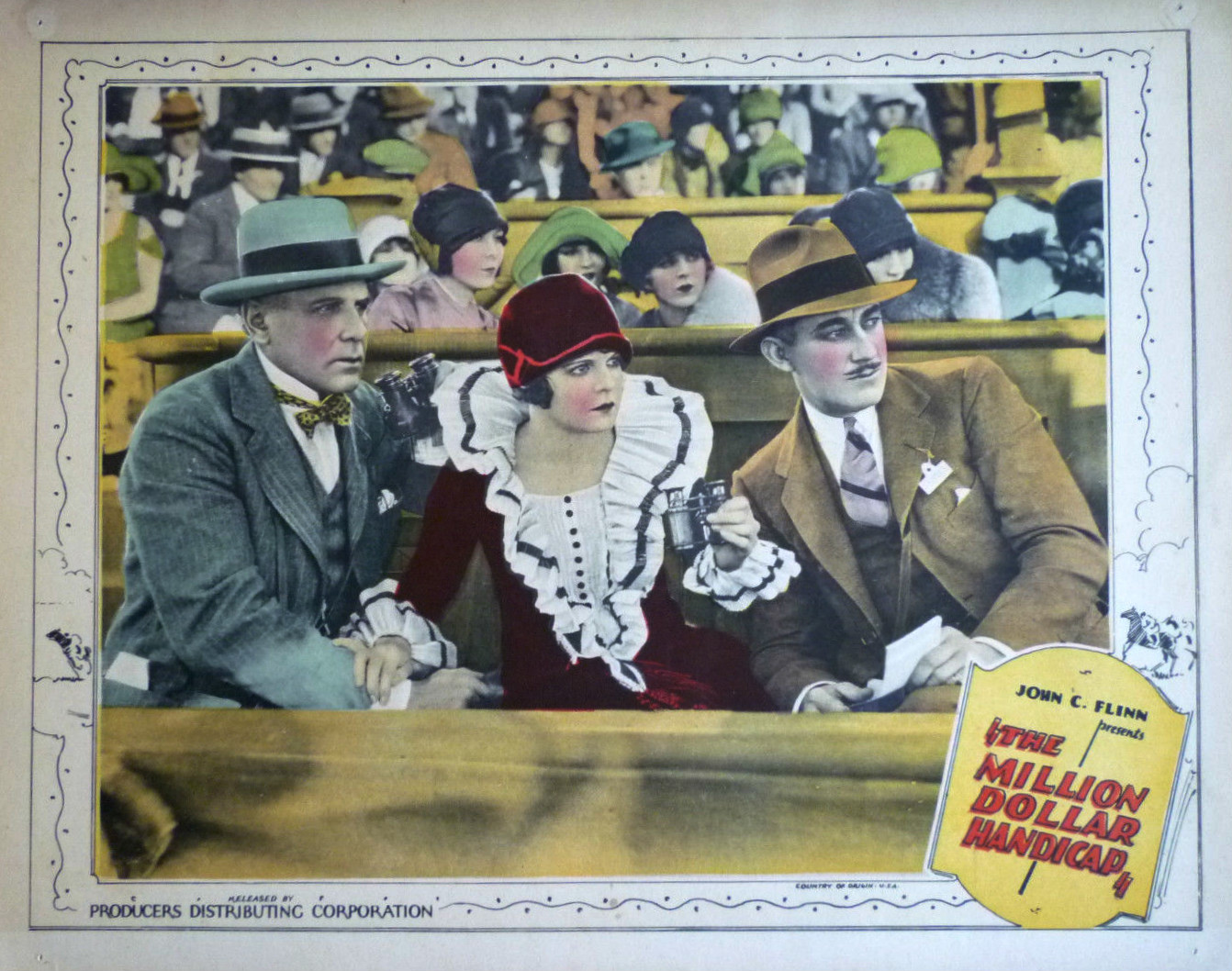
- Lobby card
- Directed by: Scott Sidney
- Written by: F. McGrew Willis
- Based on: Thoroughbreds by William Alexander Fraser
- Produced by: George C. Bertholon; John C. Flinn
- Starring: Edmund Burns; Ralph Lewis; Ward Crane
- Cinematography: ［Devereaux Jennings
- Production company: Metropolitan Pictures Corporation of California
- Distributed by: Producers Distributing Corporation; FBO Pictures (UK)
- Release date: February 7, 1925
- Running time: 60 minutes
- Country: United States
- Language: Silent (English intertitles)

The Million Dollar Handicap is a 1925 American silent sports drama film directed by Scott Sidney and starring Edmund Burns, Ralph Lewis, and Ward Crane. It is based on the 1902 novel Thoroughbreds by William Alexander Fraser. The film was released in Britain the following year under the alternative title The Pride of the Paddock.

== Plot ==
As described in a film magazine review, John Porter, a Southern horse breeder, is tricked into buying a doped filly named Dixie. His daughter Alis discovers that the horse can actually run. Her sweetheart George Mortimer, a cashier at the bank, shields her brother Alan after the latter embezzles some funds, and George is discharged. Alis' father suffers a paralytic stroke and is in financial difficulties. Alis disguises herself as a jockey and rides her despised horse in a $10,000 handicap race and wins. The excitement of the victory cures the father, her unjustly accused sweetheart George is cleared of any charges, and the two are happy together.

== Cast ==
- Edmund Burns as George Mortimer
- Ralph Lewis as John Porter
- Ward Crane as Phillip Crane
- Tom Wilson as Tom
- Clarence Burton as Langdon
- Danny Hoy as Jockey
- Rosa Gore as Marilda Porter
- Ralph Emerson as Alan Porter
- Lon Poff as Milkman
- Vera Reynolds as Alis Porter

== Bibliography ==
- Connelly, Robert B. The Silents: Silent Feature Films, 1910-36, Volume 40, Issue 2. December Press, 1998.
- Munden, Kenneth White. The American Film Institute Catalog of Motion Pictures Produced in the United States, Part 1. University of California Press, 1997.
