= The Golden Bed =

1925 film

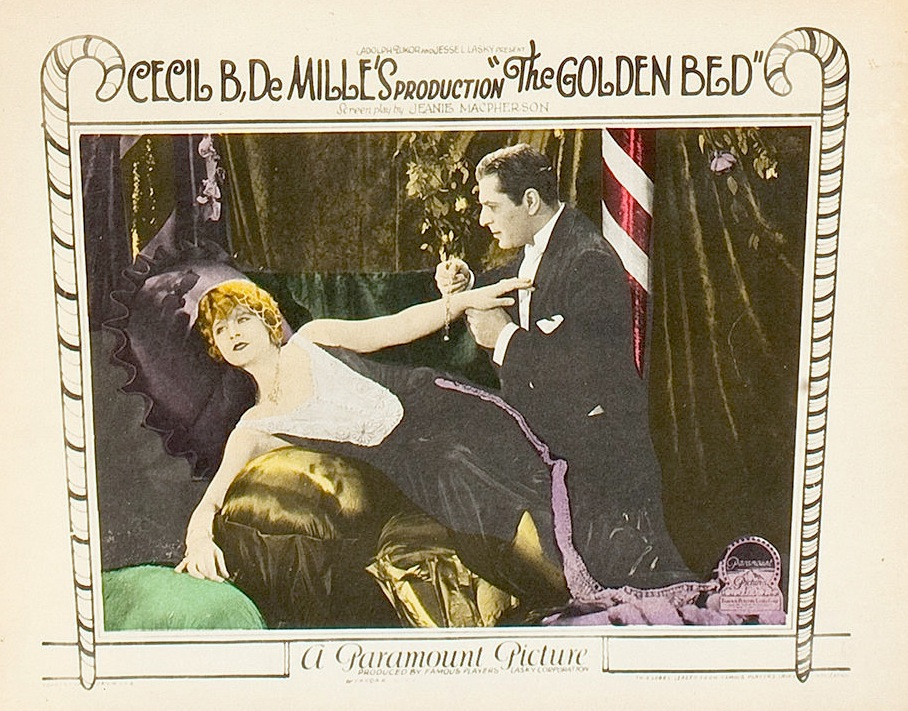
- Lobby card for the film
- Directed by: Cecil B. DeMille
- Written by: Jeanie MacPherson
- Based on: Tomorrow's Bread by Wallace Irwin
- Produced by: Adolph Zukor; Jesse L. Lasky
- Starring: Lillian Rich; Vera Reynolds
- Cinematography: J. Peverell Marley
- Edited by: Anne Bauchens
- Production company: Famous Players-Lasky
- Distributed by: Paramount Pictures
- Release date: January 25, 1925
- Running time: 90 minutes
- Country: United States
- Language: Silent (English intertitles)
- Budget: $437,900
- Box office: $816,487

The Golden Bed is a 1925 American silent drama film directed by Cecil B. DeMille. It is based on the 1924 short story Tomorrow's Bread by Wallace Irwin, originally published in Pictorial Review. Jeanie MacPherson wrote the screenplay.

== Plot ==
As described in a review in a film magazine, even as a child golden-haired Flora Lee Peake attracted the opposite sex. Little Admah Holtz, peddling candy, would give her some of his wares. She sleeps on a golden bed adorned with swans that her parents pampered her with. When she grew up, her father used his last dollar to bring about her marriage to the Marquis de San Pilar, while her younger sister Margaret went to work assisting Admah, who now owns a candy store. Soon after, the Marquis found Flora submitting to the embrace of the Duc. On a mountain climb the Marquis and Duc fight on a snow covered ledge atop a glacier, and the Marquis cuts the rope so that they both fall to their death in a crevasse.

Flora returns home and soon has ensnared Abmah, now a wealthy man. Her extravagance brings him near to ruin. To satisfy her, he throws a ball where all the decorations are made from candy, but he has used some of the firm's funds. Admah is arrested for this and is sent to prison for five years.

Margaret, who loves Admah, remains true and buys and operates the store, while Flora runs off with Bunny O'Neill. Bunny throws her down and, now a wreck, returns to her old home, now a boarding house, and goes to her room with its famous golden bed.

Admah, released from prison, also returns to the home and Flora dies in his arms. Going to his old store he finds Margaret waiting, and they start life anew.

== Cast ==
- Lillian Rich as Flora Lee Peake
- Henry B. Walthall as Colonel Peake
- Vera Reynolds as Margaret Peake
- Theodore Kosloff as Marquis de San Pilar
- Rod La Rocque as Admah Holtz
- Warner Baxter as Bunny O'Neill
- Robert Cain as Savarac, the Duc
- Robert Edeson as Amos Thompson
- Julia Faye as Mrs. Amos Thompson
- Charles Clary as Treasurer
- Julie Bishop as Child (credited as Jacqueline Wells)

== Preservation ==
Complete 35 mm and 16 mm prints of The Golden Bed are held by the George Eastman Museum in Rochester, New York.
