= Vera Reynolds =

American actress (1899–1962)

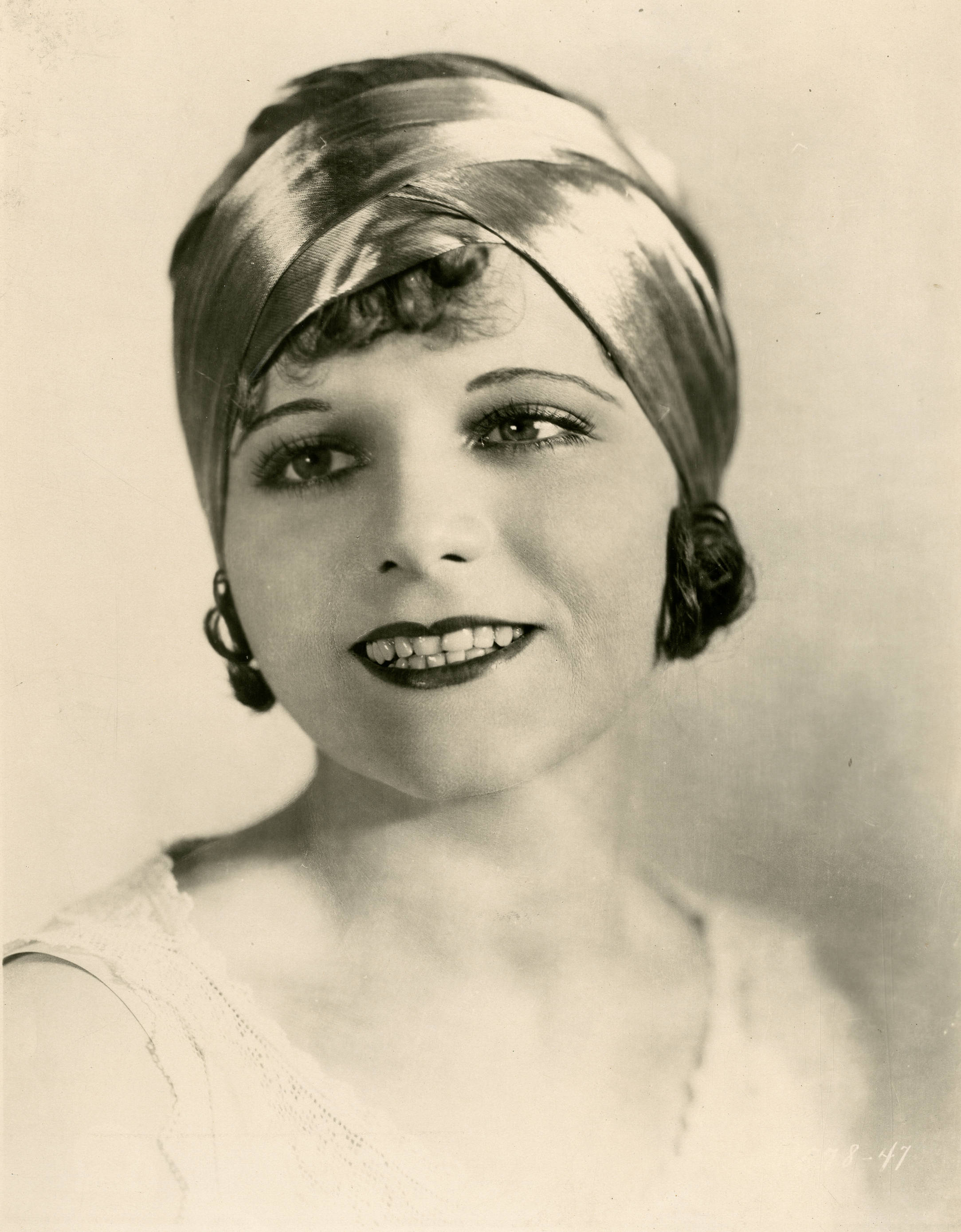
- Reynolds in 1925
- Born: Vera Nancy Reynolds; November 25, 1899; Richmond, Virginia, U.S.
- Died: April 22, 1962 (aged 62); Los Angeles, California, U.S.
- Burial place: Valhalla Memorial Park, North Hollywood
- Occupation: Actress
- Years active: 1917–1932
- Spouses: Earl Montgomery (m. 1919; div. 1926) Robert Ellis du Reel (m. 1926; div. 1938)

Vera Reynolds (born Vera Nancy Reynolds; November 25, 1899 – April 22, 1962) was an American film actress.

== Early life and career ==
Reynolds was born in Richmond, Virginia, in 1899. Her mother was Mrs. Lillie Reynolds. She first worked in films at age 12. She began as a dancer, worked as one of the Sennett Bathing Beauties, and became a leading lady in silent motion pictures. Among her film credits are starring roles in Sam Wood's Prodigal Daughters (1923), and Cecil B. DeMille's Feet of Clay (1924), The Golden Bed (1925), The Road to Yesterday (1925) and Dragnet Patrol (1931) with George "Gabby" Hayes.

== Controversy ==
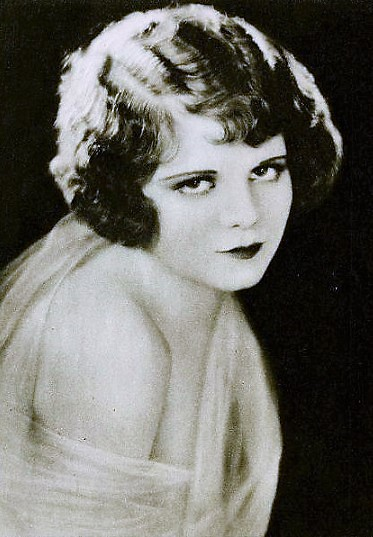
Vera Reynolds in the 1920s

On August 28, 1927, police in Hollywood reported that Reynolds had attempted suicide. An ambulance took her to a hospital, where doctors classified her condition as extremely critical. Reynolds, her mother, and her doctor said that food poisoning caused her illness and denied an attempt to end her life.

== Marriages ==
She married twice:

- To comedian Earl Montgomery; they divorced in 1926.
- To Robert Ellis du Reel (1892–1974). In March 1938, Reynolds reportedly brought a breach of promise suit against Reel. She sued Reel for $150,000, and contended she lived with Reel for nine years before she learned that they were not married. The suit claimed he promised to marry her, but failed to do so. During a recess in the trial Hollywood film director Robert G. Vignola, who believed the case could be reconciled out of court, assumed the role of peacemaker. Reynolds claimed to have had a marriage ceremony with Reel in Greenwich, Connecticut in 1926. Reel denied there had been a wedding, and stated the two had lived together unmarried. He remarked they "had the edge" on their unhappy married friends.

== Death ==
Reynolds died in Hollywood on April 22, 1962, aged 62, at the Motion Picture Country Hospital in Woodland Hills, California. She was buried in Valhalla Memorial Park, North Hollywood.

== Filmography ==
- Luke's Trolley Troubles (1917, Short)
- That Dawgone Dog (1917, Short) as The Girl
- A Self-Made Hero (1917, Short)
- A Winning Loser (1917, Short)
- His Criminal Career (1917, Short)
- A Laundry Clean-Up (1917, Short)
- A Janitor's Vengeance (1917, Short)
- His Sudden Rival (1917, Short)
- His Hidden Talent (1917, Short) as The Fellow's Sweetheart
- Caught in the End (1917, Short) as The Jealous Husband's Wife
- A Prairie Heiress (1917, Short)
- It Pays to Exercise (1918, Short) as Gym Girl (uncredited)
- A Saphead's Sacrifice (1920, Short)
- Twin Bedlam (1920, Short)
- Dry and Thirsty (1920, Short) as Mrs. Tryan
- Parked in the Park (1920, Short)
- Rough on Rubes (1920, Short)
- Kissed in a Harem (1920, Short)
- Beaned on the Border (1920, Short)
- Stay Down East (1921, Short)
- Should Brides Marry? (1921, Short)
- Home Blues (1921, Short)
- His Hansom Butler (1921, Short)
- Designing Husbands (192, Short)
- Cleo's Easy Mark (1921, Short)
- All at Sea (1921, Short)
- Tomale-O (1922, Short)
- Sweet Cookie (1922, Short)
- Koo Koo Kids (1922, Short)
- What Next? (1922, Short)
- Whose Husband Are You? (1922, Short)
- Rented Trouble (1922, Short)
- But a Butler! (1922, Short)
- Easy Pickin' (1922, Short)
- The Pest (1922, Short) as The poor tenant
- Prodigal Daughters (1923) as Marjory Forbes
- Woman-Proof (1923) as Celeste Rockwood
- Chop Suey Louie (1923, Short)
- Shadows of Paris (1924) as Liane
- Flapper Wives (1924) as Sadie Callahan
- Icebound (1924) as Nettie Moore
- For Sale (1924) as Betty Twombly-Smith
- Broken Barriers (1924) as Sadie Denton
- Feet of Clay (1924) as Amy Loring
- Cheap Kisses (1924) as Kitty Dillingham
- The Night Club (1925) as Grace Henderson
- The Golden Bed (1925) as Margaret Peake
- The Million Dollar Handicap (1925)
- The Limited Mail (1925) as Caroline Dale
- Without Mercy (1925) as Margaret Garth
- The Road to Yesterday (1925) as Beth Tyrell
- Steel Preferred (1925) as Amy Creeth
- Silence (1926) as Norma Drake / Norma Powers
- Sunny Side Up (1926) as Sunny Ducrow
- Risky Business (1926) as Cecily Stoughton
- Corporal Kate (1926) as Kate O'Reilly
- The Little Adventuress (1927) as Helen Davis
- Wedding Bill$ (1927)
- The Main Event (1927) as Glory Frayne
- Almost Human (1927) as Mary Kelly
- Golf Widows (1928) as Alice Anderson
- The Divine Sinner (1928) as Lillia Ludwig
- Jazzland (1928) as Stella Baggott
- Back from Shanghai (1929)
- Tonight at Twelve (1929) as Barbara Warren
- The Last Dance (1930) as Sally Kelly
- The Lone Rider (1930) as Mary Stevens
- Borrowed Wives (1930) as Alice Blake
- The Lawless Woman (1931) as June Page
- Hell-Bent for Frisco (1931) as Ellen Garwood
- Neck and Neck (1931) as Norma Rickson
- Dragnet Patrol (1931) as Millie White
- The Monster Walks (1932) as Ruth Earlton
- Gorilla Ship (1932) as Helen Wells
- Tangled Destinies (1932) as Ruth, the Airline Stewardess (final film role)
