= Golf Widows =

1928 film

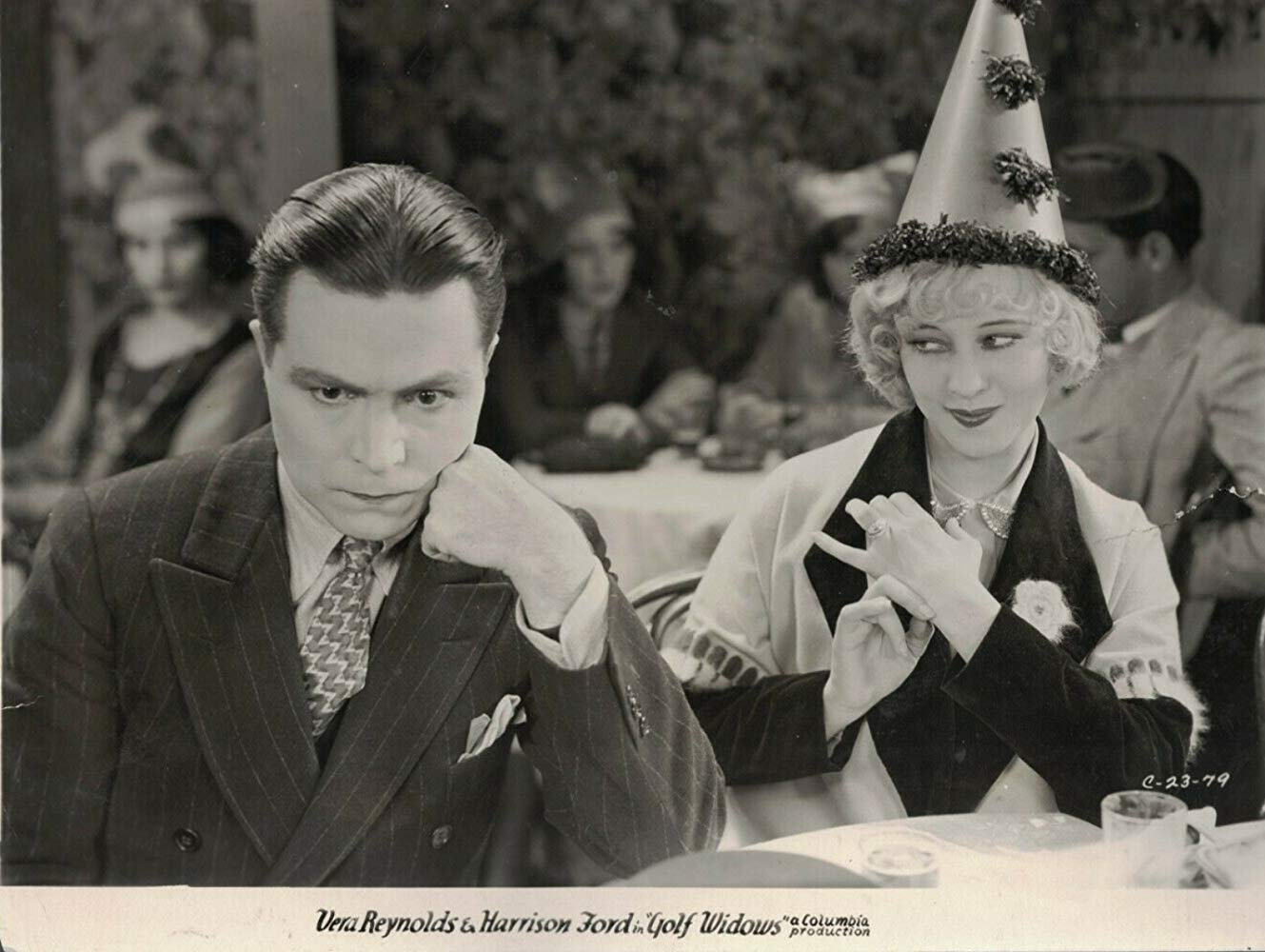
- Directed by: Erle C. Kenton
- Written by: Scott Darling
- Produced by: Harry Cohn
- Starring: Vera Reynolds; Harrison Ford; Sally Rand
- Cinematography: Arthur L. Todd
- Production company: Columbia Pictures
- Distributed by: Columbia Pictures
- Release date: May 1, 1928
- Running time: 56 minutes
- Country: United States
- Languages: Silent; English intertitles

Golf Widows is a 1928 American silent comedy film directed by Erle C. Kenton and starring Vera Reynolds, Harrison Ford and Sally Rand.

== Cast ==
- Vera Reynolds as Alice Anderson
- Harrison Ford as Charles Bateman
- John Patrick as Billy Gladstone
- Sally Rand as Mary Ward
- Kathleen Key as Ethel Dixon
- Vernon Dent as Ernest Ward
- Will Stanton as John Dixon

== Production ==
On March 9, 1927, Columbia Pictures announced in The Film Daily that Golf Widows was being put into production. Some contemporary trade publications list Henry Clayton Cooper as the story writer, but the copyright description only lists W. Scott Darling as author.

Vera Reynolds, Harrison Ford, and Sally Rand were all under contract with DeMille Pictures Corporation at the time, and were loaned to Columbia out for Golf Widows.

== Preservation and status ==
Complete copies of the film are held at the Cinematheque Royale de Belgique and the Library of Congress.

== Bibliography ==
- Munden, Kenneth White. The American Film Institute Catalog of Motion Pictures Produced in the United States, Part 1. University of California Press, 1997.
