= Neck and Neck (film) =

1931 film directed by Richard Thorpe

- Directed by: Richard Thorpe
- Written by: Betty Burbridge
- Produced by: George W. Weeks; Roy Davidge
- Starring: Glenn Tryon; Vera Reynolds; Walter Brennan
- Cinematography: Jules Cronjager
- Edited by: Viola Roehl
- Production company: Sono Art-World Wide Pictures
- Distributed by: Sono Art-World Wide Pictures
- Release date: 4 November 1931
- Running time: 63 minutes
- Country: United States
- Language: English

Neck and Neck is a 1931 American pre-Code drama film directed by Richard Thorpe from a script by Betty Burbridge and starring Glenn Tryon, Vera Reynolds and Walter Brennan.

== Cast ==
- Glenn Tryon as Bill Grant
- Vera Reynolds as Norma Rickson
- Walter Brennan as Hector
- Lafe McKee as Colonel Rickson
- Carroll Nye as Frank Douglas
- Stepin Fetchit as The hustler
- Lloyd Whitlock as Bookie
- Fern Emmett as Aunt Susan
- Rosita Butler as Crystal

== Bibliography ==
- Pitts, Michael R. Poverty Row Studios, 1929-1940. McFarland & Company, 2005.
