= Wilson Benge =

English actor (1875–1955)

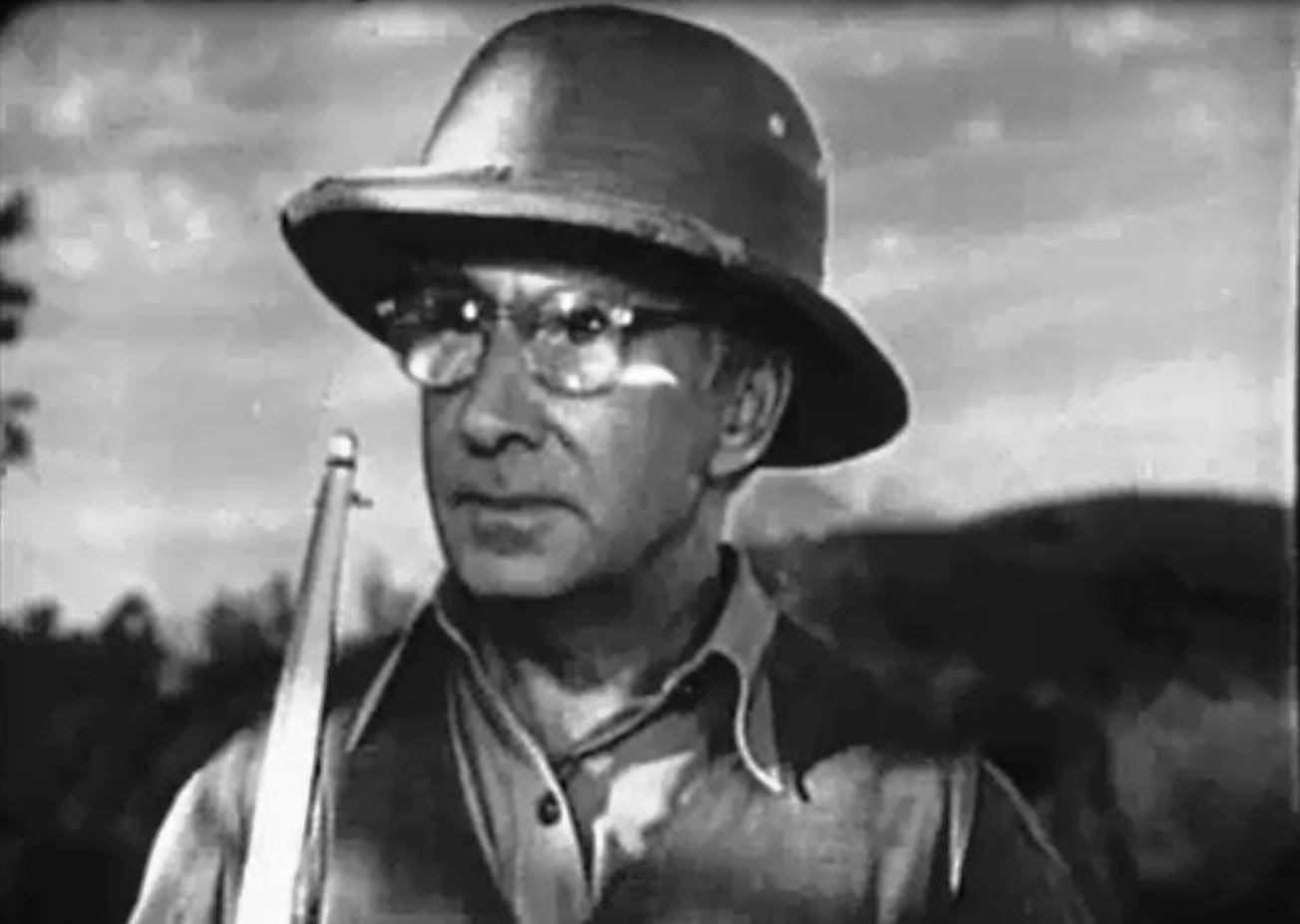
- Benge in Queen of the Amazons (1947)
- Born: George Frederick Benge; 1 March 1875; Greenwich, London, England
- Died: 1 July 1955 (aged 80); Hollywood, California, U.S.
- Years active: 1922–1955
- Spouse: Sarah L. Benge (1882–1954)

George Frederick "Wilson" Benge (1 March 1875 – 1 July 1955) was an English actor who mostly featured in American films from the silent days. He appeared in over 200 films between 1922 and 1955.

Along with actors Charles Coleman and Robert Greig, Benge was heavily typecast as butler or valet and was one of Hollywood's most familiar manservants in the 1930s and 1940s. He also appeared in several Laurel and Hardy comedies. He worked in films until his death.

== Selected filmography ==
- Robin Hood (1922)
- Alias Mary Flynn (1925)
- Without Mercy (1925)
- The Road to Yesterday (1925)
- A Trip to Chinatown (1926)
- The Clinging Vine (1926)
- The Midnight Message (1926)
- Fast and Furious (1927)
- Do Detectives Think? (1927)
- The Lone Eagle (1927)
- The Battle of the Century (1927)
- Alias the Deacon (1928)
- That's My Daddy (1928)
- You're Darn Tootin' (1928)
- A Gentleman Preferred (1928)
- The Rush Hour (1928)
- Bulldog Drummond (1929)
- Raffles (1930)
- The She-Wolf (1931)
- Consolation Marriage (1931)
- Heartbreak (1931)
- Men in Her Life (1931)
- Scram! (1932)
- Unholy Love (1932)
- Twin Husbands (1933)
- The Ghost Walks (1934)
- Dodsworth (1936)
- What Becomes of the Children? (1936)
- Camille (1936) as Attendant (uncredited)
- Rulers of the Sea (1939)
- A Plumbing We Will Go (1940)
- The Spider Woman (1944)
- The Pearl of Death (1944)
- House of Fear (1945)
- Pursuit to Algiers (1945)
- Dressed To Kill (1946)
- The Three Musketeers (1948)
- The Scarlet Coat (1955)
