= Steel Preferred =

1925 film

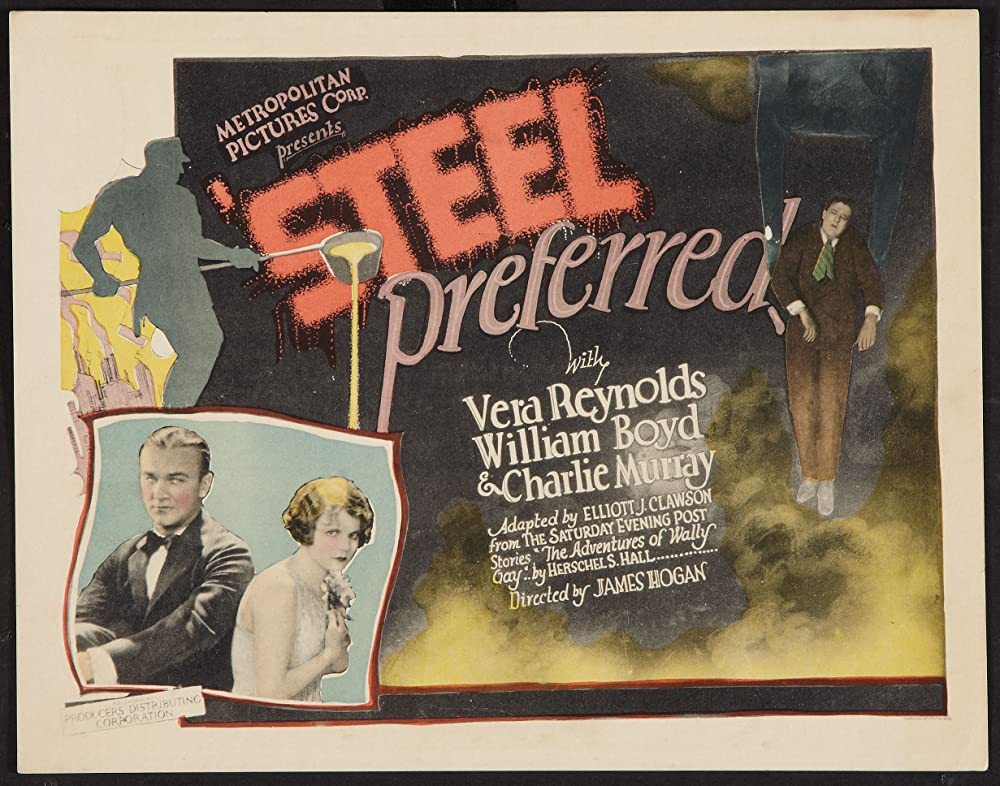
- Lobby card
- Directed by: James P. Hogan
- Written by: Elliott J. Clawson
- Based on: Steel Preferred by Herschel S. Hall
- Starring: Vera Reynolds; William Boyd; Hobart Bosworth
- Cinematography: Devereaux Jennings
- Production company: Metropolitan Pictures Corporation of California
- Distributed by: Producers Distributing Corporation
- Release date: December 21, 1925
- Running time: 70 minutes
- Country: United States
- Languages: Silent; English intertitles

Steel Preferred is a 1925 American silent drama film directed by James P. Hogan and starring Vera Reynolds, William Boyd, and Hobart Bosworth. The film portrays a power struggle at a steelworks.

== Plot ==
As described in a film magazine review, Wally Gay, a young furnace man’s helper in a steel mill, is eager to become a mill owner, and to that end tries to submit to the mill owner for whom he works a new plan for installing a battery of furnaces. He is spurred on by his love for Amy Creeth, the mill owner’s daughter. His enemy in his plan for the mill is the nephew of the acting superintendent of the mill, who also seeks to win the affection of the young woman. Many complications arise out of the plans for the new furnaces, including a spill of molten metal near Amy and a strike by the mill workers, but the young tender’s helper finally has his plan for the mill adopted and also wins the love of the young woman.

== Cast ==
- Vera Reynolds as Amy Creeth
- William Boyd as Wally Gay
- Hobart Bosworth as James Creeth
- Charles Murray as Dicker
- Walter Long as Redface
- William V. Mong as Nicker
- Nigel Barrie as Waldron
- Helene Sullivan as Mrs. Creeth
- Ben Turpin as Bartender

== Preservation ==
With no prints of Steel Preferred located in any film archives, it is a lost film.

== Bibliography ==
- Munden, Kenneth White. The American Film Institute Catalog of Motion Pictures Produced in the United States, Part 1. University of California Press, 1997.
