= Made for Love (film) =

1926 American silent drama film

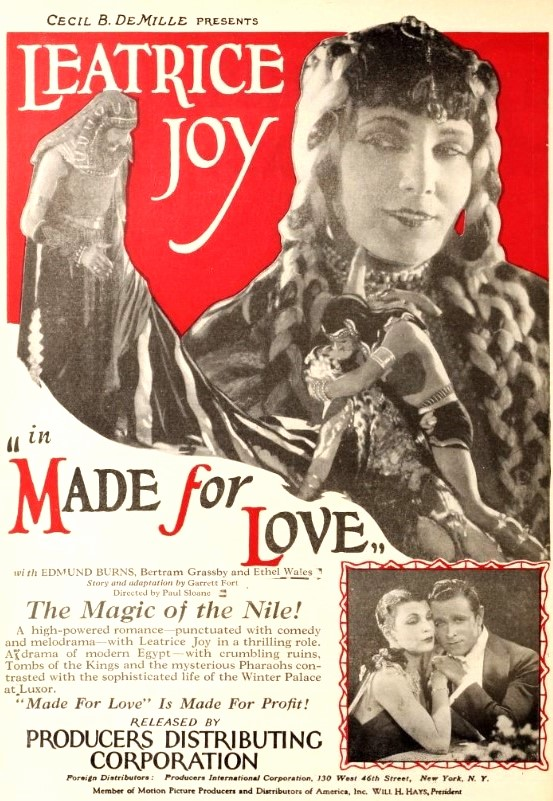
- Trade advertisement
- Directed by: Paul Sloane
- Written by: Garrett Fort (story, scenario)
- Produced by: Cinema Corporation of America (Cecil B. DeMille)
- Starring: Leatrice Joy; Edmund Burns
- Cinematography: Arthur C. Miller
- Distributed by: Producers Distributing Corporation
- Release date: February 14, 1926
- Running time: 65 minutes; 7 reels
- Country: United States
- Language: Silent (English intertitles)

Made for Love is a 1926 American silent drama film directed by Paul Sloane, produced by Cecil B. DeMille, and starring Leatrice Joy.

== Plot ==
Made for Love (1926)

As described in a film magazine review, Nicholas Ainsworth is a young American archaeologist working in Egypt who neglects his wife Joan for his work, in which he is assisted by Lady Diana Trent, a titled Englishwoman. His wife resents her husband’s attitude and, after a number of adventures, accepts the attentions of a native prince. For revenge of what he considers to be an affront to his family, the prince plots to dynamite a tomb while the scientist is working in it. The neglected wife rides to warn her husband of the danger. Both are trapped by the explosion. The prince is killed by a falling rock, and the scientist and his wife are finally rescued and reconciled.

== Cast ==
- Leatrice Joy as Joan Ainsworth / Herath
- Edmund Burns as Nicholas Ainsworth / Aziru
- Ethel Wales as Lady Diana Trent
- Bertram Grassby as Mahmoud Bey
- Brandon Hurst as Pharaoh
- Frank Butler as Freddie Waddams
- Lincoln Stedman as The Cherub
- Neely Edwards as Pierre the pet of the Boulevards
- Snitz Edwards as Selim
- Malcolm Denny as Undetermined Secondary Role (uncredited)

== Production ==
In the first reel, the introduction of Joan (Leatrice Joy) is accompanied by a closeup with her new hair style. Joy had impulsively cut her hair short in 1926, and DeMille, whom Joy had followed when he set up Producers Distributing Corporation, was publicly angry as it prevented her from portraying traditional feminine roles. The studio developed projects with roles suitable for her “Leatrice Joy bob”, and Made for Love was the first of five films before she regrew her hair. Despite this, a professional dispute would end the Joy / Demille partnership in 1928.

== Preservation ==
A copy of Made for Love is preserved film at the UCLA Film and Television Archive.
