= Gigolo (1926 film) =

1926 film

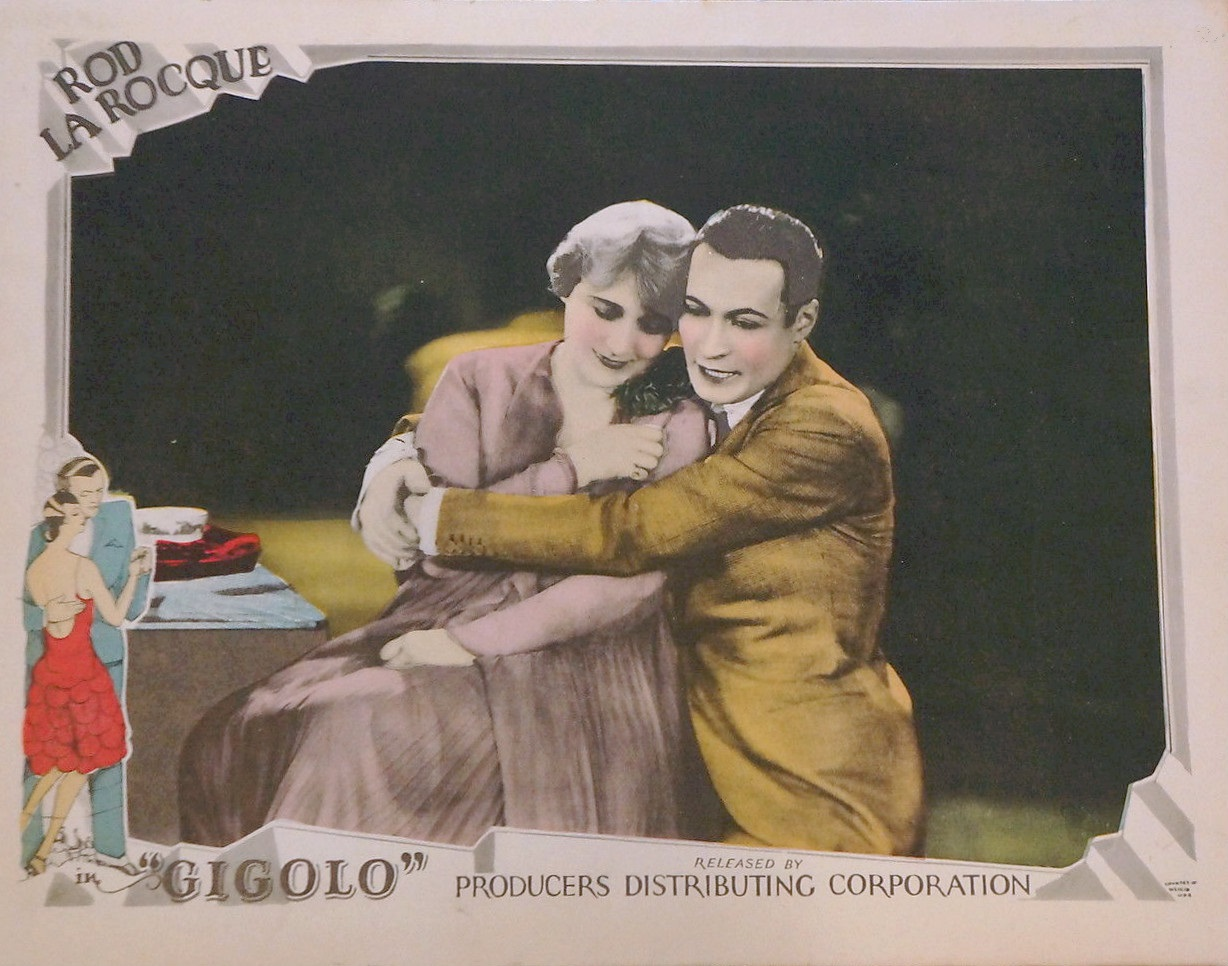
- Lobby card
- Directed by: William K. Howard
- Written by: Garrett Fort (adaptation); Marion Orth (scenario); John Krafft (intertitles)
- Based on: Gigolo by Edna Ferber
- Produced by: Cecil B. DeMille
- Starring: Rod La Rocque; Jobyna Ralston
- Cinematography: Lucien Andriot
- Distributed by: Producers Distributing Corporation
- Release date: October 4, 1926 (U.S.)
- Running time: 80 minutes; 8 reels (7,295 feet)
- Country: United States
- Language: Silent (English intertitles)

Gigolo is a 1926 American silent romantic drama film produced by Cecil B. DeMille and released by Producers Distributing Corporation. William K. Howard directed and Rod La Rocque and Jobyna Ralston star. The film is based on a novel, Gigolo, by Edna Ferber.

Prints survive of this silent feature.

== Cast ==
- Rod La Rocque as Gideon Gory
- Jobyna Ralston as Mary Hubbel
- Louise Dresser as Julia Gory
- Cyril Chadwick as Doctor Gerald Blagden
- George Nichols as Pa Hubbel
- Ina Anson as Dancer
- Sally Rand as Tourist Girl in Paris
- Eddie Borden as Gideon's Soldier Buddy (uncredited)
- André Cheron as Headwaiter (uncredited)
- Gino Corrado as Hotel Crillon Desk Clerk (uncredited)
- Alphonse Martell as Waiter at Maxim's (uncredited)
- Edward Peil Sr. as Paris Cafe Patron (uncredited)
- Julian Rivero as Second Waiter (uncredited)
- Philip Sleeman as Gigolo (uncredited)
