= Charles Clary =

American actor (1873-1931)

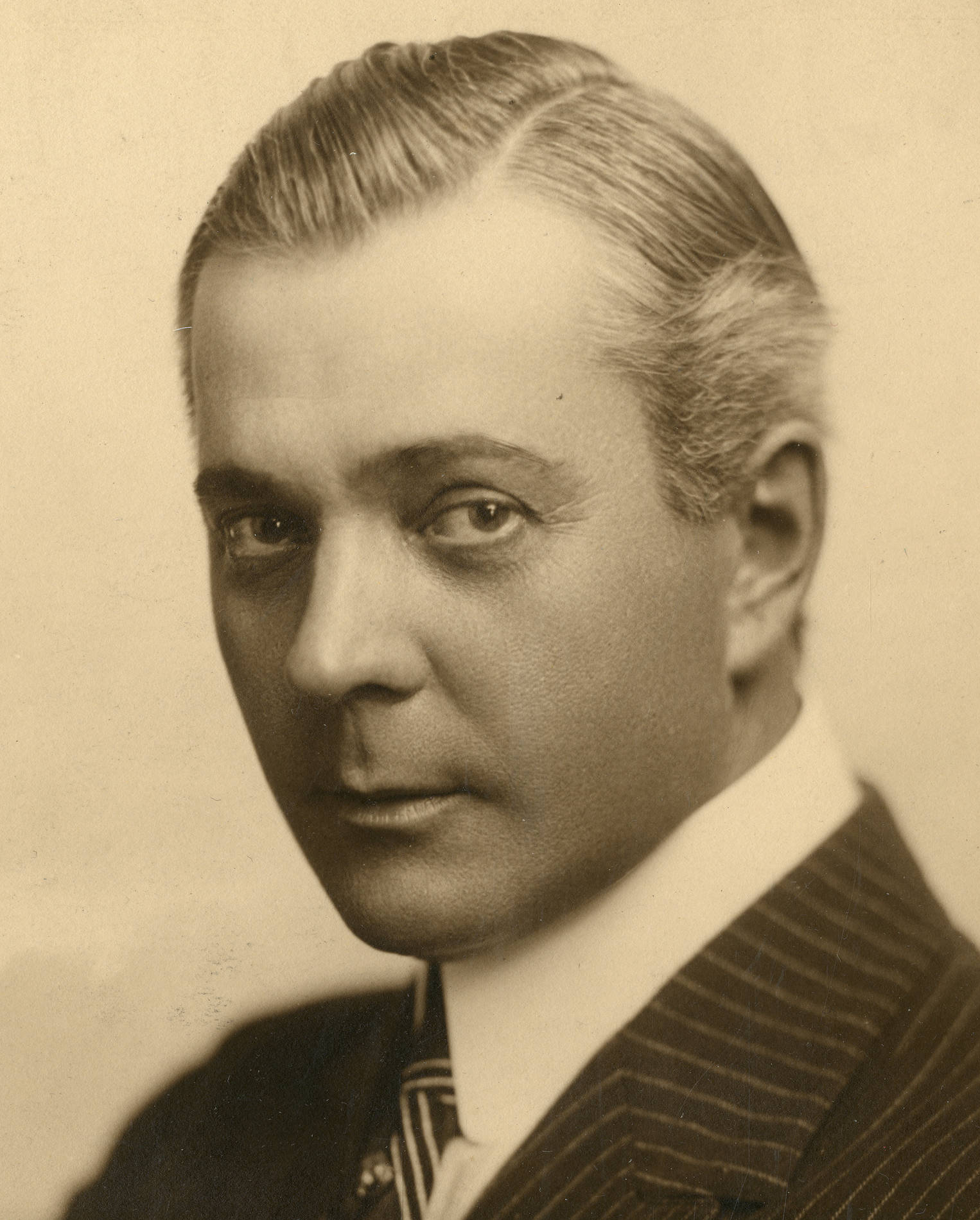
- Clary in 1914
- Born: March 24, 1873; Charleston, Illinois, United States
- Died: March 24, 1931 (aged 58); Los Angeles, California, United States
- Occupation: Actor
- Years active: 1910–1930

Charles Clary (March 24, 1873 – March 24, 1931) was an American actor of the silent film era. Clary appeared in more than 200 films between 1910 and 1930. He was born in Charleston, Illinois and died on his 58th birthday in Los Angeles, California. He worked for Selig and the Fine Arts Film Company. Before Clary joined Selig, he "played stock companies and road shows all over America".

== Selected filmography ==
- Brown of Harvard (1911)
- The Carpet from Bagdad (1915)
- At the Stroke of the Angelus (1915) (short)
- The Penitentes (1915)
- Joan the Woman (1917)
- The Innocent Sinner (1917)
- The Spy (1917)
- The Honor System (1917)
- A Tale of Two Cities (1917)
- Madame Du Barry (1917)
- The Silent Lie (1917)
- The Soul of Satan (1917)
- The Conqueror (1917)
- The Rose of Blood (1917)
- To Honor and Obey (1917)
- The Man Hunter (1919)
- The Lone Star Ranger (1919)
- A Girl Named Mary (1919)
- The Day She Paid (1919)
- The Woman in Room 13 (1920)
- A Light Woman (1920)
- The Penalty (1920)
- A Connecticut Yankee in King Arthur's Court (1921)
- The Sea Lion (1921)
- Sunset Jones (1921)
- The Hole in the Wall (1921)
- Opened Shutters (1921)
- Don't Neglect Your Wife (1921)
- Two Kinds of Women (1922)
- Heroes and Husbands (1922)
- Very Truly Yours (1922)
- Rich Men's Wives (1922)
- Cause for Divorce (1923)
- Money! Money! Money! (1923)
- The Last Hour (1923)
- Prodigal Daughters (1923)
- Six Days (1923)
- Thundering Dawn (1923)
- On Time (1924)
- The Whispered Name (1924)
- Behind the Curtain (1924)
- The Breath of Scandal (1924)
- In Fast Company (1924)
- Empty Hands (1924)
- The Golden Bed (1925)
- Speed Wild (1925)
- Jimmie's Millions (1925)
- Super Speed (1925)
- An Enemy Of Men (1925)
- Three Keys (1925)
- The Unwritten Law (1925)
- The Coast of Folly (1925)
- Seven Days (1925)
- The Road to Yesterday (1925)
- The Volga Boatman (1926)
- The Blind Goddess (1926)
- The Blue Streak (1926)
- Thrilling Youth (1926)
- Beverly of Graustark (1926)
- Mighty Like a Moose (1926 short)
- Satan Town (1926)
- His Foreign Wife (1927)
- Smile, Brother, Smile (1927)
- The Magic Garden (1927)
- See You in Jail (1927)
- Pretty Clothes (1927)
- The Big Hop (1928)
- A Woman Against the World (1928)
- Jazz Mad (1928)
- Sailor's Holiday (1929)
