= Earl Montgomery (director) =

US silent film director and actor

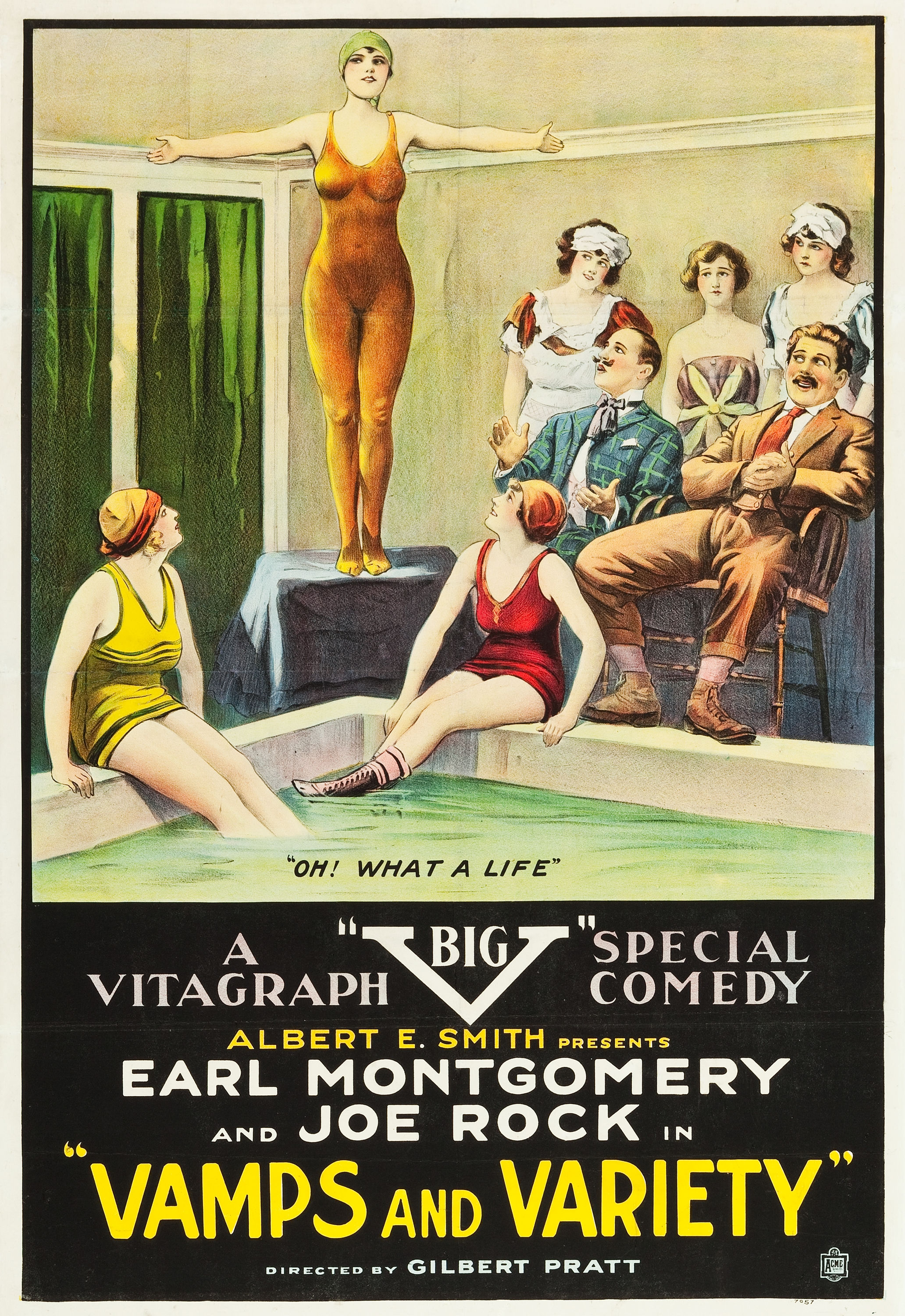
Poster for Vamps and Variety (1919)

Earl Triplett Montgomery (May 24, 1894 – October 28, 1966) was a film director, writer, and comedian who performed in silent films including as the character Hairbreadth Harry. He established the producing company Earl Montgomery Comedy Company. Joe Rock partnered with him at Vitagraph. He should not be confused with the actor Earl Montgomery (1921–1987).

Montgomery was born in Santa Cruz, California. He was a theater actor. Early in his film career he was a stunt man with American Film Company.

As a comedy team with Joe Rock at Vitagraph Studios he appeared in numerous shorts including Hash and Havoc (1916), Stowaways and Strategy (1917), Farms and Fumbles (1918), Harems and Hookum (1919), Zip and Zest (1919), Vamps and Variety (1919), Rubes and Robbers (1919), Cave and Coquettes (1919), Throbs and Thrills (1920), Loafers and Lovers (1920), and Sauce and Senoritas (1920). In the book Comedy is a Man in Trouble: Slapstick in American Movies by Alan Dale, Joe Rock described the two-reelers he made with Earl Montgomery saying, "We always finished our comedies with a shot of us running away from a cop, a schoolteacher, or a principal, and then running smack into them again. If we'd run away from cops, we'd run back into cops." Montgomery acted with the Vitagraph troupe known as Semon's Sea Lions.

He married Vera Reynolds but they divorced.

== Filmography ==
- Worries and Wobbles (1917)
- Sports and Splashes (1917)
- Plagues and Puppy Love (1917)
- Roughtoughs and Rooftops (1917)
- Flirts and Fakers (1918)
- Vamps and Variety (1918)
- Chumps and Cops (1918)
- Zip and Zest (1919)
- Fans and Flappers (1922)
- Over the Fence (1923)
- The Cloudhopper (1925)
- Stop, Look and Listen (1926)
