= Beulah Marie Dix =

American screenwriter

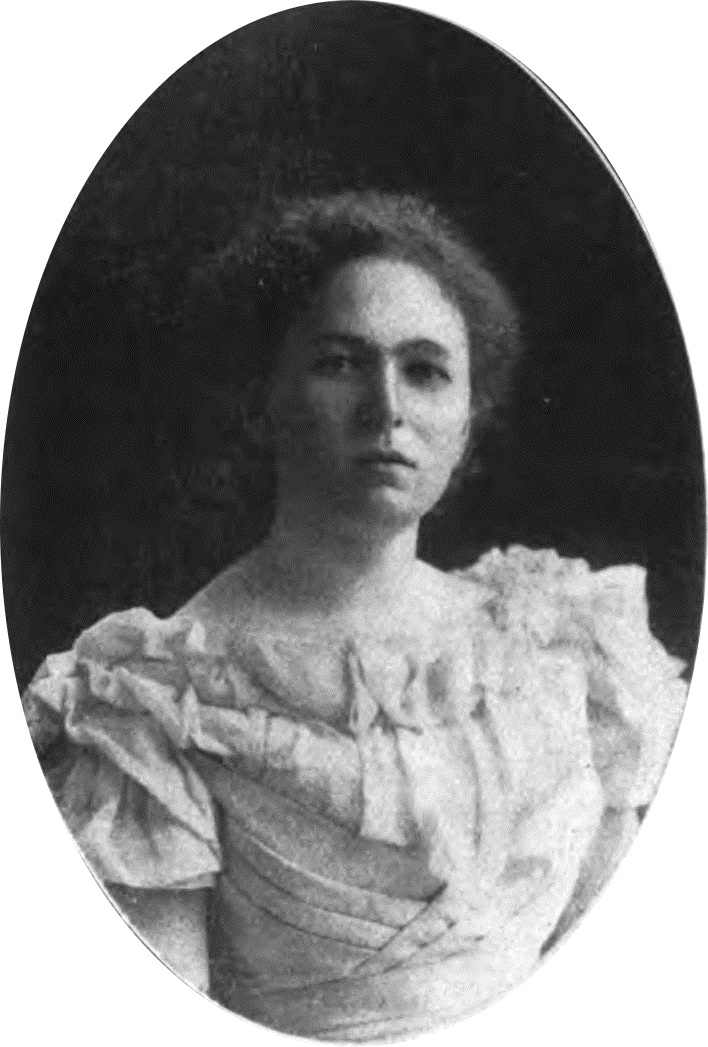
- Dix, prior to 1906
- Born: December 25, 1876; Kingston, Massachusetts, United States
- Died: September 25, 1970 (aged 93); Woodland Hills, Los Angeles, California, United States
- Other name: Beulah Marie Flebbe
- Education: Radcliffe College
- Occupation: Screenwriter
- Years active: 1917–1942
- Spouse: G. H. Flebbe (m. 1910)

Beulah Marie Dix (December 25, 1876 – September 25, 1970) was an American screenwriter of the silent and sound film eras, as well as a playwright and author of novels and children's books. She wrote for more than 55 films between 1917 and 1942. Dix married G. H. Flebbe at St. John's Chapel in Boston, Massachusetts on May 6, 1910.

== Early life ==
Beulah Marie Dix was born in Kingston, Massachusetts, and was the daughter of Henry and Maria Dix. Shortly after Dix was born her family moved to Plymouth, Massachusetts which ultimately became a reoccurring setting for many of Beulah's plays and novels. Not long after Dix's 16th birthday, her family moved to Chelsea, Massachusetts, where she graduated top of her high school class. Dix went on to study History and English at Radcliffe College in Cambridge, Massachusetts, graduating with Summa Cum Laude. Dix used these two subjects as her main focal point when writing plays and essays, such as: Thirty Years' War, The Boston Tea Party, and Seventeenth-Century England. Beulah's was also recognized as the first female recipient of the Sohier Literary Prize, which is an award given to either a Harvard or Radcliffe student who composes the best thesis.

== Career ==
Although Dix relied heavily on historically famous military events when it came to composing her children's books, plays, and novels, she was in real life a pacifist. Eventually, as her career progressed as a novelist, she strayed from historical romances and began to write anti-war novels. Dix took a stand against violence and with America on the brink of World War I, she published two anti-war plays, Across the Border and Moloch. Dix took full advantage of these plays by placing the main characters into a moral conundrum that questioned whether or not "they did anything to stop it".

Growing up Dix never found the need to seek any sort of feminine companionship. As a self-proclaimed tomboy, Dix admitted that most of her main characters were little boys because "they are more exciting than little girls". Nevertheless, she did take time to thank two very influential women in her life. Evelyn Greenleaf Sutherland was a well-established female figure in the Boston society. Together they collaborated on plays such as The Breed of the Treshams, The Substitute and The Road to Yesterday. These plays were created using the male pseudonym (John Rutherford) in order to remain appealing to audiences during this time. The other woman in Dix's life was her agent, Beatrice de Mille. De Mille was the mother of famous film directors, William de Mille and Cecil B. de Mille, which is how Dix found her way to Hollywood. In 1916 on a trip to California to visit de Mille, Dix decided to stay. With the outbreak of polio and the start of World War I, Dix thought it would be in her best interest to stay on the west coast. Dix's professional experiences as a playwright allowed her to transition easily into screenwriting. She began her screenwriting career for the silver screen and respected screen director William de Mille.

In 1916 Dix began to write for the new motion picture industry as a part-time job. Her scripts became very well known and Dix became a respected and productive silent-era scenario writer. Her success as a screenwriter landed her a full-time job at Famous Players–Lasky, which soon evolved into Paramount Pictures. Dix's career skyrocketed and between 1917 and 1926 she is credited for more than fifty motion picture titles. Dix's success as a screenwriter was due to her work habits, which mostly consisted of working in solitude or in close partnership with a small group of friends. Typically her work would only be shared with William de Mille as well as her writing partner Bertram Millhauser. Dix had a strong sense of privacy towards her work that ultimately influenced her everyday life. When transitioning to the sound era Dix found it very difficult to find her way, which eventually led to her separation from Paramount Pictures in 1924. In 1925, shortly after she was denied a contract renewal, Dix found a home at the DeMille Studios.

Dix quickly became one of the most desirable screenwriters throughout Hollywood. Even during the Great Depression Dix was able to support her family due to her polished screenwriting skills. Dix's ability to create strong, historically accurate characters was very appealing to directors at this time, as was her love for writing violent scripts.

== Late career ==
Dix continued to experiment with other writing styles. In 1927 she published a children's book, The Turned About Girls, along with a risqué drama novel called Their Own Desire. Dix continued to write screenplays but found it more enjoyable to do so anonymously. Dix's anonymity when writing novels ultimately marked the end of her career. Beulah Marie Dix's passion and work ethic towards screenwriting was unparalleled during this time, which allowed her to leave her mark on the silent film era.

== Novels ==
- Soldier Rigdale: How He Sailed in the Mayflower and How He Served Miles Standish (1899)
- Hugh Gwyeth; A Roundhead Cavalier (1899)
- The Making of Christopher Ferringham (1901)
- The Beau's Comedy (1902)
- The Life, Treason and Death of James Blount of Breckenhow (1903)
- The Fair Maid of Graystones (1905)
- Merrylips (1906)
- A Little Captive Lad (1910)
- Betty-Bide-At-Home (1912)
- The Fighting Blade (1912)
- The Gate of Horn (1912)
- Mother's Son (1913)
- Maid Melicent (1914)
- The Little God Ebisu (1914)
- Across the Border (1915)
- The Battle Months of George Daurella (1916)
- Blithe McBride (1916)
- The Glorious Game (1916)
- Hands off! (1919)
- Turned-about Girls (1922)
- Pity of God (1932)
- Friends in the End (1931)
- Wedding Eve Murder (1941)

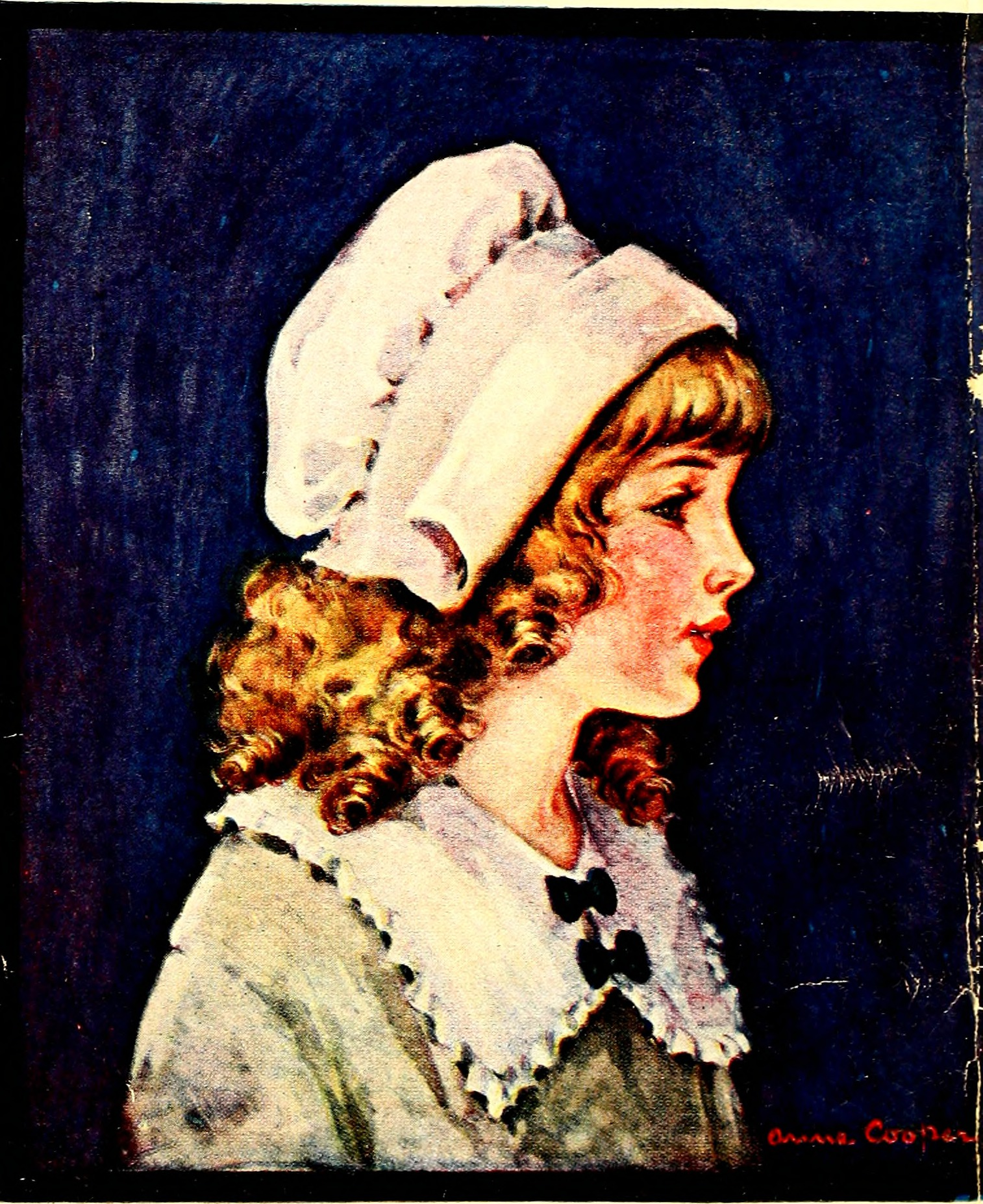
Merrylips, Novel (1906)

== Selected filmography ==
- The Sunset Trail (1917)
- The Squaw Man (1918)
- The Woman Thou Gavest Me (1919)
- Fool's Paradise (1921)
- The Fighting Blade (1923)
- The Spanish Dancer (1923)
- Feet of Clay (1924)
- The Road to Yesterday (1925)
- Silence (1926)
- Fighting Love (1927)
- Ned McCobb's Daughter (1928)
- The Leopard Lady (1928)
- The Godless Girl (1928)
- Black Magic (1929)
- Midnight Mystery (1930)
- Three Who Loved (1931)
- Ever in My Heart (1933)
- The Life of Jimmy Dolan (1933)
- They Made Me a Criminal (1939)
- Sweater Girl (1942)

== Awards ==
Dix won the 1897 George B. Sohier Prize for her thesis "Published Collections of English and Scottish Ballads, 1765–1802".
