= The Clinging Vine =

1926 film by Paul Sloane

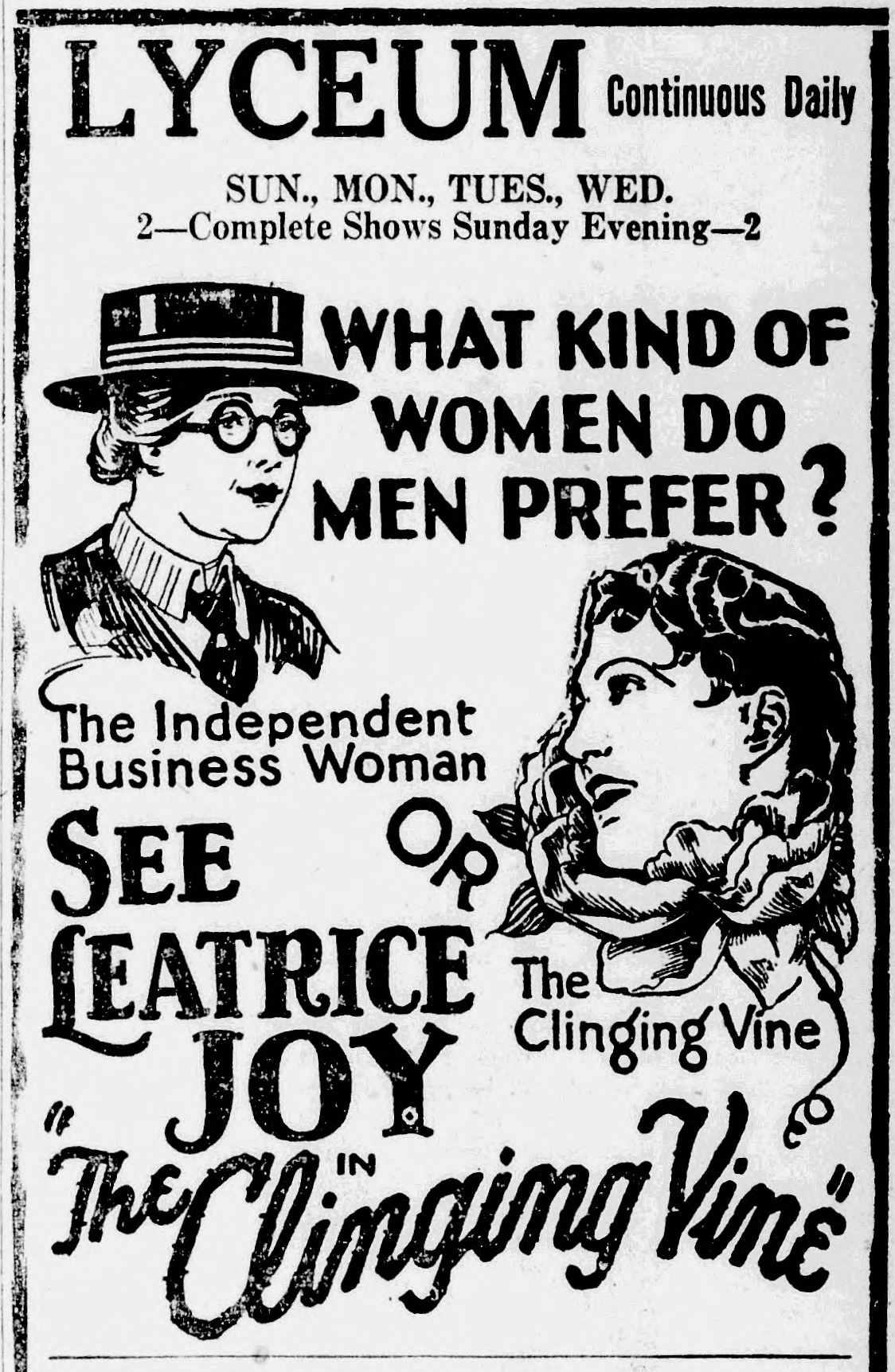
- Contemporary advertisement
- Directed by: Paul Slone
- Written by: Jack Levne (adaptation); Rex Taylor (adaptation); John W. Krafft (intertitles)
- Based on: The Clinging Vine by Zelda Sears
- Produced by: Cecil B. DeMille; Paul Sloane
- Starring: Leatrice Joy
- Cinematography: Arthur C. Miller
- Production company: DeMille Pictures Corporation
- Distributed by: Producers Distributing Corporation
- Release date: September 6, 1926
- Running time: 71 minutes; 7 reels (6,400 feet)
- Country: United States
- Language: Silent (English intertitles)

The film

The Clinging Vine is a 1926 American silent comedy film produced by Cecil B. DeMille and Paul Slone and directed by Sloane. It was distributed by DeMille's Producers Distributing Corporation. The film is based on a 1922 Broadway play of the same name by Zelda Sears. The film was a starring vehicle for Leatrice Joy who left Paramount Pictures along with DeMille when he formed his own distributing company PDC.

== Plot ==
Business woman Antoinette Allen (Joy), known only as "A.B.", works for T.M. Bancroft (Edeson) and runs the company for him and the male board of directors, and uses masculine manners, clothes, and hairstyle, but is unhappy. When at a business retreat she overhears the boss's son Jimmy (Moore) call her an Amazon, she allows Grandma Bancroft (Claude) to give her a makeover to be more feminine by wearing a young woman's attire, plucking her eyebrows, curl her hair, and bat her eyelashes. Grandma teaches A.B. that men do not want brains but a clinging vine, and explains that all she needs to say to any man is "Do go on!" and "Aren't you wonderful!" She is introduced to Grandma's guests in an exaggerated white outfit with ruffles and bows, and all the men are smitten with her, including Jimmy, whom she decides to marry. Despite her guise, A.B. saves the men and Jimmy from a con man, and saves the company from ruin. In time, A.B. is able to combine elements from her former business persona and the flirtatious feminine ideal that the men desire. In the end, Jimmy tells her, "I think you're wonderful", and A.B. replies "Oh, do go on!" just before they kiss.

== Cast ==
- Leatrice Joy as Antoinette 'A.B.' Allen
- Tom Moore as Jimmie Bancroft
- Robert Edeson as T.M. Bancroft
- Snitz Edwards as Dr. A. 'Tut' Tutweiler
- Toby Claude as Grandma Bancroft
- Dell Henderson as B. Harvey Doolittle

unbilled

- Wilson Benge as Grandma's Butler
- Isabelle Keith as House Guest
- Louis Natheaux as House Guest
- John Roche as House Guest

== Production ==
Leatrice Joy had impulsively cut her hair short in 1926, and Cecil B. DeMille, whom Joy had followed when he set up PDC, was publicly angry as it prevented her from portraying traditional feminine roles. The studio developed projects with roles suitable for her "Leatrice Joy bob", and The Clinging Vine was the third of five films before she regrew her hair. Despite this, a professional dispute would end the Joy / Demille partnership in 1928.

Exteriors for The Clinging Vine were filmed at Mt. Lowe and Ocean Park.

== Reception ==
The reviews did not favor the film. While Motion Picture Magazine (Oct. 1926) thought the stage version of The Clinging Vine was a creditable success, they asked what would make PDC or Joy "go in for this brand of stuff." Picture Play Magazine (Oct. 1926) said Joy was not "fare well" and called the character's transformation in the film "sad", and Photoplay (Sep. 1926) called the plot "goofy" and the film "trite and tedious".

== Critical review ==
The film version presented A.B. (the only name she is called) as a much more androgynous character than the Antoinette of the stage play, and satirizes the conventions of the professional or business woman makeover film by absurdly exaggerating its comic changes. Furthermore, when A.B. is alone after her makeover, she returns to using masculine mannerisms. The introductory shot of Joy shows her from behind signing documents and directing employees, creating such a strong mannish impression (possible only in a silent film) that some have described the later feminine transformation as being like that of a female impersonator. Lastly, while much of the comedy comes with the difficulty in which A.B. transforms into the overly exaggerated feminine ideal, the greatest parody is how well it works on the men of the film.

== Preservation ==
A copy of The Clinging Vine is preserved at the Library of Congress and the UCLA Film and Television Archive, and it has been released on DVD.
