= Earl Montgomery (actor) =

Earl Montgomery (April 17, 1921 – March 4, 1987) was an American character actor of stage and screen. He should not be confused with the film director, writer and comedian Earl Montgomery (1894–1966).

== Life and career ==
A native of Memphis, Tennessee, Montgomery was educated at Harvard University where he graduated in 1943. He made his Broadway debut in 1947 at Maxine Elliott's Theatre as the Duke of Florence in Bertolt Brecht's Galileo. He had a prolific career on the New York stage through 1973. In 1959 he was a founding member of the Association of Producing Artists.

Some of Montgomery's other Broadway credits included Roger Doremus in Summer and Smoke (1948), Syringe & Bull in The Relapse (1950), Boyet in Love's Labour's Lost (1953), Salarino in The Merchant of Venice (1953), Rochus Lieberman, S.J. in The Strong Are Lonely (1953), Police Inspector Mourel in The Heavenly Twins (1955), Chaplain de Stogumber in Saint Joan (1956), Oudatte in Look After Lulu! (1959), Gilbert Folliot in Becket (1960), Solomon and the Doctor in Everybody Loves Opal (1961), Pothinus in Her First Roman (1968), and Father Ambrose in The Waltz of the Toreadors (1973) among others.

Montgomery portrayed drama critic Alexander Woollcott in the 1963 film Act One. His other film roles included Russell Langley in F.I.S.T. (1978), a board member in Heaven Can Wait (1978), an employment manager in Rocky II (1979), the judge in Seed of Innocence (1980), the father in Superstition (1982), the conductor in Young Lust (1984), and Professor Collins in Stitches (1985).

Montgomery began his screen career on the soap opera Love of Life as Marty; a role he portrayed for two years in 1952-1953. He performed the part of Uriah Heep in a television adaptation of David Copperfield for the anthology series Robert Montgomery Presents in 1954. That same year he appeared in a televised version of The Apollo of Bellac on the Omnibus program, and performed in a televised version of Emlyn Williams's play Spring, 1600 on the anthology program Pond's Theater.

Television guest appearances by Montgomery included performances on Colonel Humphrey Flack (1954), The United States Steel Hour (1954), The Defenders (1963), The Happeners (1967), Mary Hartman, Mary Hartman (1977), Charlie's Angels (1977), What's Happening!! (1977), Forever Fernwood (1977), The Love Boat (1978), Carter Country (1978), The Ted Knight Show (1978), Eight Is Enough (1979), Kaz (1979), Hart to Hart (1980), Enos (1981), Dallas (1982), The Jeffersons (1982), The Dukes of Hazzard (1982), and Highway to Heaven (1985). He also performed roles in several television films; including Soldier in Love (1967, as Winston Churchill), Undercover with the KKK (1979, as Dr. Sheffield), Valentine Magic on Love Island (1980, as the Bishop), Thornwell (1981, as Peckham) and The Day the Bubble Burst (1982, as George Whitney).

He died of cancer at Cedars-Sinai Medical Center in Los Angeles, California on March 4, 1987.
