= Peverell Marley =

American cinematographer (1899–1964)

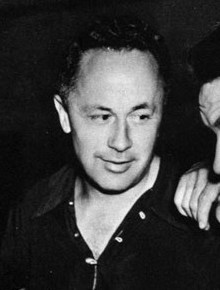
- Marley on the set of Winterset (1936)
- Born: John Peverell Marley; August 14, 1899; San Jose, California, U.S.
- Died: February 2, 1964 (aged 64); Santa Barbara, California, U.S.
- Resting place: Hollywood Forever Cemetery, Los Angeles, California
- Other names: Pev Marley; Peverell Marley; Peverly Marley; Peveerell Marley
- Occupation: Cinematographer
- Years active: 1923–1961
- Spouses: Lina Basquette (m. 1929; div. 1930) Virginia Ruth McAdoo (m. 1934; div. 1940) Linda Darnell (m. 1943; div. 1951)
- Children: 1

John Peverell Marley (August 14, 1899 – February 2, 1964) was an American cinematographer. He is one of only six cinematographers to have a star on the Hollywood Walk of Fame.

== Life and career ==
Born in San Jose, California, Marley began his career soon after graduating high school during the silent film era. His first film was the 1923 Cecil B. DeMille biblical epic The Ten Commandments. He later became DeMille's chief cameraman and would continue to work with DeMille throughout his career. He went on to work on 1929's The Godless Girl, starring his then-fiancée Lina Basquette. The couple divorced after just one year and Marley went on to marry dancer Virginia McAdoo and, later, actress Linda Darnell.

In the 1930s, Marley received an Academy Award nomination for Best Cinematography on the 1938 historical drama Suez. In 1948, he was nominated again for his work on the film Life with Father, starring Elizabeth Taylor and William Powell. After his divorce from Darnell in 1952, Marley continued to work on films including 1952's The Greatest Show on Earth for which he won a Golden Globe Award for Best Cinematography – Color. The following year, he filmed House of Wax, followed by King Richard and the Crusaders in 1954, Serenade in 1956, and The Spirit of St. Louis in 1957. In the late 1950s, he branched out to television working on the series Telephone Time and Bronco. Marley last worked on a 1961 episode of the series Bus Stop.

Marley died on February 2, 1964, in Santa Barbara. He is interred at Hollywood Forever Cemetery in Los Angeles.

== Filmography ==
Film
Year	Film	Notes
1924	Feet of Clay	
1925	The Golden Bed	
1926	The Volga Boatman	Credited as Peverell Marley
1927	Chicago	
1928	Celebrity	
1928	A Lady of Chance	Credited as Peverly Marley
1929	Dynamite	Credited as Peverell Marley
1930	This Mad World	Credited as Peveerell Marley
1932	Fantômas	
1932	Rouletabille the Aviator	
1933	Fast Workers	Credited as Peveral Marley
1933	India Speaks	Credited as Peverall Marley
1934	The House of Rothschild	Credited as Peverell Marley
1934	The Count of Monte Cristo	Credited as Peverell J. Marley
1935	Thanks a Million	Credited as Peverell Marley
1936	Private Number	
1936	Winterset	
1937	The Toast of New York	Credited as Peverell Marley
1938	Sally, Irene and Mary	
1939	The Hound of Baskervilles	Credited as Peverell Marley
1940	The Man I Married	Alternative title: I Married a Nazi
1941	Moon Over Miami	Credited as Peverell Marley
1941	Swamp Water	Credited as Peverell Marley
1945	Pride of the Marines	Credited as Peverell Marley; Alternative title: Forever in Love
1946	Of Human Bondage	Credited as Peverell Marley
1947	The Two Mrs. Carrolls	Credited as Peverell Marley
1948	Whiplash	Credited as Peverell Marley
1949	Night Unto Night	Credited as Peverell Marley
1950	Kiss Tomorrow Goodbye	Credited as Peverell Marley
1953	The Charge at Feather River	
1954	Drum Beat	
1957	The Spirit of St. Louis	With Robert Burks as joint Directors of Photography
1958	The Left Handed Gun	
1961	The Sins of Rachel Cade	
Television
Year	Title	Notes
1958	The Rifleman	Credited as Pev Marley; 1 episode
1959	Lawman	1 episode
1960	77 Sunset Strip	1 episode

== Awards and nominations ==
Year	Association	Category	Work	Result
1939	Academy Awards	Best Cinematography	Suez	Nominated
1948	Academy Awards	Best Cinematography, Color	Life with Father	Nominated
1953	Golden Globe Awards	Best Cinematography – Color	The Greatest Show on Earth (shared with George Barnes)	Won
1937	Venice Film Festival	Best Cinematography	Winterset	Won
