= Tony Gaudio =

Italian-American cinematographer (1883–1951)

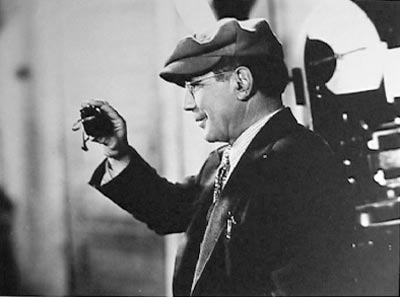
- Tony Gaudio, ASC
- Born: Gaetano Antonio Gaudio; November 20, 1883; Cosenza, Calabria, Italy
- Died: August 10, 1951 (aged 67); Burlingame, California, U.S.
- Title: President of the American Society of Cinematographers
- Term: 1924–1925
- Predecessor: James Van Trees
- Successor: Homer Scott
- Spouse: Rosina Gaudio
- Children: 4
- Relatives: Eugene Gaudio (brother)
- Awards: See below

Gaetano Antonio Gaudio, ASC (20 November 1883 – 10 August 1951) was an Italian-American cinematographer. He is considered a pioneer of motion picture photography during the early 20th-century, and worked on some 150 productions between 1903 and 1949. He won an Academy Award for Best Cinematography for Anthony Adverse (1936), becoming the first Italian-born artist to win an Oscar, with an additional five nominations.

Gaudio pioneered a number of technical and artistic innovations, among them the first montage sequence in a Hollywood film (for 1920's The Mark of Zorro), shooting day-for-night (in 1923's The Song of Love), and shooting the first all-talking, all-color film (1929's On with the Show!). He was among the founders of the American Society of Cinematographers, and served as president from 1924 until 1925.

== Early life and education ==
Born Gaetano Antonio Gaudio in Cosenza, Italy in 1883 to a famous photographic family. The son of one of Italy’s foremost photographic artists, the boy was quite literally brought up in the studio, where he learned at an early age to use the still camera and to develop negatives in the darkroom. His father also gave him a liberal education in lenses, cameras, composition and the manipulation of lights so that when the time came to take up motion photography, the young Tony had a head full of useful information to start with.

At two months old, Tony’s family moved from Cosenza to Rome for a short period in order for Tony to attend art school. He is indebted to his art training for his later interest in the camera as a medium of art, as opposed to a mere recording instrument. Tony was hardly nine years old when he began to play with photographic papers, making his own enlargements. After attending art school in Rome, he became an assistant to his father and older brother, Rafael (Ralph) Gaudio, a prominent portrait photographer in Italy who later became president of the Society of Photography in Europe, and was nominated as Knight of the Crown in Italy for photographic achievement.

Then it became necessary to take time out from the photographic side of his education to go to military school. It was 1900 when he bade good-bye to the army and returned home, where he worked as an apprentice alongside his younger brother Eugenio (Eugene) Gaudio in the family photography studio owned by Rafael, "Foto Gaudio", in the historic center of the Calabrian city.

== Career ==
=== Italy ===
Eventually he segued into cinema, starting with several years with the famous Ambrosio Films in Torino- a film company popular in Italy in the early days of cinema. In 1903, 19-year-old Tony filmed “Napoleon Crossing the Alps”. Years later in a New York Times interview, Tony remembered that his only lighting problem in this film was the sun, which kept ducking behind the clouds. “It was quite bad,” Mr. Gaudio recalled. A young Gaudio shot hundreds of short subjects for Italian film companies, two or three features a week, before emigrating to America in 1906 at the age of 22 together with his brother Eugene, who would follow him to the United States.

=== New York ===
In 1906 a young Gaudio arrived in the United States, moving to New York City. Tony was employed by Al Simpson to produce "song slides" that could be shown in theaters so patrons could sing along with the music. Twelve hand-colored slides were made for each new popular or near popular song. After quitting Simpson in 1908, Tony worked in Vitagraph’s film development laboratories in New York. It was in 1908 that Tony acted as the cinematographer for his first film in the United States, Madame Nicotine. In 1909 the photographer moved to Flatbush — which is now as for many years it has been a part of Brooklyn — where he took full charge of the Vitagraph laboratory.

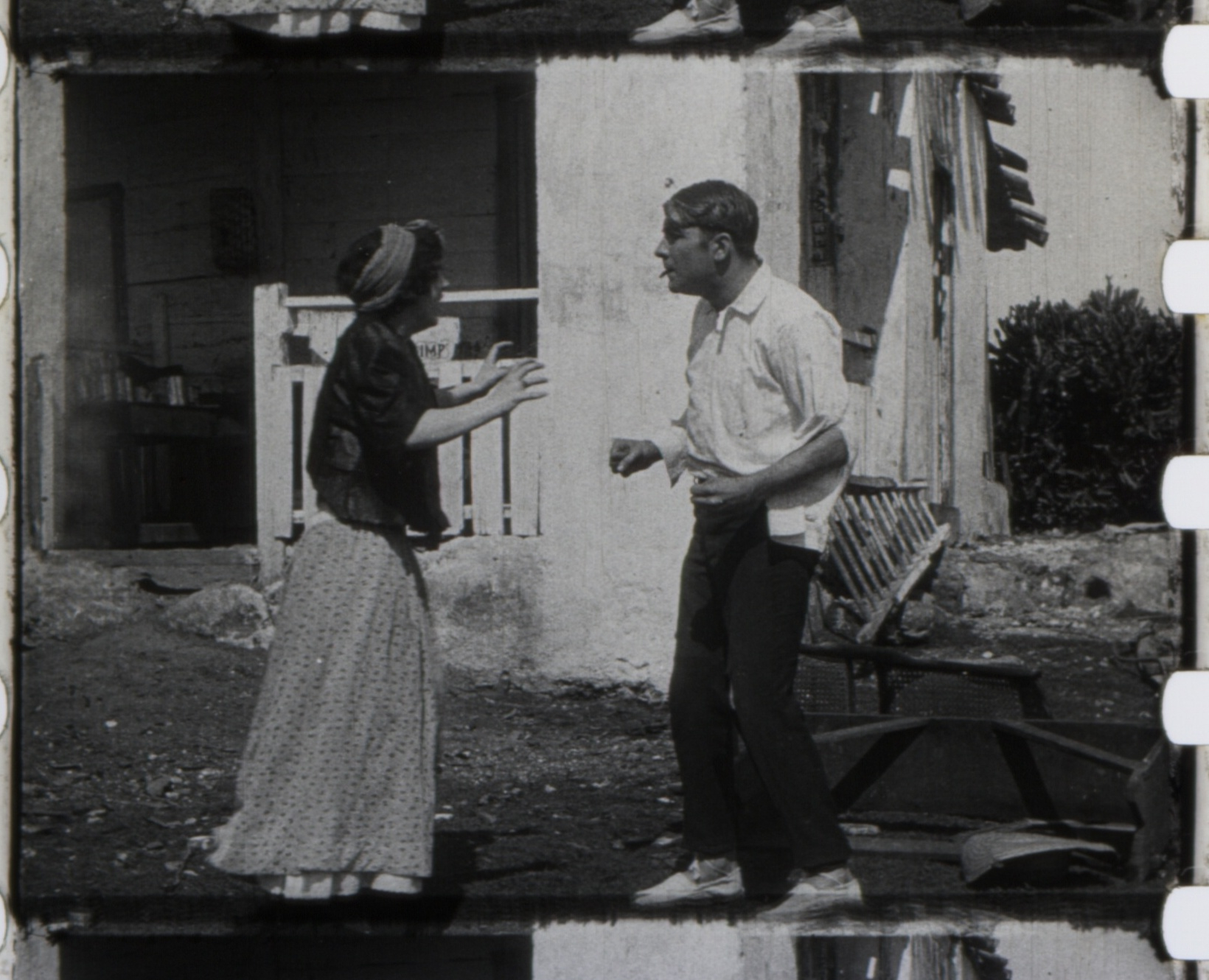
Frame from the previously lost 1911 film Pictureland

Then he moved across the Brooklyn Bridge to Carl Laemmle’s Independent Moving Picture CO., supervising the construction of IMP’s New York laboratories. He had complete charge of both positive and negative departments until perfectly organized when he was promoted to be a studio manager. From 1910-1912 he became the Chief of Cinematography at IMP, shooting one picture a week and fifty a year. The leading players in the Eleventh Avenue studio at that time were Mary Pickford, King Baggot, Joe Smiley, and Owen Moore, among others. There, he shot Mary Pickford’s films for director Thomas H. Ince. In addition to being her cameraman, Gaudio also wrote For the Queen’s Honor (1911), using his writing skills from the many films he wrote and directed in Italy before then. With IMP in 1910, Tony pioneered filming underwater, shooting the first submarine picture, titled “Submarine”. He went down in a submarine at Newport News in Virginia, taking pictures inside a submersible vessel.

He then left IMP to work for Biograph, a studio established in Brooklyn Heights, where he was engaged with the specials the company was making for Klaw and Erlanger, stage producers in New York. Among these specials were Strongheart, and Classmates, with Blanche Sweet and Marshall Nielan. Together, the stage and screen men were adapting plays, one of the earliest instances in which a staged play was converted to the screen. Gaudio remained here until 1915. Gaudio found a home at Metro Pictures by 1916, where his brother Eugene now worked as a director.

=== Hollywood ===
In 1916, Gaudio made the transition to California with a troupe of the early Metro Company, one of the three organizations which would later become Metro-Goldwyn-Mayer, where Eugene now worked as a director. In his unit were Harold Lockwood and May Allison, headed by Richard (Dick) Rowland. At Metro, Tony shot 10 films for director Fred J. Balshofer, produced by Yorke Film Corporation. Following the death of Lockwood in a flu epidemic, Gaudio joined forces with Alan Dwan’s company for such pictures as The Forbidden Thing, and The Sin of Martha. Dawn would also loan would loan Gaudio to R.K.O. in order to photograph the company’s first production, Kismet (1920), with Otis Skinner.

==== 1920s ====
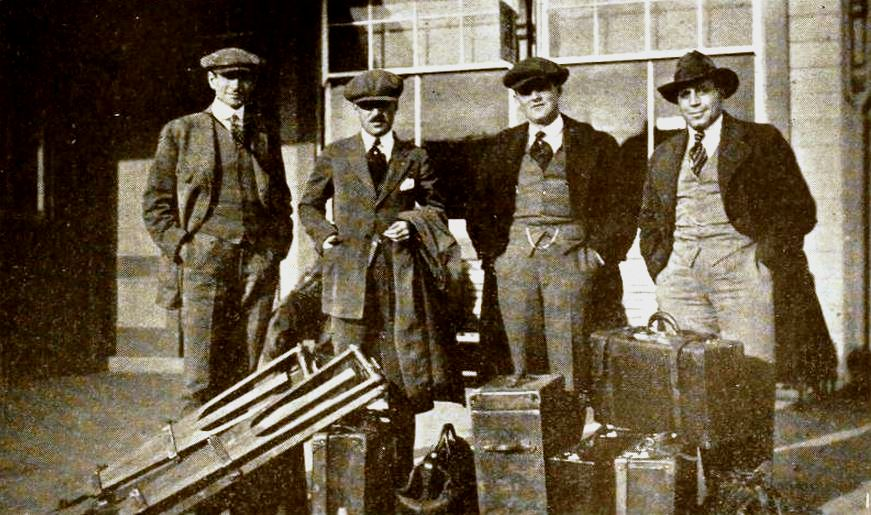
In Old Kentucky (1919): (from left) cinematographer Henry Cronjager, assistant director Alfred E. Green, director Marshall Neilan, and cinematographer Tony Gaudio

Beginning in 1919 and transitioning into the 1920s, Gaudio began his collaboration with First National Pictures, starting with films A Man of Honor, In Wrong, The Red Lantern, and Her Kingdom of Dreams and In Old Kentucky. In 1920, Gaudio photographed Douglas Fairbanks’ The Mark of Zorro, pioneering the use of montage. In 1921, Gaudio photographed “A Bride of the Gods”, later known as Shattered Idols.

The Brahman temple scenes in the film were said to be among the most artistic shots ever made.

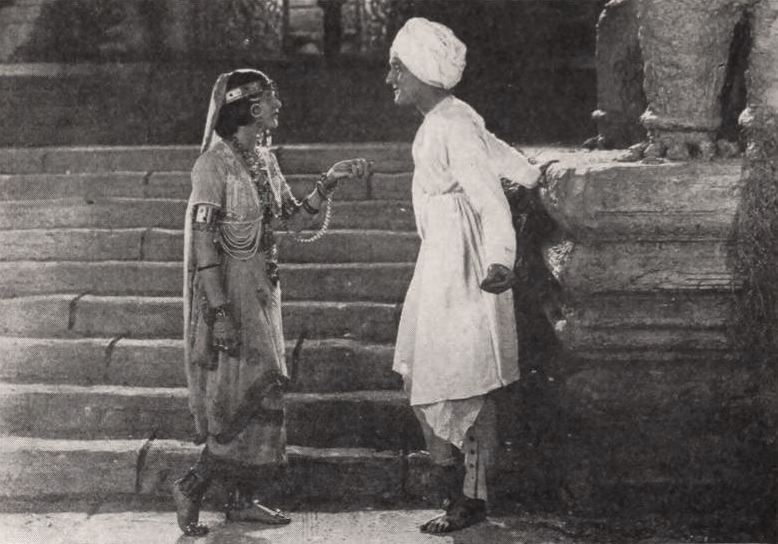
Still from the American drama film Shattered Idols (1922)

Over 1,500,000 candle-power were employed to light up this set, the greater part of the light being supplied by the fifteen sunlight arcs. Gaudio also used four generator sets on the scene. Producer J.L. Frothingham was so pleased with Gaudio’s work on this film that he retained him for his next project, The Woman He Loved. In total, Gaudio and Frothingham collaborated five times on The Ten Dollar Raise, The Other Woman, A Bride of the Gods, The Man Who Smiled and Pilgrim of Night.

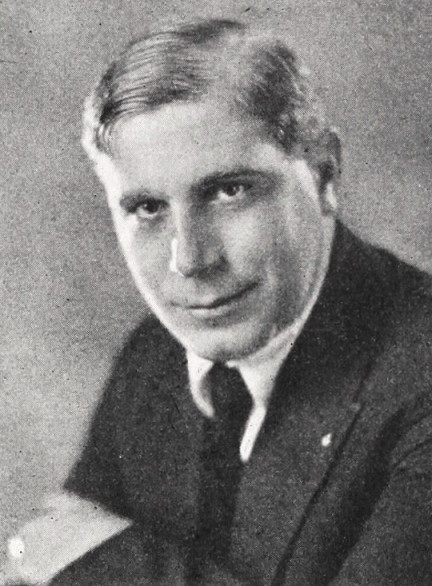
Tony Gaudio, August 1925

After this collaboration, Gaudio stayed with First National Pictures, joining Norma Talmadge under the management of her husband and producer, Joseph Schenck. He was also a cameraman for Norma’s sister Constance Talmadge in East is West. Gaudio was given lavish praise for the photographic excellence of Secrets, directed by Frank Borzage, a long time future collaborator of Gaudio. Arrangements were made whereby he was “farmed out” to other large producers, he having thus photographed John M. Stahl’s Husbands and Lovers, Corrine Griffith’s Déclassée, and Marion Davies in Adam and Eva. For the Corrine Griffith production, the special arrangement was during the vacation of Norma Talmadge. In total, Gaudio photographed 10 Talmadge films from 1922 to 1925 as Chief Cinematographer of Joseph M. Schenck productions, most notably with The Eternal Flame, Secrets, and Ashes of Vengeance.

===== Presidency =====
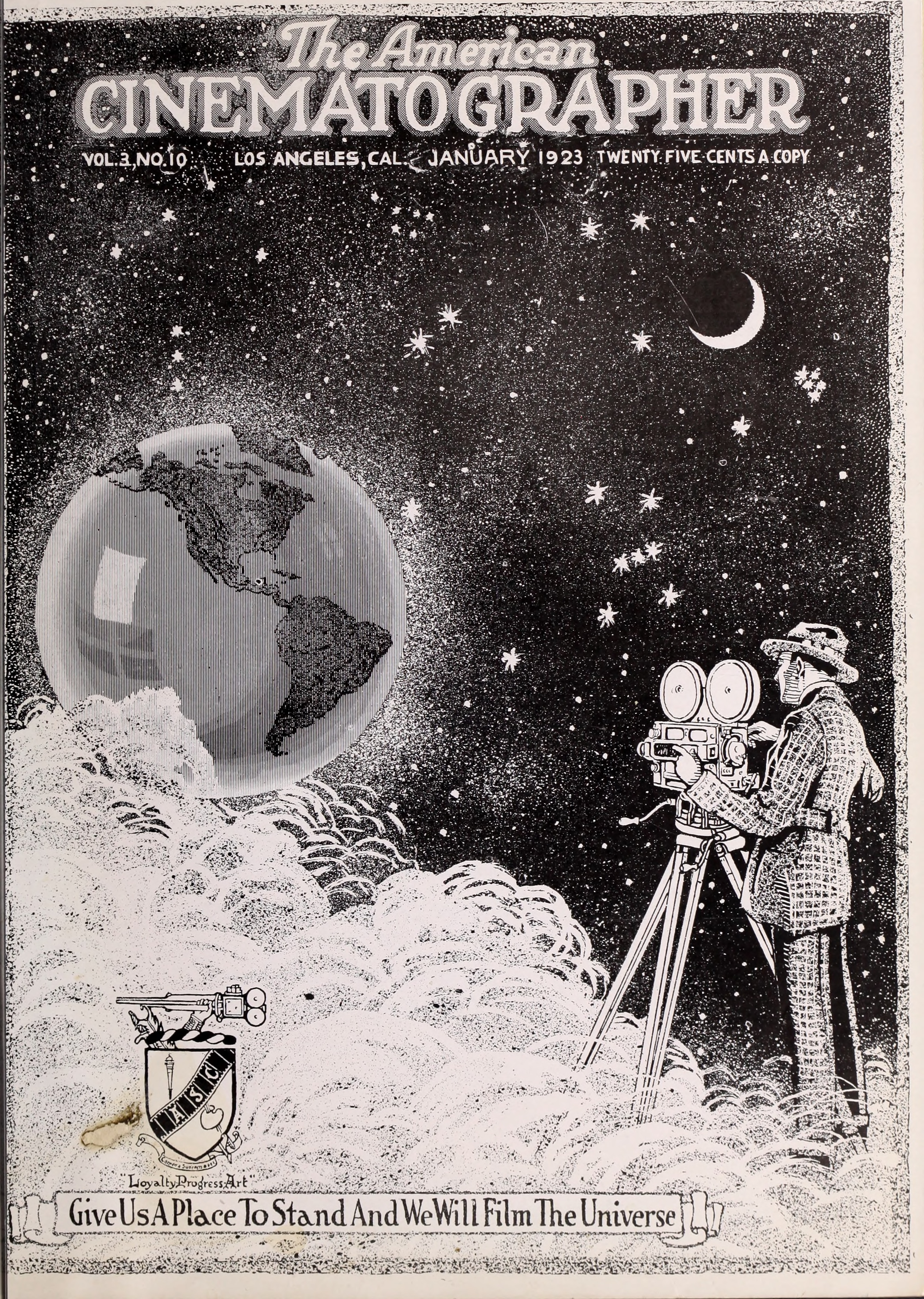
The American Cinematographer. 1923-01 Vol. III no. 10 cover

In 1924, Tony Gaudio was elected president of the American Society of Cinematographers (ASC), the highest honor at the disposal of the cinematographers. ASC is the professional body his brother had helped create to promote standardization in the industry of cinematography, serving as a body of information for cameramen.

At the time of the election, A.S.C. cited Gaudio as one of the world’s foremost cinematographers and pioneers in the industry. Gaudio held the position until 1925.

==== Director ====
In 1925, Tony Gaudio turned to directing for a brief period of time, directing a total of two films. In July 1925 it was announced that Gaudio would be directing the Waldorf special feature production in collaboration with Columbia Pictures, starring Alice Lake and Gaston Glass, with ASC’s Sam Landers as the cinematographer, titled The Price of Success.

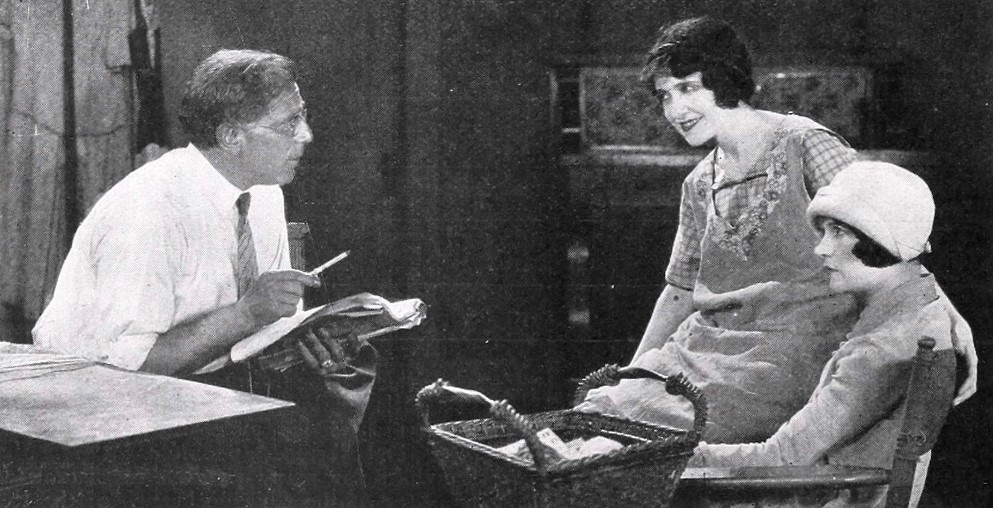
The Price of Success (1925) with film director Tony Gaudio, Florence Turner, and Alice Lake

Gaudio’s direction of the Waldorf production did not interfere with his relations with Joseph M. Schenck. He continued as Chief Cinematographer for Norma Talmadge, filming her next feature and their last together, Graustark. All eyes were on Gaudio for his directorial debut, and Schenck was impressed, clearing the way for Gaudio to direct his second feature film with Waldorf, Sealed Lips, starring Dorothy Revier and Cullen Landis. Schenck waived Gaudio’s contract in what he hoped to be a promising directorial career for the camera veteran.

==== Returning to the camera ====
This directorial streak did not last for long, as Gaudio returned Metro as a cinematographer in 1926 with The Temptress, a Greta Garbo feature in which Tony lost the little finger of his left hand when he fell on the set. Tony continued to work with First National for The Blonde Saint, The Notorious Lady and An Affair of the Follies, in addition to photographing The Gaucho for Fairbanks. Also with First National was Two Arabian Knights and The Racket, both directed by Lewis Milestone, for businessman and producer Howard Hughes in collaboration with United Artists. The Gaucho featured one of the earliest two-strip Technicolor sequences. Gaudio also shot two-strip Technicolor scenes for On with the Show! (1929) and General Crack (1929) for Warner Bros. On with the Show! was the first all-talking, all-color feature. When First National was acquired by Warner Bros. in 1928, Gaudio moved over to the new studio, signing a long-term contract with Warners in 1930.

==== 1930s ====
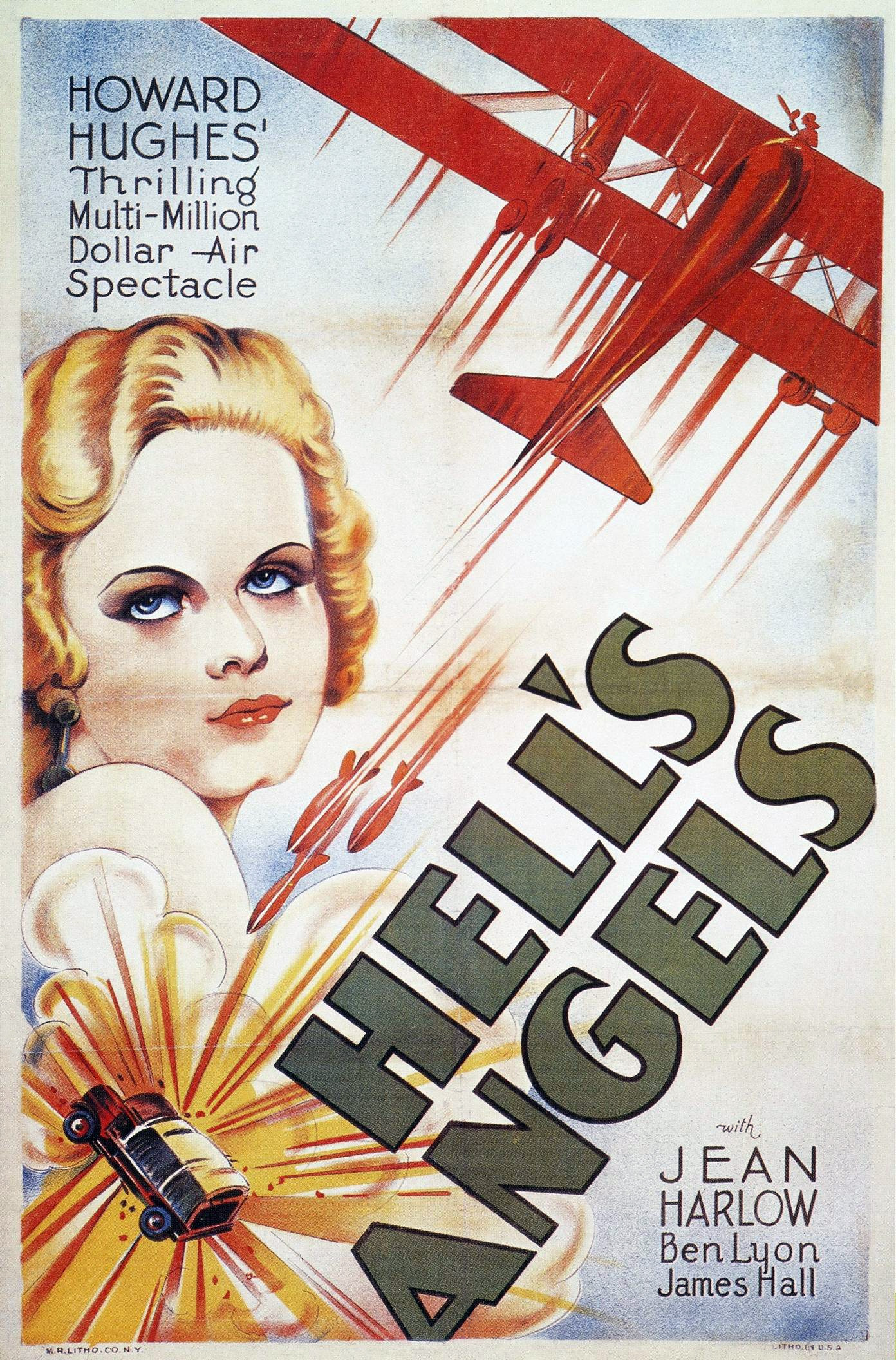
Poster- Hell's Angels (1930)

Gaudio hit his stride after signing with Warner Bros. in 1930, shooting Mervyn LeRoy’s gangster classic Little Caesar (1931), in a harsh style that fit the gritty subject matter. Gaudio contributed to two seminal war films in 1930, acting as second camera to A.S.C.’s Arthur Edeson for All Quiet on the Western Front, and as cinematographer for Hell’s Angels (1930), handling the dialogue scenes with co-cinematographer Harry Perry as well as the aerial cinematography. Hell’s Angels won Gaudio his first Oscar nomination for Best Cinematography, a picture that made records from the photographic side, as the film was exposed for two and a half years. By the time the picture was completed as a silent film, then came the revolution of sound.

Throughout the 1930s, Gaudio collaborated with many directors repeatedly, all under the banner of Warner Bros. Tony Gaudio and Archie Mayo shot four pictures together, including Bordertown, The Man with Two Faces, Go into Your Dance, and The Case of the Lucky Legs. Gaudio was a regular cameraman for starlett Bette Davis. For Ex-Lady (1933), an early attempt to turn her into a sex symbol, Gaudio gave Davis the glamour treatment. By the time he shot Bordertown (1934), the studio realized her histrionic talents, and Gaudio brought a stark realism to the seedy Mexican setting. In 1936, Gaudio shot Warners' first three-strip Technicolor film, God's Country and the Woman, with director William Keighley, a four time collaborator of Gaudio’s. The film was made in exactly 59 shooting days, which included a long and strenuous location trip to northern Washington. With German director William Dieterle, Gaudio photographed eight pictures, most notably The Life of Emile Zola (1937), which one the 1937 Academy Award for Best Picture, and Juarez (1939). Guadio and director Michael Curtiz collaborated six times, notably on The Adventures of Robin Hood (1938), and Kid Galahad (1937), another Bette Davis joint which gave him the opportunity to contrast high-key Art Deco scenes with the smoky interiors of the boxing ring. Another main collaborator was Mervyn Leroy, with whom Gaudio shot six films, notably Anthony Adverse, for which he won his first and only oscar for the 1936 Academy Award for Best Cinematography, Black-and-White.

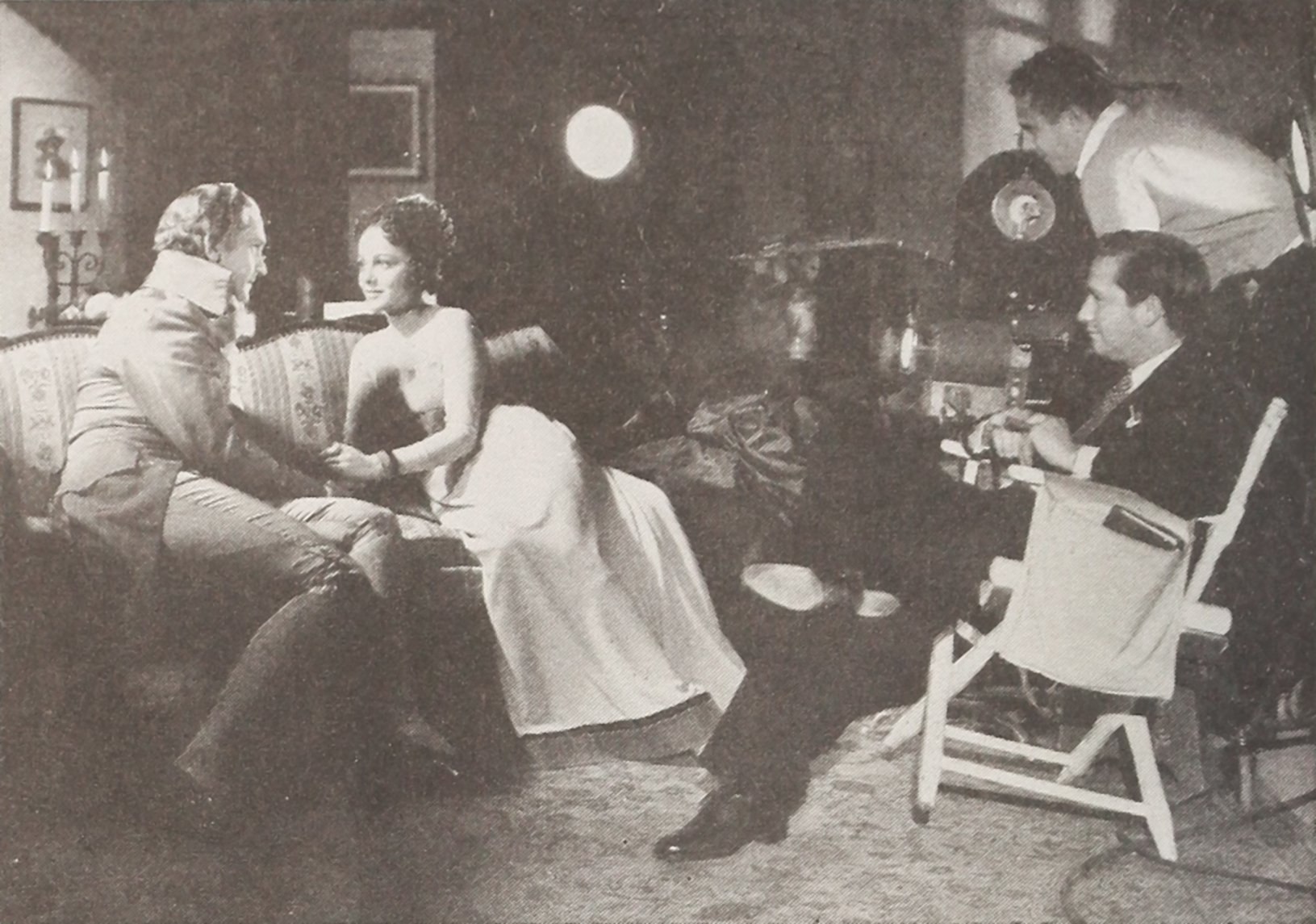
On set of 1936 Anthony Adverse; Mervyn LeRoy (seated right) directing costars March and DeHavilland; behind LeRoy is Tony Gaudio

Upon winning the Oscar, in an interview with The American Cinematographer in April, 1937, Gaudio gushes:

“I am convinced there never has been one of my brother cameramen who was so happy over winning this award as I have been. For me, it has been a deep as it will be an abiding satisfaction. And my gratitude, deeper than words can express, goes to the men and women of this great industry".

The years of 1938 and 1939 are busy times for Gaudio, completing his 1000th picture. Gaudio acted as Director of Photography on Edmund Goulding’s The Dawn Patrol, shooting aerial scenes as well as claustrophobic interiors. As of June 1938, Tony was the oldest cinematographer on features in the world at 55 years old. In an interview with The American Cinematographer in their June, 1938 issue, Tony comments:

“Today’s cameramen are virtually a new race of artists. Sound, with its new requirements, brought a saner approach to motion picture photography. Camera work should be like that of the portrait artist, reality and character with only so much retouching as is necessary to smooth out the rougher spots. Realism and character must be preserved at all costs.”

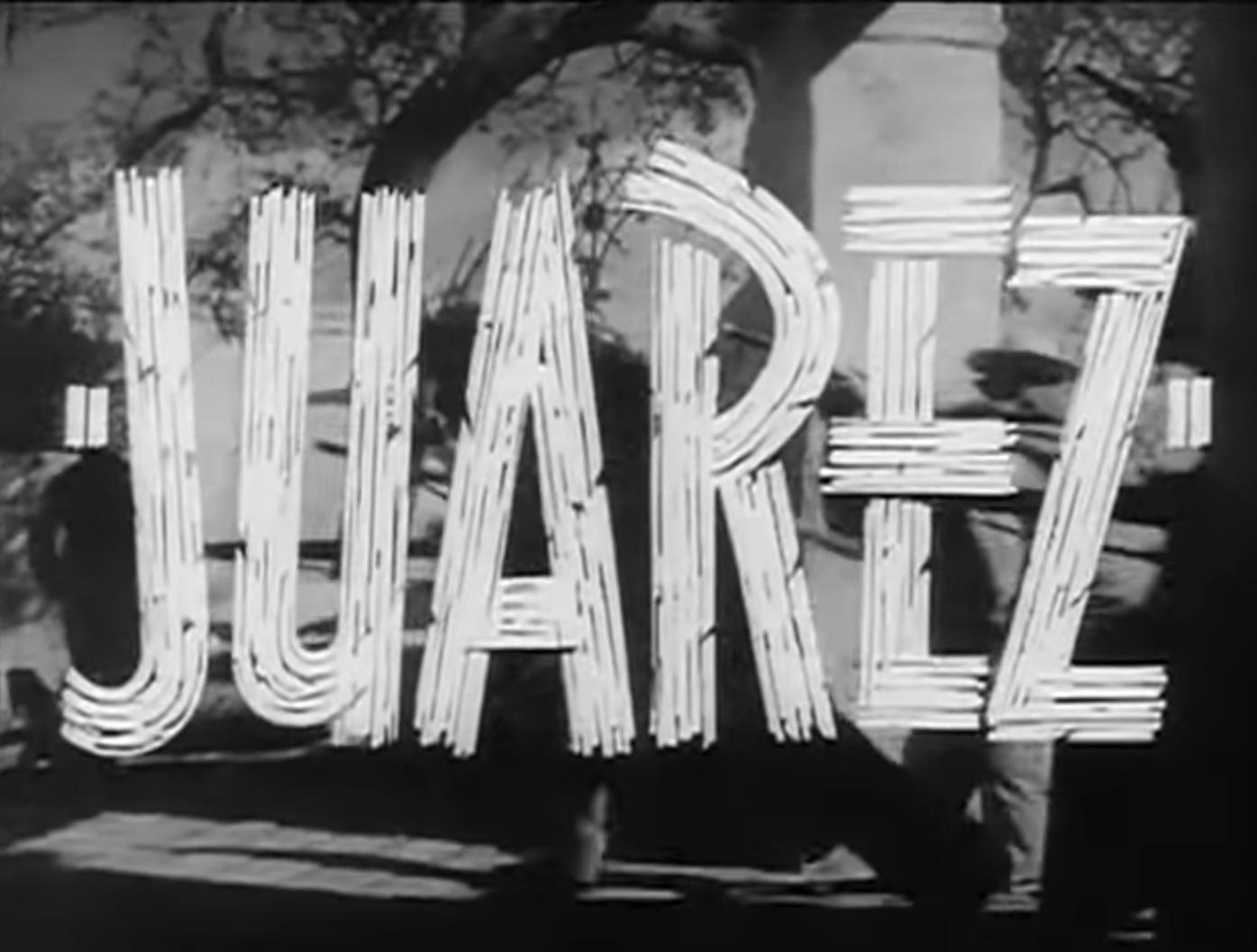
"Juarez" 1939 Title, from Trailer

At the end of the decade, Gaudio photographed two more Bette Davis pictures in which he de-glamorized the actress. This includes The Old Maid (1939) and Juarez (1939), for which he earned the Oscar nomination once again for Best Cinematography, Black-and-White. The picture was the first major subject in Hollywood to be photographed on the new Eastman Plus X Panchromatic film. Not an inch of any other brand was used in the production, declares Tony Gaudio in an interview with The American Cinematographer.

“The Eastman company is responsible for many improvements in photography,” he said, “but I am convinced this stock is not only a distinct advance. It is the best thing Eastman has done for the motion picture industry as a whole.”

In this work he retained the same balance between highlights, half tones and shadows as he had formerly with film that preceded Plus X. This level of illumination was reduced by exactly 50 percent, which saved costs in lighting.

“It is smoother, finer in grain and in speed.” the cameraman said in conclusion. “Yes, I am using Plus X in “The Old Maid”, the picture I am now on, another Bette Davis subject, and I expect to be using it as long as I am in pictures. No, I don’t think there ever will be anything really better.”

==== 1940s ====
Gaudio began the decade of the 1940s while still in collaboration with Warner Bros. With William Keighley, Tony shot The Fighting 69th (1940), which was labeled a “truly brilliant example of screencraft” by The Film Daily. Also in 1940, Gaudio photographed The Letter, a William Wyler picture that gave Tony his 4th Oscar nomination for Best Cinematography, Black-and-White. This was another Bette Davis picture, one that is distinguished by Gaudio's moody cinematography, especially the memorable opening shot, a slow track through a Malaysian rubber plantation that sets the tone for the picture. In 1941, Gaudio lit Raoul Walsh's crime masterwork High Sierra in an ultra realistic, documentary-like fashion that was a precursor of film noir.

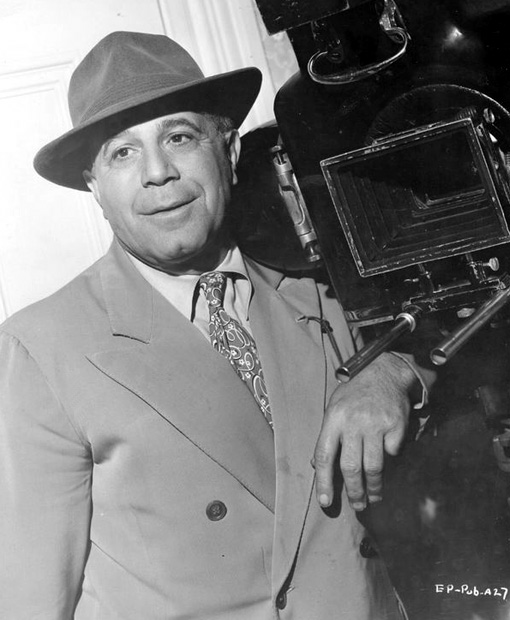
Tony Gaudio on Experiment Perilous, 1944

In the 40s, he photographed seven pictures with Lloyd Bacon under Warner, including Brother Orchid (1940), Affectionately Yours (1942), and Wings for the Eagle (1942). Their collaboration stopped in 1943 when Gaudio left Warner Bros. to go freelance after shooting another Raoul Walsh film, Background to Danger. After leaving the studio, Gaudio only photographed 11 more films before his death in 1951.

His first film that he shot freelance was Corvette K-225 (1943) for Universal Pictures, for which he was nominated for his 5th Academy Award for Best Cinematography, Black-and-White.

Next, he filmed two Jacques Tourner pictures, Experiment Perilous (1944) and Days of Glory (1944). Gaudio joined with Dieterle again for I’ll Be Seeing You (1944) before winning his last Oscar nomination for Best Cinematography, Color in 1946 for A Song To Remember (1945). In 1946, the Gaudio, Borzage, and Republic Pictures collaboration I’ve Always Loved You was a box office hit, winning the Honor Box for the Box Office Digest. In 1946 and 1947, Tony worked on 3 more films before his last film, being Swell Guy with Frank Tuttle, That’s My Man with Frank Borzage, and Love From a Stranger with Richard Whorf. Tony Gaudio’s last film was shot in 1949 with Lewis Milestone and Republic Pictures, titled The Red Pony. It was renowned for its mastery of color.

== Personal life ==
In 1939, Gaudio was nominated by King Victor Emmanuel III of Italy as a Knight of the Crown for his contributions to the art of motion picture photography. Gaudio declined to accept the honor and recognition for his work because it came from a foreign country, despite that country once being his homeland. In an interview with The American Cinematographer in their April, 1939 Issue, Gaudio explained:

"It has nothing to with the present form of government in Italy. Nevertheless, I do not feel that it is right for me, now an American, to accept a foreign order."

After the divorce from his first wife, Rosina Gaudio, which caused a scandal at the time, there was an estrangement with his children. After retiring from work in 1949, Gaudio moved to San Francisco with his second wife, Marie Gaudio.

=== Death ===
Gaudio died at his home on August 10, 1951 in Burlingame, California at the age of 66 of a heart attack. and is interred in the Hollywood Forever Cemetery in Hollywood, California. His brother Eugene Gaudio, also a cinematographer, died in 1920 at the age of 34. Gaudio is survived by his wife, Marie, and two sons- Frank, also a cameraman, and Antonio, a San Francisco Lawyer.

== Legacy ==
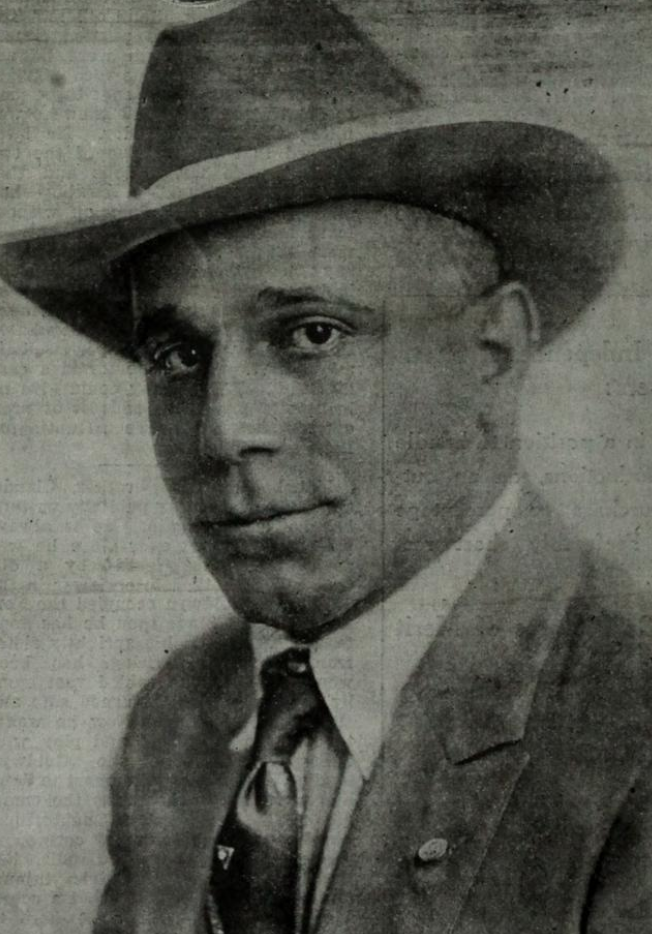
Gaudio circa 1919

Tony Gaudio was an active participant in the technical research initiatives of the American Society of Cinematographers (ASC). His contributions included the development and implementation of monochromatic film, Mazda lighting, and modern makeup.

Gaudio was a revolutionary cinematographer, instituting and influencing many techniques and technologies in the craft. He has pioneered the use of “Dinky Inkies” and “precision lighting”, using spotlights almost to the exclusion of flood-lighting units. In addition, he pioneered the use of the Montage, invented the Mitchell Camera Viewfinder, worked on the first All-talkie and All-color film, as well as revolutionized photographing exterior night scenes during daylight. Gaudio's legacy lives on through his inventive and creative cinematographic mind that still impacts cinema today.

=== The montage ===
Tony Gaudio was the first Hollywood photographer to use a montage. It was produced in a Douglas Fairbanks picture, “Mark of Zorro.”

=== Mitchell Camera viewfinder ===
Tony was at the forefront of technical innovation in the craft of cinematography. A longtime fan and owner of the Mitchell camera, Gaudio was quoted in 1921 as stating that “The Mitchell does everything a camera ought to do and then a lot more”.

In 1922, he invented a viewfinder for the new Mitchell Camera, as well as inventing the camera focusing microscope. In the 1920s, the Hollywood motion picture industry was dominated by Bell and Howell cameras, but Mitchell established a foothold and broke through by the end of the decade, propelled by cinematographers such as Gaudio who advocated for the Mitchell and its positive attributes. While the Bell and Howell produced a superior image due to its innovative pressure plate behind the lens, it was too noisy for sound work, which opened up the market to Mitchell.

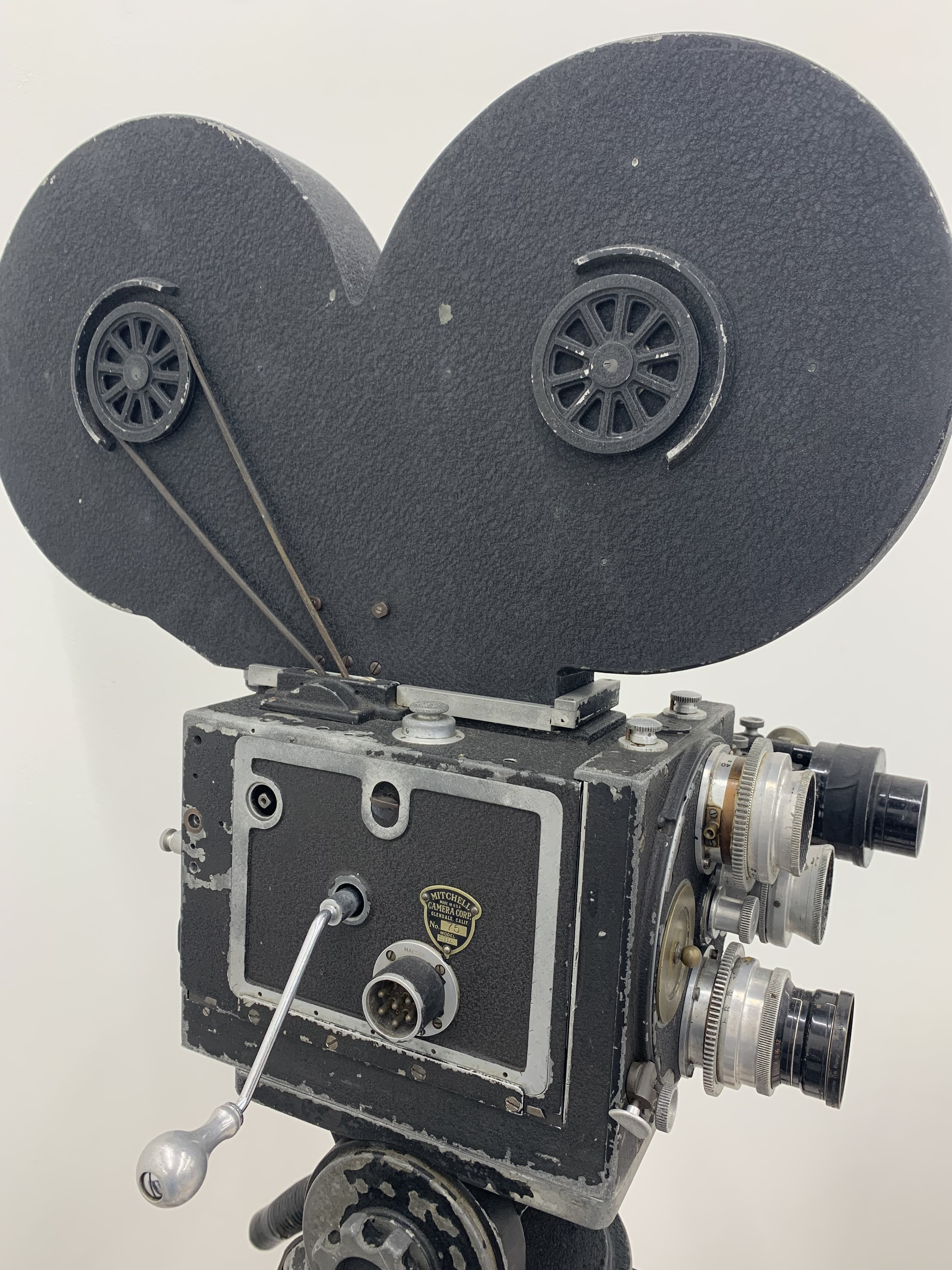
Mitchell Camera circ 1930s

Now, any time anyone looks through the focusing microscope of a Mitchell camera, Tony Gaudio invented it. In the 1920s, when you focused a professional camera, you viewed your image either on the film itself or on a removable ground-glass focusing screen. In either event, if you had a good camera, you probably viewed this image through a simple, low-powered magnifying glass, which still gave you an image which was upside-down and turned around left or right.

Gaudio believed that there was a better way of lining up a shot, and felt it would be easier if you could see your image right side up and laterally correct, and also rather highly magnified. He worked in close collaboration with the Mitchell engineers and with the Bausch and Lomb opticians. Finally after many months of experimentation, a focusing optical system was perfected. For the first time in the history of cinematography, you could look into a camera and see, magnified some 10 diameters, the actual image cast by his lens. By a turn of a small control, the vital center-area of the image could be scanned, with the magnification almost doubled.

=== Device for photographing exterior night scenes in the daytime ===
Gaudio was among the first cinematographers to experiment successfully with the idea of photographing exterior night-scenes in the daytime, with filters. Faced with a unified chorus of “It can’t be done”, he succeeded. In 1923, Gaetano Gaudio invented an epochal device in lighting sets for darkness, paving the way to save millions in film production a year by the elimination of night exterior filming, revolutionizing picture making at night time. While shooting Norma Talmadge’s Joseh M. Schenck drama The Song of Love, Gaudio used his process during three days, in which night scenes of an Algerian village street were taken during the day. Gaudio was never satisfied by artificial night lighting, and looked forward to the entire industry adopting his invention, which inevitably occurred. The invention was perfected after only five weeks of experiment, and can be applied to any camera, having few attachments. The working principle rests in the preparation of the raw film. The new process gives a black sky, a light foreground, a clearly defined skyline, perfect silhouettes and stereoscopic relief with high visibility, to figures both in close-ups and even until their disappearance on the skyline. The shadows of figures walking in moonlight are strongly outlined. Gaudio announced at the time of invention that he was willing to stake his cinematographic reputation on this invention.

=== First all-talkie, all-color film ===
Gaudio photographed On With the Show!, the first “all-talkie” musical in color. In a person essay for The American Cinematographer, Lighting Color on a Black-and-White Schedule from December 1936, Gaetano explained:

"In those days, everything was a problem. Certain colors had to be avoided, since the process wouldn’t reproduce them, others had to be achieved by showing the camera an entirely different tone. But the biggest problem was lighting. The two-color technicolor of those old days demanded an unbelievable amount of light."

Gaudio commented that color did not slow the process down significantly, and on some days they were able to make as many as 22 different set ups, which for a major studio production was about as fast as a black-and-white picture.

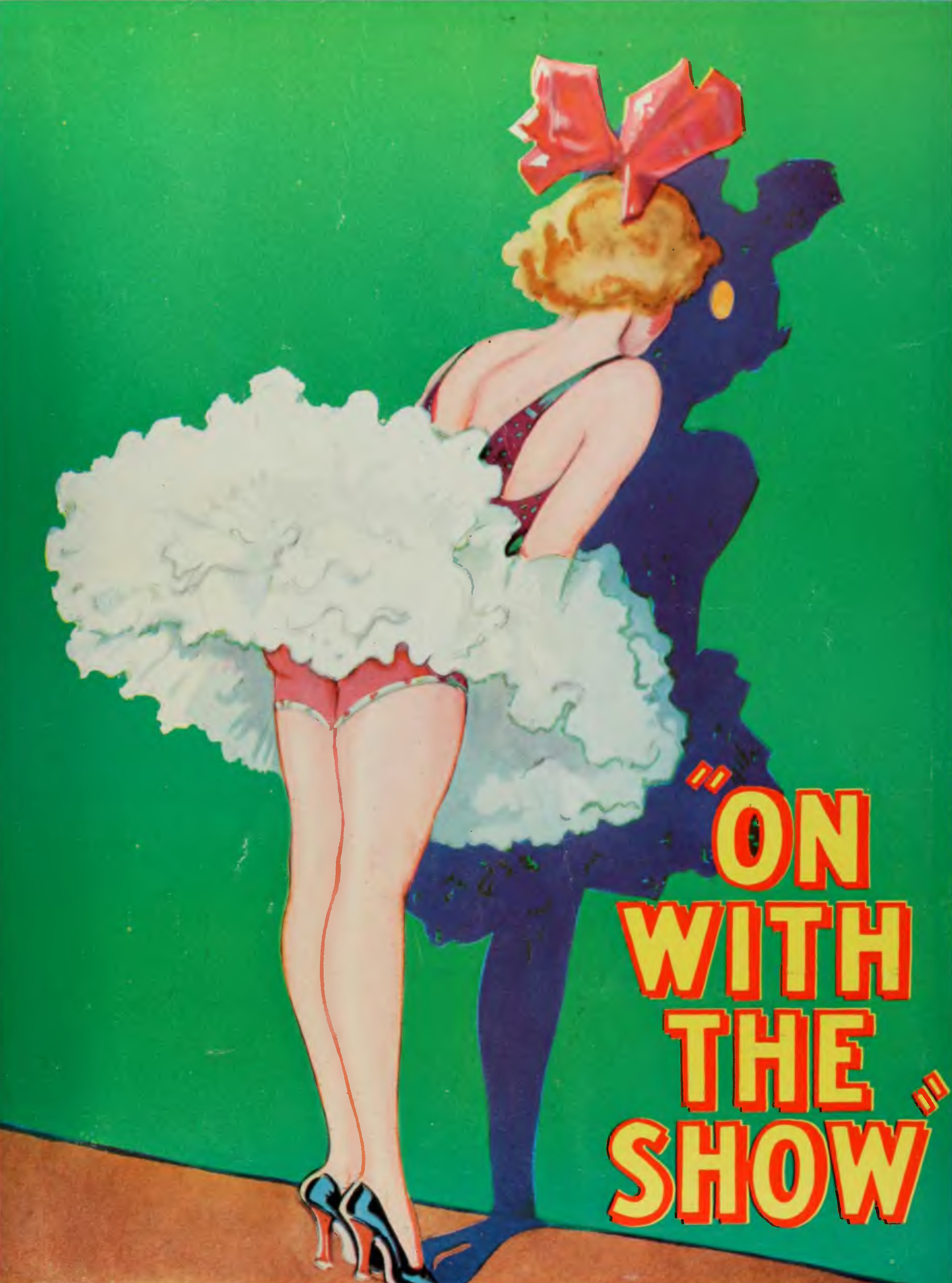
"On With the Show" ad in The Film Daily, Jan-Jun 1929

In addition, Gaudio’s team pioneered something that had not yet been done in a Technicolor production, making projected background process shots. This can be seen in a sequence played in an airplane, flying over the lumber country of the Northwest, and finally landing. Gaudio comments on the development of color in film-making:

"Picture making is picture making no matter what you’re shooting, and those of us who have spent years learning the fundamentals of the job ought to be competent to take a new development like color in our stride. Of course it means new tools to work with, new problems and new ways of expressing many new thoughts: but it is still the same basic job of putting entertainment on celluloid."

=== Documentary ===
The Lost Legacy of Tony Gaudio is an upcoming 2024 documentary that is about to hit festival screens that tells the story of Tony Gaudio from Calabria and Hollywood, exploring the mystery behind the disappearance of his prized statuette, the first Italian Oscar. The story follows Tony Gaudio, little known until a few years ago, born from an initiative to rediscover this artist. The documentary was implemented by the Cineteca della Calabria, which aroused the interest of a group of young authors from Cosenza and their production company "Open Fields".

They proposed the idea of a documentary, obtaining the contribution of the Calabria Film Commission and the support of its counterpart Piedmontese institution. Broken Typewriter Productions from Los Angeles, CA is proud to announce their collaboration with Open Fields Productions from Cosenza, Italy for the feature documentary The Lost Legacy of Tony Gaudio. Open Fields’ Alessandro Nucci (director) and his brother Fabrizio Nucci (Producer) are in cooperation with The Margaret Herrick Academy archives and the American Society of Cinematographers. The website, The Tony Gaudio Foundation for The Cinematic Arts, was set up in efforts to fundraise and spread awareness about the documentary. The foundation’s CEO is Gino Gaudio, great nephew of Tony Gaudio, with the CFO being Chester Hipple, Tony Gaudio’s grandson. In a message on the website, it reads:

"His name and contributions have been lost to the public. We would like the Gaudio name to live on and be remembered and celebrated from this day forward. “We trust The Lost Legacy of Tony Gaudio documentary will be a beautiful reminder for all film lovers of the important role of the cinematographer in films.”

In April, in Gaetano Gaudio’s hometown, the first screening of the trailer of the documentary will be played.

"It is the story of the first Italian winner of an Oscar, but it is also the discovery of an innovator in the field of photography; it is, at the same time, the story of the birth of cinema, in Italy and the United States, the discovery of techniques and perspectives; it is the story of the emigration of Italians; and it is also an investigation - punctuated by a fictional part - in search of the statuette won almost 90 years ago and of which traces have been lost."

The documentary will feature interviews - combined with images of the works - from some American teachers and scholars and entertainment industry professionals of Italy and the US. These include Patrick Keating and Jonathan Kuntz, or personalities of US cinema, such as the Oscar winner Richard Edlund, special visual effects supervisor of films such as Star Wars, or M. David Mullen, director of photography of The Marvelous Mrs. Maisel. In addition, there will be interviews from the president of the Cineteca della Calabria, Eugenio Attanasio, and from the Calabrian director of photography and Oscar winner for Avatar, Mauro Fiore. The film will also feature interviews from Gaudio’s relatives.

“This documentary – explains the director – posed a series of problems from the beginning: very little repertoire, no private photos, perhaps due to a fire that would have destroyed all the albums, and less than 100 public photos. Involving the family was absolutely necessary."

After Gaudio's death, all traces of the Oscar were lost, intersecting a line between the emotional story of the grandchildren and the artistic path of the pioneer cinematographer.

== Awards and nominations ==
Academy Awards
Year	Category	Film	Result
1930	Best Cinematography	Hell's Angels	Nominated
1936	Best Cinematography, Black-and-White	Anthony Adverse	Won
1939	Best Cinematography, Black-and-White	Juarez	Nominated
1940	Best Cinematography, Black-and-White	The Letter	Nominated
1943	Best Cinematography, Black-and-White	Corvette K-225	Nominated
1945	Best Cinematography, Color	A Song to Remember	Nominated

== Filmography ==
(as per International Dictionary of Film and Filmmakers and as per AFI's database))
Year	Title	Role	Production/Distribution Co.	Director	Notes
1903	Napoleon Crossing the Alps	Director Cinematographer		Tony Gaudio	1st film, Italy
1908	Madame Nicotine	Cinematographer			
1910	Submarine	Cinematographer	Pr./Dist. Independent Motion Pictures		1st underwater feature
1911	Shorts: Pictureland, The Dream, Maid or Man, At the Duke's Command, The Mirror, The Message in the Bottle, Her Darkest Hour, Artful Kate, A Manly Man, The Fisher-Maid, In Old Madrid, Sweet Memories, The Stampede, The Fair Dentist, For Her Brother's Sake, The Master and the Man, At a Quarter of Two, The Lighthouse Keeper, A Gasoline Engagement, Science, The Skating Bug, The Call of the Song, The Toss of a Coin, The Sentinel Asleep, The Better Way, His Dress Shirt, From the Bottom of the Sea	Cinematographer	Pr./Dist. Independent Motion Pictures	Thomas Ince	
1911	For the Queen's Honor	Cinematographer Writer	Pr./Dist. Independent Motion Pictures	Thomas Ince	
1911	Their First Misunderstanding	Cinematographer	Pr./Dist. Independent Motion Pictures	Thomas Ince, G. Tucker	
1911	Second Sight	Cinematographer	Pr./Dist. Independent Motion Pictures	Thomas Ince, J. Smiley	
1911	In the Sultan's Garden	Cinematographer	Pr./Dist. Independent Motion Pictures	Thomas Ince, W. Clifford	
1911	The Rose's Story	Cinematographer	Pr./Dist. Independent Motion Pictures	J. Smiley, G. Tucker	
1912	The Rose of California	Camera	Pr./Dist. Independent Motion Pictures	Francis J. Grandon	
1914	Classmates	Cinematographer	Pr./Dist. Biograph Company	James Kirkwood	
1914	Strongheart	Cinematographer	Pr. Klaw & Erlanger Dist. Biograph Company	James Kirkwood	
1914	The Cricket on the Hearth	Cinematographer	Pr./Dist. Biograph Company	Lawrence Marsten	
1914	The Woman in Black	Cinematographer	Pr. Biograph Company Dist. General Film Company	Lawrence Marsten	
1916	The Unpardonable Sin	Cinematographer	Pr. Shubert Film Corp.	Barry O'Neill	
1916	The Masked Rider	Cinematographer	Pr. Quality Pictures Co. Dist. Metro Pictures	Fred J. Balshofer	
1916	The River of Romance	Cinematographer	Pr. Yorke Film Corporation Dist. Metro Pictures	Fred J. Balshofer	
1916	Big Tremaine	Cinematographer	Pr. Yorke Film Corporation Dist. Metro Pictures	Henry Otto	
1916	Mister 44	Cinematographer	Pr. Yorke Film Corporation Dist. Metro Pictures	Henry Otto	
1916	Pidgin Island	Cinematographer	Pr. Yorke Film Corporation Dist. Metro Pictures	Fred J. Balshofer	
1917	The Hidden Spring	Cinematographer	Pr. Yorke Film Corporation Dist. Metro Pictures	E. Mason Hopper	
1917	The Promise	Cinematographer	Pr. Yorke Film Corporation Dist. Metro Pictures	Jay Hunt	
1917	The Haunted Pajamas	Cinematographer	Pr. Yorke Film Corporation Dist. Metro Pictures	Fred J. Balshofer	
1917	Under Handicap	Cinematographer	Pr. Yorke Film Corporation Dist. Metro Pictures	Fred J. Balshofer	
1917	Paradise Garden	Cinematographer	Pr. Yorke Film Corporation Dist. Metro Pictures	Fred J. Balshofer	
1917	The Hidden Children	Cinematographer	Pr. Yorke Film Corporation Dist. Metro Pictures	Oscar Apfel	
1917	The Square Deceiver	Cinematographer	Pr. Yorke Film Corporation Dist. Metro Pictures	Fred J. Balshofer	
1917	The Avenging Trail	Cinematographer	Pr. Yorke Film Corporation Dist. Metro Pictures	Francis Ford	
1918	Broadway Bill	Cinematographer	Pr. Yorke Film Corporation Dist. Metro Pictures	Fred J. Balshofer	
1918	The Landloper	Cinematographer	Pr. Yorke Film Corporation Dist. Metro Pictures	George Irving	
1918	Lend Me Your Name	Cinematographer	Pr. Yorke Film Corporation Dist. Metro Pictures	Fred J. Balshofer	
1918	Pals First	Cinematographer	Pr. Yorke Film CorporationDist. First National	Edwin Carewe	
1919	The Unpardonable Sin	Cinematographer	Pr. Hary Garson Production Dist. World Pictures	Marshall Neilan	Co. Cronjaner
1919	A Man of Honor	Cinematographer	Dist. First National	Fred J. Balshofer	
1919	In Wrong	Cinematographer	Dist. First National	James Kirkwood	
1919	Atonement	Cinematographer	Pr. Humphrey Pictures Dist. Pioneer Pictures	William J. Humphrey	
1919	The Red Lantern	Cinematographer	Pr. Nazimova ProductionsDist. Metro Pictures	Albert Capellani	
1919	Her Kingdom of Dreams	Cinematographer	Pr. Louis B. Mayer Dist. First National	Marshall Neilan	
1920	The Inferior Sex	Cinematographer	Pr. Chaplin-Mayers Dist. First National	Joseph Henabery	
1920	In Old Kentucky	Cinematographer	Pr. Louis B. Mayer Dist. First National	Marshall Neilan	
1920	Whispering Devils	Cinematographer	Pr. Harry Garson Production Dist. Equity Pictures	Harry Garson	
1920	Fighting Shepherdess	Cinematographer	Pr. Louis B. Mayer Dist. First National	Edward Jose	
1920	The Mark of Zorro	Cinematographer	Pr. Douglas Fairbanks Dist. United Artists	Fred Niblo	Montage
1920	An Adventuress	Cinematographer	Pr. Yorke Film CorporationDist. Republic Distributing	Fred J. Balshofer	
1920	Kismet	Cinematographer	Pr. Waldorf Productions Dist. Robertson-Cole	Louis J. Gasnier	
1920	The Forbidden Thing	Cinematographer	Pr. Allan Dwan ProductionsDist. Associated Producers	Allan Dwan	
1921	The Sin of Martha Queed	Cinematographer	Pr. Mayflower PhotoplayDist. Associated Exhibitors	Allan Dwan	
1921	The Other Woman	Cinematographer	Pr. J.L. FrothinghamProductions Dist. Hodkinson Pictures	Edward Sloman	
1921	The Ten Dollar Raise	Cinematographer	Pr. J.L. Frothingham Productions Dist. Associated Producers	Edward Sloman	
1921	The Sin of Martha Queed	Cinematographer	Pr. Mayflower Photoplay Dist. Associated Exhibitors	Allan Dwan	
1921	Pilgrims of the Night	Cinematographer	Pr. J.L. FrothinghamProductions Dist. First National	Edward Sloman	
1922	Shattered Idols	Cinematographer	Pr. J.L. FrothinghamProductions Dist. First National	Edward Sloman	
1922	The Eternal Flame	Cinematographer	Pr. Talmadge ProductionsDist. First National	Frank Lloyd	
1922	The Woman He Loved	Cinematographer	Pr. J.L. FrothinghamProductions Dist. American Releasing	Edward Sloman	
1922	East is West	Cinematographer	Pr. Talmadge ProductionsDist. First National	Sidney Franklin	
1923	The Voice from the Minaret	Cinematographer	Pr. Talmadge ProductionsDist. First National	Frank Lloyd	
1923	Adam and Eva	Cinematographer	Pr. Cosmopolitan Prod. Dist. Paramount Pictures	Robert G. Vignola	
1923	Within the Law	Cinematographer	Pr. Talmadge Productions Dist. First National	Frank Lloyd	
1923	The Song of Love	Cinematographer	Pr. Talmadge ProductionsDist. First National	C. Franklin, F. Marion	
1923	Ashes of Vengeance	Cinematographer	Pr. Talmadge ProductionsDist. First National	Frank Lloyd	
1924	Secrets	Cinematographer	Pr. Talmadge ProductionsDist. First National	Frank Borzage	
1924	Husbands and Lovers	Cinematographer	Pr. Louis B. Mayer Dist. First National	John M. Stahl	
1924	The Only Woman	Cinematographer	Pr. Talmadge ProductionsDist. First National	Sidney Olcott	
1925	The Lady	Cinematographer	Pr. Talmadge ProductionsDist. First National	Frank Borzage	
1925	Déclassée	Cinematographer	Pr./Dist. First National	Robert G. Vignola	
1925	Sealed Lips	Director	Pr. Waldorf Productions Dist. Columbia Pictures	Tony Gaudio	U.S. Directorial Debut
1925	The Price of Success	Director	Pr. Waldorf Productions Dist. Columbia Pictures	Tony Gaudio	
1925	Graustark	Cinematographer	Pr. Talmadge ProductionsDist. First National	Dimitri Buchowetzki	
1926	The Temptress	Cinematographer	Pr./Dist. Metro-Goldwyn-Mayer	Fred Niblo	
1926	The Gay Deceiver	Cinematographer	Pr./Dist. Metro-Goldwyn-Mayer	John M. Stahl	co. Max Fabian
1926	Upstage	Cinematographer	Pr./Dist. Metro-Goldwyn-Mayer	Monta Bell	
1926	The Blonde Saint	Cinematographer	Pr. Sam E. Rork Productions Dist. First National	Svend Gade	
1927	An Affair of the Follies	Cinematographer	Pr. Al Rockett ProductionsDist. First National	Millard Webb	
1927	The Notorious Lady	Cinematographer	Pr. Sam E. Rork Productions Dist. First National	King Baggott	
1927	Two Arabian Knights	Cinematographer	Pr. Howard Hughes Dist. United Artists	Lewis Milestone	
1927	The Gaucho	Cinematographer	Pr. Douglas Fairbanks Dist. United Artists	F. Richard Jones	
1928	The Racket	Cinematographer	Pr. Howard Hughes Dist. Paramount Pictures	Lewis Milestone	
1929	She Goes to War	Cinematographer	Pr. Inspiration Pictures	Henry King	Co. John P. Fulton
1929	Tiger Rose	Cinematographer	Pr./Dist. Warner Bros.	George Fitzmaurice	
1929	On with the Show!	Cinematographer	Pr./Dist. Warner Bros.	Alan Crosland	1st all-talking all-color feature
1929	General Crack	Cinematographer	Pr./Dist. Warner Bros.	Alan Crosland	
1930	Hell's Angels	Cinematographer	Pr. Howard Hughes Dist. Warner Bros.	Howard Hughes	co. H.Perry Oscar nom
1930	Little Caesar	Cinematographer	Pr. First National Dist. Warner Bros.	Mervyn LeRoy	
1930	All Quiet on the Western Front	2nd Cameraman	Pr. Universal Studios Dist. Universal Pictures	Lewis Milestone	cin. Edeson
1931	The Lady Who Dared	Cinematographer	Pr. First National Dist. Warner Bros.	William Beaudine	
1931	The Front Page	Cinematographer	Pr. Howard Hughes Dist. United Artists	Lewis Milestone	
1932	Tiger Shark	Cinematographer	Pr./Dist. First National	Howard Hawks	
1932	Sky Devils	Cinematographer	Pr. The Caddo Co. Dist. First National	Edward Sutherland, Busby Berkeley	
1932	The Mask of Fu Manchu	Cinematographer	Pr. Cosmopolitan Prod. Dist. Metro-Goldwyn-Mayer	Charles Brabin	
1933	Blondie Johnson	Cinematographer	Pr./Dist. Warner Bros.	Ray Enright	
1933	Ex-Lady	Cinematographer	Pr./Dist. Warner Bros.	Robert Florey	
1933	The Silk Express	Cinematographer	Pr./Dist. Warner Bros.	Ray Enright	
1933	The Narrow Corner	Cinematographer	Pr./Dist. Warner Bros.	Alfred E. Green	
1933	Private Detective 62	Cinematographer	Pr./Dist. Warner Bros.	Michael Curtiz	
1933	Voltaire	Cinematographer	Pr./Dist. Warner Bros.	John G. Adolfi	
1933	Ladies Must Love	Cinematographer	Pr./Dist. Universal Pictures	E. A. Dupont	
1933	The World Changes	Cinematographer	Pr. First National Dist. Warner Bros.	Mervyn LeRoy	
1933	Lady Killer	Cinematographer	Pr./Dist. Warner Bros.	Roy D. Ruth	
1934	Mandalay	Cinematographer	Pr. First National Dist. Warner Bros.	Michael Curtiz	
1934	Upper World	Cinematographer	Pr./Dist. Warner Bros.	Roy D. Ruth	
1934	Fog Over Frisco	Cinematographer	Pr. First National Dist. Warner Bros.	William Dieterle	
1934	The Dragon Murder Case	Cinematographer	Pr. First National Dist. Warner Bros.	H. Bruce Humberstone	
1934	Happiness Ahead	Cinematographer	Pr. First National Dist. Warner Bros.	Mervyn LeRoy	
1934	Bordertown	Cinematographer	Pr./Dist. Warner Bros.	Archie Mayo	
1934	The Man with Two Faces	Cinematographer	Pr. First National Dist. Warner Bros.	Archie Mayo	
1935	The White Cockatoo	Cinematographer	Pr./Dist. Warner Bros.	Alan Crosland	
1935	Sweet Music	Cinematographer	Pr./Dist. Warner Bros.	Alfred E. Green	co. James Van Trees
1935	Oil for the Lamps of China	Cinematographer	Pr./Dist. First National	Mervyn LeRoy	
1935	Go into Your Dance	Cinematographer	Pr. First National Dist. Warner Bros.	Archie Mayo	
1935	Little Big Shot	Cinematographer	Pr./Dist. Warner Bros.	Michael Curtiz	
1935	Front Page Woman	Cinematographer	Pr./Dist. Warner Bros.	Michael Curtiz	
1935	The Case of the Lucky Legs	Cinematographer	Pr./Dist. Warner Bros.	Archie Mayo	
1935	Dr. Socrates	Cinematographer	Pr./Dist. Warner Bros.	William Dieterle	
1936	The White Angel	Cinematographer	Pr./Dist. Warner Bros.	William Dieterle	
1936	God's Country and the Woman	Cinematographer	Pr./Dist. Warner Bros.	William Keighley	
1936	Anthony Adverse	Cinematographer	Pr./Dist. Warner Bros.	Mervyn LeRoy	Oscar win
1936	The Story of Louis Pasteur	Cinematographer	Pr./Dist. Warner Bros.	William Dieterle	
1937	The Life of Emile Zola	Cinematographer	Pr./Dist. Warner Bros.	William Dieterle	
1937	The King and the Chorus Girl	Cinematographer	Pr./Dist. Warner Bros.	Mervyn LeRoy	
1937	Kid Galahad	Cinematographer	Pr./Dist. Warner Bros.	Michael Curtiz	
1937	Another Dawn	Cinematographer	Pr./Dist. Warner Bros.	William Dieterle	
1937	San Quentin	2nd Photography	Pr./Dist. Warner Bros.	Lloyd Bacon	
1938	Torchy Blane in Panama	Cinematographer	Pr./Dist. Warner Bros.	William Clemens	
1938	The Adventures of Robin Hood	Cinematographer	Pr./Dist. Warner Bros.	Michael Curtiz, William Keighley	Co. Sol Polito
1938	The Amazing Dr. Clitterhouse	Cinematographer	Pr./Dist. Warner Bros.	Anatole Litvak	
1938	Garden of the Moon	Cinematographer	Pr./Dist. Warner Bros.	Bubsy Berkeley	1000th film
1938	The Sisters	Cinematographer	Pr./Dist. Warner Bros.	Anatole Litvak	
1938	The Dawn Patrol	Cinematographer	Pr./Dist. Warner Bros.	Edmund Goulding	
1939	Juarez	Cinematographer	Pr./Dist. Warner Bros.	William Dieterle	Oscar nom
1939	The Old Maid	Cinematographer	Pr./Dist. Warner Bros.	Edmund Goulding	
1939	We Are Not Alone	Cinematographer	Pr. First National Dist. Warner Bros.	Edmund Goulding	
1940	The Fighting 69th	Cinematographer	Pr./Dist. Warner Bros.	William Keighley	
1940	'Til We Meet Again	Cinematographer	Pr./Dist. Warner Bros.	Edmund Goulding, Anatole Litvak	
1940	Brother Orchid	Cinematographer	Pr./Dist. Warner Bros.	Lloyd Bacon	
1940	Knute Rockne, All American	Cinematographer	Pr./Dist. Warner Bros.	Lloyd Bacon	
1940	The Letter	Cinematographer	Pr./Dist. Warner Bros.	William Wyler	Oscar nom
1941	High Sierra	Cinematographer	Pr./Dist. Warner Bros.	Raoul Walsh	
1941	The Great Lie	Cinematographer	Pr./Dist. Warner Bros.	Edmund Goulding	
1941	Affectionately Yours	Cinematographer	Pr./Dist. Warner Bros.	Lloyd Bacon	
1941	Navy Blues	Cinematographer	Pr./Dist. Warner Bros.	Lloyd Bacon	
1941	The Man Who Came to Dinner	Cinematographer	Pr./Dist. Warner Bros.	William Keighley	
1942	Larceny, Inc.	Cinematographer	Pr./Dist. Warner Bros.	Lloyd Bacon	
1942	Wings for the Eagle	Cinematographer	Pr./Dist. Warner Bros.	Lloyd Bacon	
1942	You Can't Escape Forever	Cinematographer	Pr./Dist. Warner Bros.	Jo Graham	co. James Van Trees
1943	Action in the North Atlantic	Cinematographer	Pr./Dist. Warner Bros.	Lloyd Bacon	
1943	The Constant Nymph	Cinematographer	Pr./Dist. Warner Bros.	Edmund Goulding	
1943	Background to Danger	Cinematographer	Pr./Dist. Warner Bros.	Raoul Walsh	
1943	Corvette K-225	Cinematographer	Pr./Dist. Universal Pictures	Richard Rosson	Oscar nom
1944	Days of Glory	Cinematographer	Pr./Dist. RKO Radio Pictures	Jacques Tourner	
1944	Experiment Perilous	Cinematographer	Pr./Dist. RKO Radio Pictures	Jacques Tourner	
1944	I'll Be Seeing You	Cinematographer	Pr./Dist. United Artists	William Dieterle	
1945	A Song to Remember	Cinematographer	Pr./Dist. Columbia Pictures	Charles Vidor	Oscar nom
1946	The Bandit of Sherwood Forest	Cinematographer	Pr./Dist. Columbia Pictures	Henry Levin, George Sherman	
1946	I've Always Loved You	Cinematographer	Pr./Dist. Republic Pictures	Frank Borzage	
1946	Swell Guy	Cinematographer	Pr./Dist. Universal Pictures	Frank Tuttle	
1947	That's My Man	Cinematographer	Pr./Dist. Republic Pictures	Frank Borzage	
1947	Love from a Stranger	Cinematographer	Pr. Bryan Foy Productions Dist. Eagle-Lion Films	Richard Whorf	
1949	The Red Pony	Cinematographer	Pr./Dist. Republic Pictures	Lewis Milestone	
