= The Ten Dollar Raise =

1921 film directed by Edward Sloman

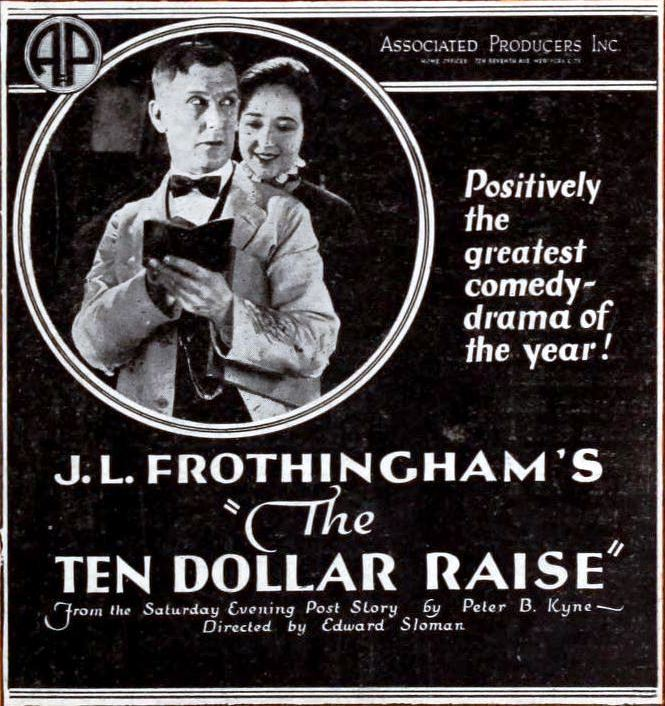
- Advertisement
- Directed by: Edward Sloman
- Written by: Peter B. Kyne; Albert S. Le Vino
- Produced by: J. L. Frothingham
- Starring: William V. Mong; Marguerite De La Motte; Pat O'Malley
- Cinematography: Tony Gaudio
- Production company: J. L. Frothingham Productions
- Distributed by: Associated Producers
- Release date: June 26, 1921
- Running time: 60 minutes
- Country: United States
- Language: Silent (English intertitles)

The Ten Dollar Raise is a lost 1921 American silent comedy film directed by Edward Sloman and starring William V. Mong, Marguerite De La Motte, and Pat O'Malley.

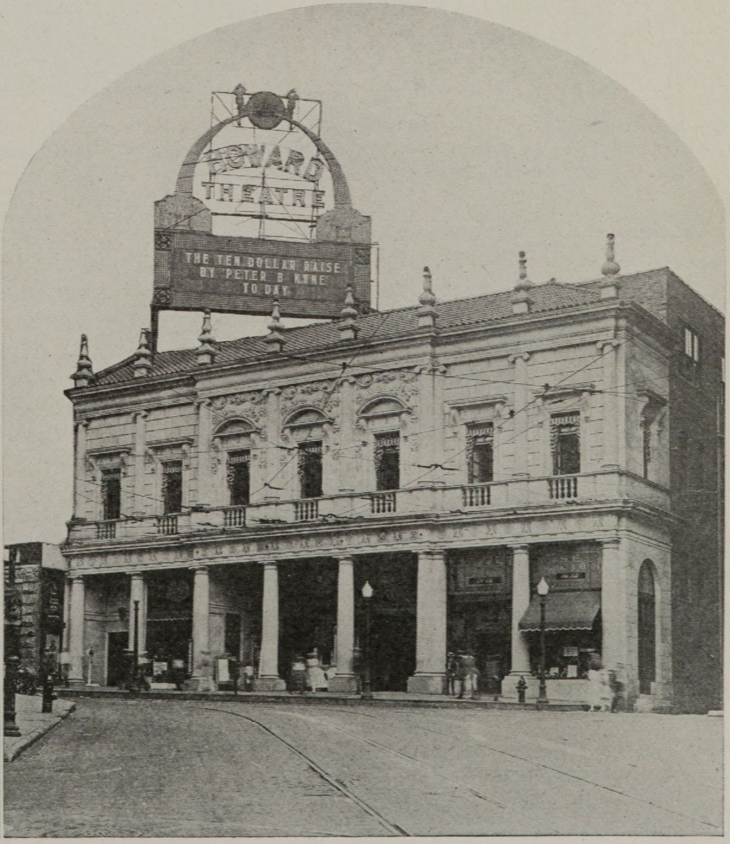
The Howard Theatre in Atlanta showing the film, c. 1924

== Cast ==
- William V. Mong as Wilkins
- Marguerite De La Motte as Dorothy
- Pat O'Malley as Jimmy
- Helen Jerome Eddy as Emily
- Hallam Cooley as Don
- Lincoln Plumer as Bates
- Charles Hill Mailes as Stryker

== Preservation ==
With no holdings located in archives, The Ten Dollar Raise is considered a lost film.

== Bibliography ==
- Taves, Brian. Thomas Ince: Hollywood's Independent Pioneer. University Press of Kentucky, 2012.
