= Sealed Lips (disambiguation) =

Sealed Lips is a 1942 American film.

Sealed Lips may also refer to:

- Sealed Lips (1925 film), an American silent film
- Sealed Lips (1927 film), a Swedish silent film
- Sealed Lips (1942 film), an Italian film directed by Mario Mattoli

== See also ==
- My Lips Are Sealed (disambiguation)
