= Thomas Ince: Hollywood's Independent Pioneer =

2012 biography of Thomas H. Ince by Brian Taves

- Cover page
- Author: Brian Taves
- Language: English
- Series: Screen Classics
- Subject: Thomas H. Ince
- Published: University Press of Kentucky (2012)
- Publication place: United States
- Pages: 384
- ISBN: 978-0-8131-3422-2
- OCLC: 5105140113

Thomas Ince: Hollywood's Independent Pioneer is a biography of Thomas H. Ince, written by Brian Taves and published by University Press of Kentucky in 2012. Upon publication the book was positively reviewed by critics. Divided in 5 parts, the book provides information about Ince's life and his films, including their financial details. Taves rejects the idea that William Randolph Hearst was responsible for Ince's death.

== Background ==
Thomas H. Ince (1880–1924) was a silent film actor, director, screenwriter and producer. He built Inceville, one of the earliest film studios in the United States. He was called the "Father of the Western." Brian Taves was an archivist with the Library of Congress. This is the first biography of Ince. Tave's research work included an analysis of Ince's papers, films and trade journals of the silent era. He also used 13,000 items in the Library of Congress's archive on Ince.

== Summary ==
The book is divided into 5 parts and 17 chapters. The parts have been titled Beginnings, Making a Reputation, Innovations, Paramount and The Perils of an Independent. The first three parts have 2 chapters each while the fourth one has three and the remaining form the last part. Posters of Ince's films, his frequent collaborators and articles about his film making techniques were included in the book. A full chapter-case study of Her Reputation, a film based on yellow journalism, was also included. In the book, Taves rejects the involvement of William Randolph Hearst in Ince's death (as shown in The Cat's Meow). Details about Ince's income, expenditure on his films and their box office collection are also included.

== Reception ==
In The Huffington Post, arts journalist Thomas Gladysz called the book one of the 10 best film books of 2011. Turner Classic Movies featured it as its book of the month in January 2012. Florida Weekly's Larry Cox said that the book was "filled with unexpected surprises". Mindy Aloff wrote in The Washington Post, that "More closely resembling a legal brief than a popular biography, Taves's book is no beach read."
