= Corvette K-225 =

1943 film by Richard Rosson

- 1943 Theatrical poster
- Directed by: Richard Rosson
- Screenplay by: John Rhodes Sturdy (as John Rhodes Sturdy Lieut. R.C.N.V.R.)
- Produced by: Howard Hawks
- Starring: Randolph Scott; James Brown
- Cinematography: Tony Gaudio
- Edited by: Edward Curtiss
- Music by: David Buttolph
- Color process: Black and white
- Production company: Universal Pictures
- Distributed by: Universal Pictures
- Release date: September 29, 1943 (United States)
- Running time: 98 minutes
- Country: United States
- Language: English
- Box office: $1 million (US rentals)

Corvette K-225 is a 1943 American war film starring Randolph Scott and James Brown, with Ella Raines making her feature film debut. Directed by Richard Rosson, the film was released in the UK as The Nelson Touch. Robert Mitchum, credited as Bob Mitchum, had a minor supporting role, one of 20 Hollywood films he made in 1943. Tony Gaudio was nominated for the 1943 Academy Award for Best Cinematography (B&W) for his work on Corvette K -225.

== Plot ==
In 1943 at the height of the Battle of the Atlantic, the Royal Canadian Navy Lieutenant Commander MacClain has just lost his ship and most of his crewmen due to enemy action. While accompanying a convoy, he was attacked by a U-boat with a distinctive large Iron Cross painted on the conning tower. The U-boat surfaced and machine-gunned many of the survivors. Offered duty ashore, MacClain is determined to avenge his men. He is allocated a new ship and while waiting for it to be built befriends Joyce Cartwright, whose brother Dick, an officer, was killed under his command.

MacClain's new Flower-class corvette is christened as HMCS Donnacona, and soon a crew of 65, including officer Paul Cartwright, Joyce's younger brother, is assigned to the ship. Setting out as an escort to a convoy heading for England, the Donnacona comes upon the grisly sight of a lifeboat filled with dead sailors, the result of a deadly U-boat attack.

In an ocean storm, his ship is separated from the convoy, but 300 miles from the Irish coast MacClain finds other lost ships that had also been separated from their escorts. The captain of the tanker Egyptian Star relays the information that he thinks a submarine has been trailing him. The small group of ships then becomes the target of Luftwaffe bombers that are chased off by a Fleet Air Arm Hawker Hurricane fighter launched from one of the escort ships. The submarines below are still the main concern and when the Egyptian Star is torpedoed and sunk, MacClain attacks, sinking a U-boat with depth charges.

Another U-boat surfaces and in a running battle badly damages the Donnacona. The U-boat is damaged by deck gun fire from the corvette. MacClain attempts to ram the submarine and when it begins to dive, depth charges are fired, sinking it. As it breaks up MacClain recognizes it as the one which had machine-gunned his former crew.

The corvette, along with six surviving merchant ships, limps to safety in Ireland. Before it sets anchor MacClain is asked to sail the Donnacona past the other ships in the harbor so that its crew may be saluted for their bravery.

== Cast ==
- Randolph Scott as Lt. Cmdr. McLain
- James Brown as Lt. Paul Cartwright
- Ella Raines as Joyce Cartwright
- Barry Fitzgerald as "Stooky" O'Meara
- Andy Devine as Walsh
- Fuzzy Knight as Cricket
- Noah Beery, Jr. as Stone
- Richard Lane as Admiral
- Thomas Gomez as Smithy
- David Bruce as Rawlins
- Murray Alper as Jones
- James Flavin as [Bill] Gardner
- Walter Sande as Evans

== Production ==
Corvette K-225 was produced under the working title of "Corvettes in Action" between February 4 and early May 1943. While much of the film was made on a sound stage, parts of it, notably an outdoor scene at the University of King's College, Halifax, were filmed in Halifax, Nova Scotia, where many of the corvettes were stationed and where many transatlantic convoys were gathered and deployed. Over a three-month period in 1943 camera crews accompanied five convoys in order to gather background footage.

As its location was a wartime secret, Halifax is referred to as "Hannington Harbour" in the film. The scenes of the shipyard were filmed at Toronto, Ontario; the Maple Leaf Mills grain elevator at the foot of Spadina Avenue is visible in a few scenes. Corvette K -225 featured a fictional ship in the Royal Canadian Navy, HMCS Donnacona, which was played by HMCS Kitchener (K225). HMCS Kitchener served like the fictional Donnacona on Atlantic convoy escort in World War 2. She was decommissioned in 1945 and scrapped in 1949. Incidentally the real HMCS Donnacona is a currently operating RCN Naval Reserve establishment in Montreal where RCN members are trained and after which the fictional ship was named.

Before final casts were announced, Robert Stack, Dick Foran, Diana Barrymore, Evelyn Ankers, Jon Hall, Nigel Bruce and Patric Knowles were considered by Howard Hawks. In the June 11, 1942 issue of The Hollywood Reporter, Robert Rosson was to be the second unit director on the film, shooting 10 days on location in the Atlantic with a convoy, and Hawks was going to direct, as well as produce. Screenwriter Lt. John Rhodes Sturdy, the commanding officer of a Canadian corvette, was also assigned to the film for five weeks as a technical advisor, loaned to the production by Royal Canadian Navy Public Affairs.

The start of the film features Lieutenant Commander MaClain and his survivors from his previous ship on board a V&W class destroyer. The V&W-class were former Royal Navy fleet destroyers which had been transferred from the Royal Navy to the Royal Canadian Navy for escort duty. They were built between 1918 and 1925.

== Reception ==
The world premiere of Corvette K-225 was held on October 19, 1943 at the Central Theatre in Ottawa, Canada, with the proceeds being donated to the Navy League of Canada. Film critic Bosley Crowther reviewed the film for The New York Times, stating, "Randolph Scott gives a beautiful performance ..." but most of the review focused on the drama of the RCN corvettes at sea, "In a virtually documentary treatment of life aboard the K-225, Producer Howard Hawks and Richard Rosson, director of the film, have realized the physical strain and torment of work in a rampant corvette. They have pictured with indubitable fidelity the discomforts of an escort vessel's crew—the eternal tossing and rolling of the ship in a moderate sea; her plunging and gyrating in the grip of a North Atlantic gale, with tons of sea water pouring over her, battering and soaking every man."
