= An Affair of the Follies =

1927 film by Millard Webb

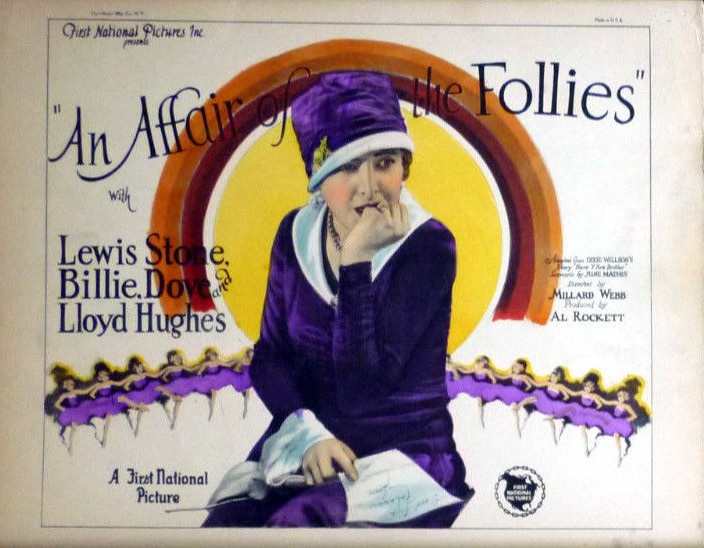
- Lobby card
- Directed by: Millard Webb
- Written by: June Mathis; Carey Wilson
- Based on: Here Y'Are, Brother by Dixie Willson
- Produced by: Al Rocket
- Starring: Billie Dove
- Cinematography: Tony Gaudio
- Edited by: Hugh Bennett
- Distributed by: First National Pictures
- Release date: February 13, 1927
- Running time: 70 minutes
- Country: United States
- Language: Silent (English intertitles)

An Affair of the Follies is a 1927 American silent romantic drama film directed by Millard Webb and distributed by First National Pictures.

== Cast ==
- Lewis Stone as Hammersley
- Billie Dove as Tamara
- Lloyd Hughes as Jerry
- Arthur Stone as Sam the Waiter
- Arthur Hoyt as The Inventor
- Bertram Marburgh as Lew Kline
- Vera Gordon

== Preservation ==
With no prints of An Affair of the Follies located in any film archives, it is a lost film.
