= The Breaking Point (1921 film) =

1921 silent film

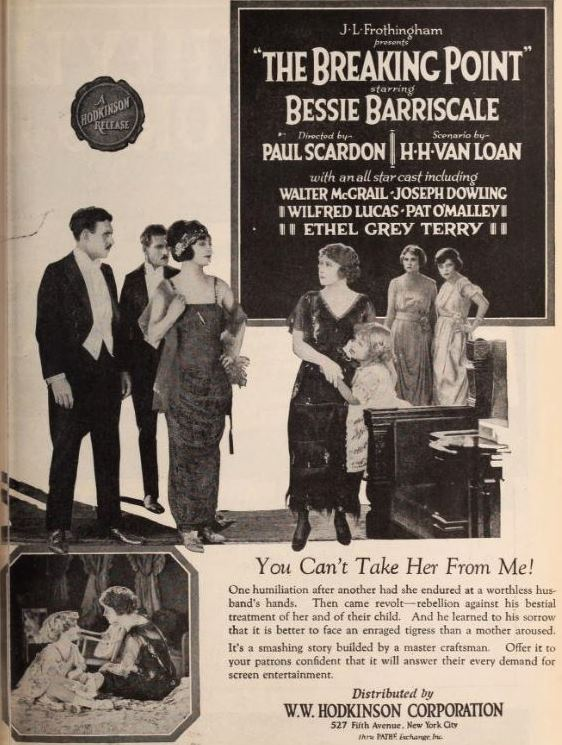
- Directed by: Paul Scardon
- Written by: H. H. Van Loan
- Based on: The Living Child by Mary Lerner
- Produced by: J. L. Frothingham
- Starring: Bessie Barriscale; Walter McGrail; Ethel Grey Terry
- Cinematography: René Guissart
- Production company: J. L. Frothingham Productions
- Distributed by: Hodkinson Pictures
- Release date: February 1921
- Running time: 70 minutes
- Country: United States
- Languages: Silent; English intertitles

The Breaking Point is a 1921 American silent drama film directed by Paul Scardon and starring Bessie Barriscale, Walter McGrail and Ethel Grey Terry.

== Cast ==
- Bessie Barriscale as Ruth Marshall
- Walter McGrail as Richard Janeway
- Ethel Grey Terry as Lucia Deeping
- Eugenie Besserer as Mrs. Janeway
- Pat O'Malley as Phillip Bradley
- Winter Hall as Dr. Hillyer
- Wilfred Lucas as Mortimer Davidson
- Joseph J. Dowling as Mrs. Marshall
- Lydia Knott as Mrs. Marshall
- Irene Yeager as Camilla

== Bibliography ==
- Munden, Kenneth White. The American Film Institute Catalog of Motion Pictures Produced in the United States, Part 1. University of California Press, 1997.
