= The Price of Success (1925 film) =

1925 film

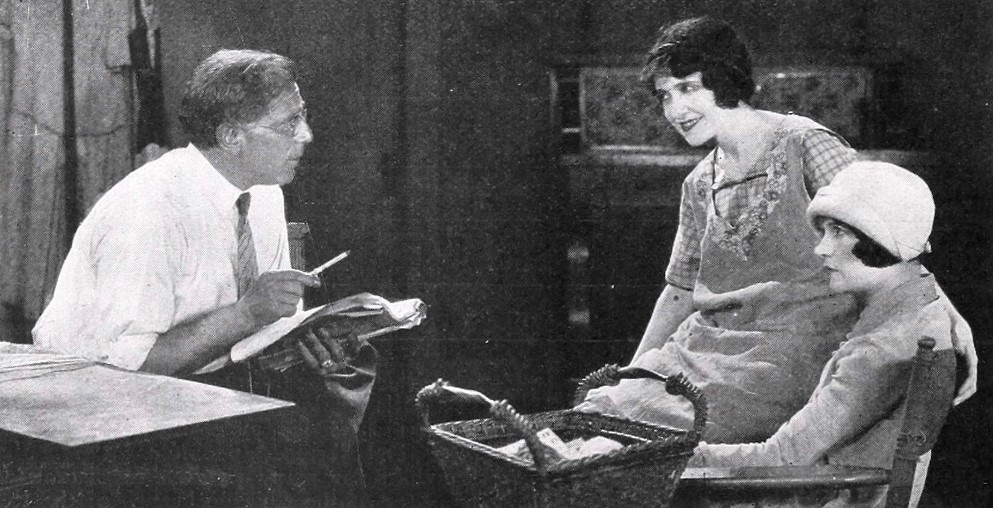
- Director Tony Gaudio, Florence Turner, and Alice Lake
- Directed by: Tony Gaudio
- Written by: Tom J. Hopkins
- Starring: Alice Lake; Lee Shumway; Gaston Glass
- Cinematography: Frank B. Good
- Production company: Waldorf Productions
- Distributed by: Columbia Pictures
- Release date: August 15, 1925
- Running time: 56 minutes
- Country: United States
- Language: Silent (English intertitles)

The Price of Success is a 1925 American silent drama film directed by Tony Gaudio and starring Alice Lake, Lee Shumway, and Gaston Glass.

== Plot ==
As described in a film magazine review, Ellen Harden discovers that her husband George is attracted by the beautiful vamp Ardath Courtney. She invites Ardath to dinner and tells her that she is aware of the intrigue. Ellen rents an apartment for Mrs. Moran, a poor woman ill-used by her drunken husband Jimmy. While she is visiting this flat, Ellen is framed by Ardath, who sends George there to see that his wife has an apartment. The husband's suspicions of Ellen's infidelity are cleared when Jimmy Moran appears, furious at Ellen for befriending and aiding his wife. George thrashes him and is reconciled to Ellen.

== Cast ==
- Alice Lake as Ellen Harden
- Lee Shumway as George Harden
- Gaston Glass as Wally
- Florence Turner as Mrs. Moran
- Spec O'Donnell as Jimmy Moran
- Edward Kipling as Butler
- Alma Bennett as Ardath Courtney
- James Ferley as Bill Moran
- Tom Ricketts as Peter Van Teyne

== Preservation and status ==
A copy of the film survives at the Library of Congress.

== Bibliography ==
- Connelly, Robert B. The Silents: Silent Feature Films, 1910-36, Volume 40, Issue 2. December Press, 1998.
- Munden, Kenneth White. The American Film Institute Catalog of Motion Pictures Produced in the United States, Part 1. University of California Press, 1997.
