= Classmates (1914 film) =

- Directed by: James Kirkwood
- Based on: Classmates by Margaret Turnbull and William C. deMille
- Produced by: Abe Erlanger; Marc Klaw
- Starring: Henry B. Walthall; Blanche Sweet
- Cinematography: Tony Gaudio
- Distributed by: Biograph Company
- Release date: February 14, 1914
- Running time: 4 reels (approximately 40 minutes)
- Language: Silent film (English intertitles)

Classmates is a 1914 silent film directed by James Kirkwood for the Biograph Company. It is based on the 1907 stage play Classmates by Margaret Turnbull and William C. deMille. It was shot in Jacksonville, Florida at the end of 1913.

== Cast ==
- Blanche Sweet as Sylvia Randolph
- Henry B. Walthall as Duncan Irving
- Marshall Neilan as Bert Stafford
- Gertrude Robinson as Phyllis Stafford
- Augusta Anderson as Mrs. Stafford
- Lionel Barrymore as Dumble
- Thomas Jefferson as Mr. Irving
- Dorothy Bernard as Bit (uncredited)
- Jack Mulhall as Man (uncredited)

== Preservation ==
The film is extant today as the result of a paper print in the Library of Congress. It was shown at Cinefest 2012.
