= The Millionaire Policeman =

1926 film

- Directed by: Edward LeSaint
- Written by: Samuel J. Briskin; Dorothy Yost
- Starring: Herbert Rawlinson; Eva Novak; Eugenie Besserer
- Cinematography: Mack Stengler
- Production company: Banner Productions
- Distributed by: Henry Ginsberg Distributing Company; Wardour Films (UK)
- Release date: June 10, 1926
- Running time: 60 minutes
- Country: United States
- Language: Silent (English intertitles)

The Millionaire Policeman is a 1926 American silent drama film directed by Edward LeSaint and starring Herbert Rawlinson, Eva Novak, and Eugenie Besserer.

== Plot ==
As described in a film magazine, Steven Wallace, a young millionaire, shows his cowardice when the horse his female companion is riding runs away and must be rescued by a mounted policeman. Ashamed, he joins the police force in a distant city to learn how to be brave. He falls in love with Mary Gray, the daughter of his landlady Mrs. Gray, and becomes engaged to her. The girl's worthless brother Jimmy, the idol of his mother, breaks open a safe and is arrested by the policeman. Jimmy attempts to escape and overturns a lamp, setting fire to the house, and then falls to his death. Steve rescues both Mary and her mother from the flames. He receives a medal for bravery and marries the young woman.

== Cast ==
- Herbert Rawlinson as Steven Wallace
- Eva Novak as Mary Gray
- Eugenie Besserer as Mrs. Gray
- Arthur Rankin as Jimmy Gray
- Lillian Langdon as Mrs. Wallace

== Preservation ==
With no prints of The Millionaire Policeman located in any film archives, it is a lost film.

== Bibliography ==
- Munden, Kenneth White. The American Film Institute Catalog of Motion Pictures Produced in the United States, Part 1. University of California Press, 1997.
