= Bordertown (1935 film) =

American drama film directed by Archie Mayo

- Theatrical release poster
- Directed by: Archie Mayo
- Screenplay by: Laird Doyle; Wallace Smith
- Story by: Robert Lord
- Based on: Border Town; 1934 novel by Carroll Graham
- Produced by: Jack L. Warner; Hal B. Wallis
- Starring: Paul Muni; Bette Davis
- Cinematography: Tony Gaudio
- Edited by: Thomas Richards
- Music by: Bernhard Kaun
- Distributed by: Warner Bros. Pictures, Inc.
- Release date: January 23, 1935
- Running time: 90 minutes
- Country: United States
- Language: English
- Budget: $369,000
- Box office: $1,237,000

Bordertown is a 1935 American drama film directed by Archie Mayo and starring Paul Muni and Bette Davis. The screenplay by Laird Doyle and Wallace Smith is based on Robert Lord's adaptation of the 1934 novel Border Town by Carroll Graham. The supporting cast features Margaret Lindsay, Eugene Pallette and Robert Barrat. Although the films They Drive by Night (1940) and Blowing Wild (1953) are not specifically remakes of Bordertown, they include many of its plot elements and similar scenes.

== Plot ==
After graduating from Pacific Night Law School in Los Angeles, feisty and ambitious Mexican American Johnny Ramirez loses his first court case because he is ill-prepared. His poor, Hispanic client's truck was destroyed by careless debutante Dale Elwell. Johnny is harassed by the opposing attorney, uppercrust Brook Manville, who is defending his lover, Elwell. Johnny reacts, losing his temper and the case. Disbarred for his actions, he journeys to a small town south of the border and finds work as a bouncer, in a seedy casino owned by Charlie Roark. Johnny helps transform the dive into a first-class nightclub called the Silver Slipper that attracts an upscale crowd, and Charlie makes him a partner to reward him for his efforts.

Charlie's lonely, unhappily married wife Marie makes a play for Johnny, who resists her advances. Certain Johnny has shunned her simply because she is married, she locks her inebriated husband in the garage and leaves the car running, asphyxiating him.

Dale Elwell and her society friends, including Brook Manville, visit the club and Johnny becomes infatuated with her. A jealous Marie accuses Johnny of murdering Charlie, but when called to testify at his trial, she collapses on the witness stand, having become insane. Johnny returns to Los Angeles and proposes to Dale, who contemptuously rejects him, citing the dramatic differences in their ethnic and economic backgrounds, then is hit and killed by a car when trying to get away from him. Johnny decides to sell the Silver Slipper, donate the proceeds to a law school, and settle in Los Angeles among his own people.

== Cast ==
- Paul Muni as Johnny Ramirez
- Bette Davis as Marie Roark
- Margaret Lindsay as Dale Elwell
- Eugene Pallette as Charlie Roark
- Robert Barrat as Padre
- Soledad Jimenez as Mrs. Ramirez
- Hobart Cavanaugh as Harry
- Gavin Gordon as Brook Manville
- William Davidson as Dr. Carte
- Oscar Apfel as Judge Rufus Barnswell (uncredited)
- Wade Boteler as Buying Casino Man (uncredited)
- Chris-Pin Martin as José (uncredited)
- George Regas as Guillermo (uncredited)
- Arthur Treacher as Roberts (uncredited)

== Production ==
Bordertown was one of the first films to come under the close scrutiny of the Hays Office, which finally was enforcing the Motion Picture Production Code introduced in 1930 to limit content seen as controversial or salacious. In the original script, Johnny Ramirez was disbarred for committing murder and had an affair with Marie Roark, two plot elements that had to be revised before the screenplay was approved.

Leading man Paul Muni wanted either Carole Lombard or Lupe Vélez as his co-star, but after hearing the positive feedback his contract player Bette Davis was receiving for her performance in Of Human Bondage, which was in production at RKO, studio head Jack L. Warner decided to cast her in the role of Marie Roark. "The part of Marie was an excellent acting part - a step in the direction of where I wanted my career to go", Davis later recalled. "I wanted to be known as an actress, not necessarily a star, although that would be the frosting on the cake if it should ever come about."

After murdering her husband, Marie undergoes a gradual mental deterioration, culminating in a collapse in the courtroom. Director Archie Mayo expected Davis to deliver a histrionic performance, but the actress, whose own sister suffered from a mental disorder, insisted a subtle portrayal of the breakdown was more appropriate and accurate. "When I firmly and sincerely believed I should play my role a certain way, I wasn't afraid to argue about it with my director", Davis remembered. "They wanted me to be a raving lunatic in the courtroom scene, pull my hair, and scream. That is the only way insanity had been played on the screen up to that time." After the film was completed, studio executives felt viewers would fail to realize Marie was insane and insisted Davis re-shoot the scene. She agreed she would do so only if preview audiences did not realize the character had descended into madness. "I was never asked to do a retake", Davis recalled.

== Critical reception ==
Andre Sennwald of The New York Times called the film "a raw and biting melodrama dealing with the bitterly realistic emotions" that permits Paul Muni "to scrape the nerves in the kind of taut and snarling role at which he is so consummately satisfying" and to display "his great talent for conviction and theatrical honesty." He cited the "fine and uncommonly honest performance" of Bette Davis, who he found to be "effective and touching in pathological mazes which the cinema rarely dares to examine." While he thought Johnny's "feeble confessional at the conclusion of Bordertown is an unconvincing and inconsistent denouement for the career of such a vigorous rebel against the established order", he felt the film "otherwise manages to impale the spectator's attention before the picturesque and somewhat hysterical materials of the story."

== Box Office ==
According to Warner Bros records the film earned $891,000 domestically and $346,000 foreign.
