= Shattered Idols =

1922 film

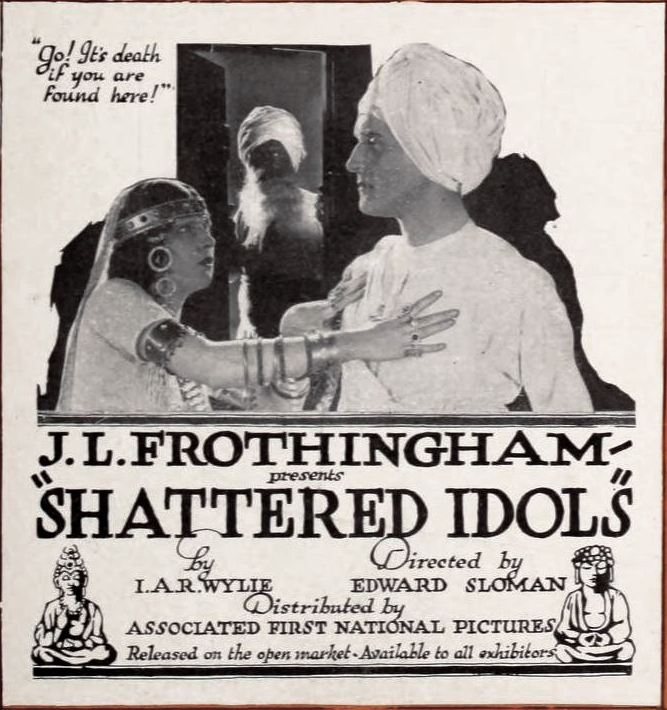
- Advertisement
- Directed by: Edward Sloman
- Screenplay by: William V. Mong
- Based on: The Daughter of Brahma by I. A. R. Wylie
- Produced by: J. L. Frothingham
- Starring: Marguerite De La Motte; William V. Mong; James W. Morrison; Frankie Lee; Ethel Grey Terry; Alfred Allen
- Cinematography: Tony Gaudio
- Production company: J. L. Frothingham Productions
- Distributed by: Associated First National Pictures
- Release date: February 6, 1922
- Running time: 60 minutes
- Country: United States
- Language: Silent (English intertitles)

Shattered Idols is a 1922 American drama film directed by Edward Sloman and written by William V. Mong. It is based on the 1912 novel The Daughter of Brahma by I. A. R. Wylie. The film stars Marguerite De La Motte, William V. Mong, James W. Morrison, Frankie Lee, Ethel Grey Terry, and Alfred Allen. The film was released on February 6, 1922, by Associated First National Pictures. A print of Shattered Idols exists in the film holdings of FPA France (Lobster Films collection).

== Plot ==
As described in a film magazine, Jean Hurst, a British army officer's wife in India, on the eve of the birth of her child, finds her husband dead, murdered on their doorstep. The child is born a cripple, and is a weakling and coward. Grown to manhood, because of his mother's hatred, David denounces the association of white people in the colony and marries Sarasvati, the goddess of a tribe that plans to overthrow their English rulers. Inheriting an estate and title in England, his mother hopes he will divorce his wife and marry the daughter of an army officer, but he remains steadfast. Learning of the sudden uprising of the native people, he risks his life to warn the British soldiers. When he returns to his bride, he finds that she has sacrificed her life for his.

== Cast ==
- Marguerite De La Motte as Sarasvati
- William V. Mong as Rama Pal
- James W. Morrison as Lt. Walter Hurst/David Hurst
- Frankie Lee as David Hurst
- Ethel Grey Terry as Jean Hurst
- Alfred Allen as The Judge
- Louise Lovely as Diana Chichester
- Harvey Clark as Col. Chichester
- Josephine Crowell as Mrs. Chichester
- Robert Littlefield as Dick Hathaway
- Mary Wynn as Ethel Hathaway
- George Periolat as The High Priest
- Tom Ricketts as Rev. Dr. Romney
