= J. L. Frothingham =

American independent film producer

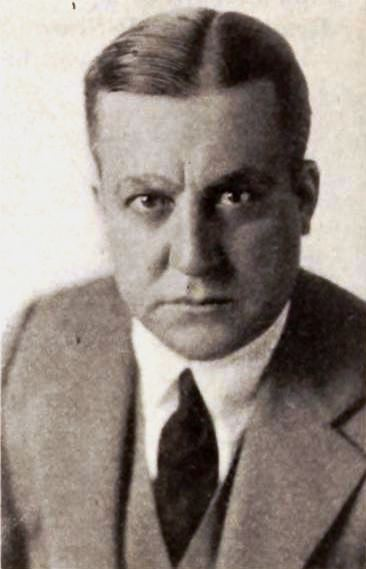
- Born: Joseph Laforme Frothingham; February 6, 1880; Boston, Massachusetts, US
- Died: October 31, 1925 (aged 45); San Diego, California, US
- Education: Harvard University
- Spouses: Ethel Morrison (divorced) Marcia Manon (divorced): Elizabeth Kathan

Joseph Laforme Frothingham (1880-1912) was an American independent film producer, talent manager, and studio manager who was active in Hollywood during the silent era. He also judged dog shows.

== Biography ==
=== Career ===
In the early 1920s, he joined forces with names like King Vidor, Allan Dwan, and Mack Sennett to form a group called the Associated Producers.

Although his credits are all as producer, he was attached for a time to direct the 1923 film Vengeance of the Deep, a project that was ultimately credited to Barry Barringer. He also managed the career of frequent collaborator Bessie Barriscale for a time, along with Barbara La Marr.

=== Personal life ===
Frothingham married actress Marcia Manon in 1919.

He became the legal guardian of teen actress Marguerite De La Motte and her brother when their parents died.

He died in San Diego on Halloween of 1925 while judging a dog show.

== Selected filmography ==
- Shattered Idols (1922)
- The Ten Dollar Raise (1921)
- Pilgrims of the Night (1921)
- The Breaking Point (1921)
