= Eugenie Besserer =

American actress (1868–1934)

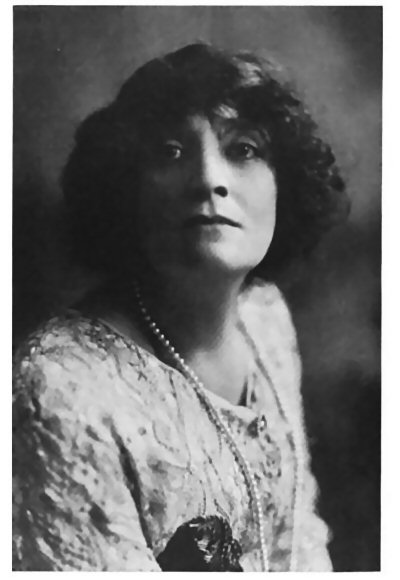
- Besserer in 1914
- Born: December 25, 1868; Marseille, France
- Died: May 28, 1934 (aged 65); Los Angeles, California, U.S.
- Resting place: Calvary Cemetery, East Los Angeles, California, U.S.
- Occupation: Actress
- Years active: 1910–1933
- Spouse: Albert W. Hegger (m. 1885)

Eugenie Besserer (December 25, 1868 – May 28, 1934) was a French-American actress who starred in silent films and features of the early sound motion-picture era, beginning in 1910. Her most prominent role is that of the title character's mother in the first talkie film, The Jazz Singer.

== Early life ==
Born in Marseilles, France, Besserer attended the Convent of Notre Dame in Ottawa, Ontario. She was taken by her parents to Ottawa as a girl, and spent her childhood there. She was left an orphan and escaped from her guardians at the age of 12. She came to New York City and arrived at Grand Central Station with only 25 cents (Canadian currency, equivalent to US$0.34 at the time) in her pocket. With the assistance of a street car conductor, Besserer managed to locate a former governess, who, in turn, helped locate the uncle with whom she ultimately took up residence. There, Besserer continued her education, gaining some proficiency in athletics, and in fencing in particular—so much so that she was gratified to find herself holding her own against noted stage swashbuckler Alexander Salvini.

== Career ==
Besserer's initial theatrical experience came with McKee Rankin when the producer had Nance O'Neill as a star. Soon, she appeared with notable stage actors including Frank Keenan and Wilton Lackaye. As a youth, she played a juvenile part with Maurice Barrymore. She performed a season at Pike's Opera House in Portland, Oregon. Another season, Besserer acted in a drama opposite Henry Kolker. The illness of her sister brought her to the West Coast, and she came to Hollywood in 1910 when films were just starting to be made there.

In motion pictures, Eugenie was usually cast in mother roles, including as the mother of Al Jolson's character in The Jazz Singer. Besserer became associated with the Selig Polyscope Company. She portrayed Aunt Ray Innis in The Circular Staircase (1915), based on the novel by Mary Roberts Rinehart.

== Personal life ==
Besserer married art dealer Albert W. Hegger. They had one daughter.

== Death ==
On May 29, 1934, Besserer died at her Hollywood home, aged 64. A funeral mass was held at St. Theresa's Church, with a rosary service at Edwards Brothers Colonial Mortuary, Venice Boulevard, in Los Angeles. She is buried in Calvary Cemetery, East Los Angeles.

== Selected filmography ==
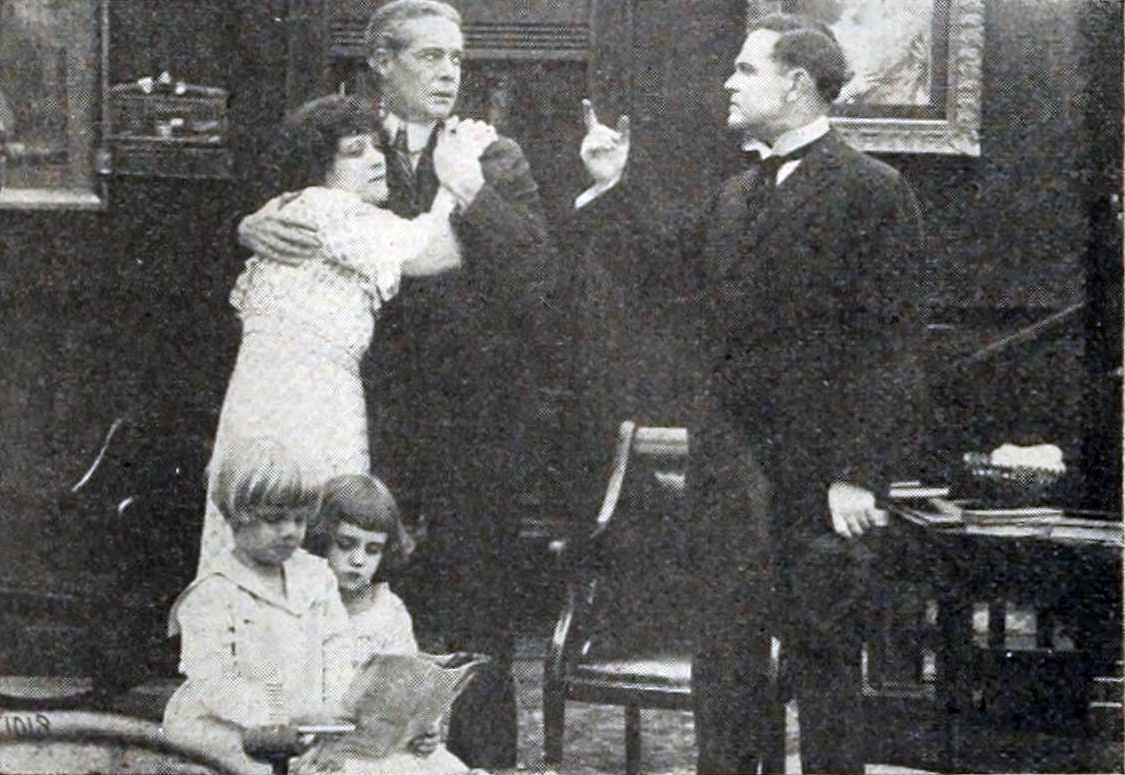
The Sacrifice (1916)

=== 1910s ===
- The Wonderful Wizard of Oz (1910, Short) as Aunt Em
- The Mother (1911, Short) as The Governor's Daughter
- The Still Alarm (1911, Short) as Elinor Fordham
- Stability vs. Nobility (1911, Short) as Bradley's 1st Daughter
- One of Nature's Noblemen (1911, Short) as Minnie Brown
- A Sacrifice to Civilization (1911, Short)
- The Craven Heart (1911, Short) as Madame Dantes
- It Happened in the West (1911, Short) as Prologue
- The Profligate (1911, Short) as Pauline Revere - the Wronged Wife
- Slick's Romance (1911, Short)
- Their Only Son (1911, Short)
- The Regeneration of Apache Kid (1911, Short) as Mrs. Dudley
- The Blacksmith's Love (1911, Short) as Mary Brewer Saunders
- Old Billy (1911, Short) as Mrs. Marming - the Widow
- The Bootlegger (1911, Short) as Mrs. Fancher
- An Evil Power (1911, Short) as Madame Celeste
- George Warrington's Escape (1911, Short) as Madame Esmond Warrington
- The Cowboy's Adopted Child (1912, Short) as Sarah Fowler
- The Other Fellow (1911, Short) as Mrs. Brown
- Bunkie (1912, Short) as Miss Ford - Brooks' Bethrothed
- Disillusioned (1912, Short) as Miss Gary
- The Danites (1912, Short) as The Widowed Schoolteacher
- As Told by Princess Bess (1912, Short) as Princess Bess (old)
- The Junior Officer (1912, Short) as Ethel Temple - the Count's Wife
- Me an' Bill (1912, Short) as Kitty Somners
- The End of the Romance (1912, Short) as Alice Gray
- The Hand of Fate (1912, Short) as Mrs. VanDuzen
- A Child of the Wilderness (1912, Short) as Tonoma - Joe's Protector
- In Exile (1912, Short) as Countess Romanoff
- The Lake of Dreams (1912, Short) as Madge Andrews
- His Masterpiece (1912, Short) as The Prima Donna
- The Little Indian Martyr (1912, Short) as Chiquito's Mother
- Sergeant Byrne of the Northwest Mounted Police (1912, Short) as Jessie Long
- The Indelible Stain (1912, Short) as Marla
- The Substitute Model (1912, Short) as Millicent Carr - the Substitute Model
- Monte Cristo (1912, Short) as Mercedes
- His Wedding Eve (1912, Short) as Mrs. Ellis - Tom's Mother
- Old Songs and Memories (1912, Short) as Nellie Laurence - the Old Lady
- The Vintage of Fate (1912, Short) as Minor Role (uncredited)
- Opitsah: Apache for Sweetheart (1912, Short) as Mrs. McGuire - Jim's Mother
- The Millionaire Vagabonds (1912, Short) as Mrs. Knobhill
- Sammy Orpheus; or, The Pied Piper of the Jungle (1912, Short) as Kate
- The Last of Her Tribe (1912, Short) as Neepah - Moquin's Squaw
- The Governor's Daughter (1913, Short) as Mrs. Carey - Jim's Mother
- The Spanish Parrot Girl (1913, Short) as Mrs. Avery
- Diverging Paths (1913, Short) as Lily and Rose's Mother
- Love Before Ten (1913, Short) as Mrs. Walters
- Dollar Down, Dollar a Week (1913, Short) as Mrs. Sanger - the Aunt
- In the Days of Witchcraft (1913, Short) as Lady Beresford
- Lieutenant Jones (1913, Short) as Mrs. Cartright
- Indian Summer (1913, Short) as Virginia
- Wamba A Child of the Jungle (1913, Short) as Mrs. Rice
- The Girl and the Judge (1913, Short) as Mrs. Goff - the Judge's Wife
- A Flag of Two Wars (1913, Short) as Mrs. John Reed
- Woman: Past and Present (1913, Short) as Grandmother America
- The Fighting Lieutenant (1913, Short) as The Countess
- In God We Trust (1913, Short) as Bill's Wife
- The Ne'er to Return Road (1913, Short) as Mrs. Hansen - Chris' Mother
- The Unseen Defense (1913, Short) as Minerva Wingood
- The Acid Test (1913, Short) as Mrs. Argonet
- Fate Fashions a Letter (1913, Short) as Mrs. Rand
- The Probationer (1913, Short) as Granny
- Phantoms (1913, Short) as Natalie Storm
- The Master of the Garden (1913, Short) as Mrs. Harrington - Bessie's Mother
- Memories (1914) as Mary, Professor Scott's sweetheart
- Elizabeth's Prayer (1914, Short) as Hilda Crosby, an unscrupulous actress
- The Salvation of Nance O'Shaughnessy (1914, Short) as Mame Ryan
- The Fire Jugglers (1914, Short) as Mrs. Leavitt
- Me an' Bill (1914, Short) as Kitty
- His Fight (1914, Short) as Mrs. Brant
- The Man in Black (1914, Short)
- Ye Vengeful Vagabonds (1914, Short) as Betsy Spratt - Peggy's Mother
- Hearts and Masks (1914, Short) as Mrs. Hyphen-Bonds
- The Tragedy That Lived (1914, Short) as Mary's Grandmother
- The Story of the Blood Red Rose (1914, Short) as Queen of Urania
- The Vision of the Shepherd (1915, Short) as Maggie Hunt
- Poetic Justice of Omar Khan (1915, Short) as Neva Hyde
- The Carpet from Bagdad (1915) as Mrs. Chedsoye
- Ingratitude of Liz Taylor (1915, Short)
- The Rosary (1915) as Widow Kelly
- The Circular Staircase (1915) as Aunt Ray
- The Bridge of Time (1915, Short)
- Just as I Am (1915, Short)
- I'm Glad My Boy Grew Up to Be a Soldier (1915) as Mrs. Warrington
- The Devil-in-Chief (1916, Short) as Johann's Mistress
- Thou Shalt Not Covet (1916) as my wife
- The Grinning Skull (1916, Short) as Mme. Ward Howe
- A Social Deception (1916, Short) as Grace Elliott
- The Woman Who Did Not Care (1916, Short) as Mrs. Boyd
- The Temptation of Adam (1916, Short) as Dorothy Blaine
- The Crisis (1916) as Mrs. Brice
- Twisted Trails (1916, Short) as Martha, the housekeeper
- The Garden of Allah (1916) as Lady Rens
- Beware of Strangers (1917) as Mary DeLacy
- Little Lost Sister (1917) as Mrs. Welcome
- Her Salvation (1917, Short) as Mame Ryan
- The Witness for the State (1917, Short)
- The Curse of Eve (1917) as the Mother
- Who Shall Take My Life? (1917) as Mrs. Munroe
- In After Years (1917, Short)
- The City of Purple Dreams (1918)
- The Still Alarm (1918) as Minor Role
- A Hoosier Romance (1918) as the squire's wife
- The Eyes of Julia Deep (1918) as Mrs. Lowe
- The Road Through the Dark (1918) as Aunt Julie
- The Sea Flower (1918) as Kealani
- Little Orphant Annie (1918) as Mrs. Goode
- Ravished Armenia (1919)
- Turning the Tables (1919) as Mrs. Feverill
- Scarlet Days (1919) as Rosie Nell
- The Greatest Question (1919) as Mrs. Hilton

=== 1920s ===
- The Fighting Shepherdess (1920) as Jezebel
- The Gift Supreme (1920) as Martha Vinton
- For the Soul of Rafael (1920) as Dona Luisa
- The Brand of Lopez (1920) as Señora Castillo
- Fickle Women (1920) as Mrs. Price
- Seeds of Vengeance (1920) as Judith Cree
- 45 Minutes from Broadway (1920) as Mrs. David Dean
- The Scoffer (1920) as Boorman's wife
- What Happened to Rosa (1920) as Madame O'Donnelly
- The Breaking Point (1921) as Mrs. Janeway
- Good Women (1921) as Mrs. Emmeline Shelby
- The Sin of Martha Queed (1921) as Alicia Queed
- The Light in the Clearing (1921) as Roving Kate
- Molly O' (1921) as Antonia Bacigalupi
- The Rosary (1922) as Widow Kathleen Wilson
- Penrod (1922)
- Kindred of the Dust (1922) as Mrs. McKaye
- The Hands of Nara (1922) as Mrs. Claveloux
- June Madness (1922) as Mrs. Whitmore
- The Strangers' Banquet (1922) as Mrs. McPherson
- The Lonely Road (1923) as Martha True
- Her Reputation (1923) as Madame Cervanez
- The Rendezvous (1923) as Nini
- Anna Christie (1923) as Marthy
- Enemies of Children (1923) as Mrs. Slavin
- Bread (1924) as Mrs. Sturgis
- The Price She Paid (1924) as Mrs. Elton Gower
- A Fool and His Money (1925) as Mother
- Friendly Enemies (1925) as Marie
- Confessions of a Queen (1925) as Elanora
- The Coast of Folly (1925) as nanny
- The Circle (1925) as Lady Catherine "Kitty" Cheney
- Wandering Footsteps (1925) as Elizabeth Stuyvesant Whitney
- Bright Lights (1925) as Patsy's mother
- The Skyrocket (1926) as wardrobe mistress
- Kiki (1926) as landlady (uncredited)
- Winning the Futurity (1926) as Mary Allen
- The Millionaire Policeman (1926) as Mrs. Gray
- The Fire Brigade (1926) as Mrs. O'Neil
- Flesh and the Devil (1926) as Leo's mother
- Wandering Girls (1927) as Peggy's mother
- The Night of Love (1927) as gypsy (uncredited)
- When a Man Loves (1927) as the landlady (uncredited)
- Captain Salvation (1927) as Mrs. Buxom
- Slightly Used (1927) as Aunt Lydia
- The Jazz Singer (1927) as Sara Rabinowitz
- Drums of Love (1928) as Duchess de Alvia
- Two Lovers (1928) as Madame Van Rycke
- Yellow Lily (1928) as Archduchess
- Lilac Time (1928) as Madame Berthelot
- A Lady of Chance (1928) as Mrs. 'Ma' Crandall
- The Bridge of San Luis Rey (1929) as a nun
- Thunderbolt (1929) as Mrs. Morgan
- Madame X (1929) as Rose, Floriot's servant
- Whispering Winds (1929) as Jim's mother
- Speedway (1929) as Mrs. MacDonald
- Fast Company (1929) as Mrs. Kane
- Illusion (1929) as Mrs. Jacob Schmittlap
- Mister Antonio (1929) as Mrs. Jorny
- Seven Faces (1929) as Madame Vallon

=== 1930s ===
- A Royal Romance (1930) as Mother
- In Gay Madrid (1930) as Doña Generosa (as Eugenia Besserer)
- Du Barry, Woman of Passion (1930) as Rosalie / prison matron (uncredited)
- Scarface (1932) as citizens committee member (uncredited)
- Six Hours to Live (1932) as The Marquisa (uncredited)
- To the Last Man (1933) as Granny Spelvin (final film role)
