= The Sin of Martha Queed =

1921 film by Allan Dwan

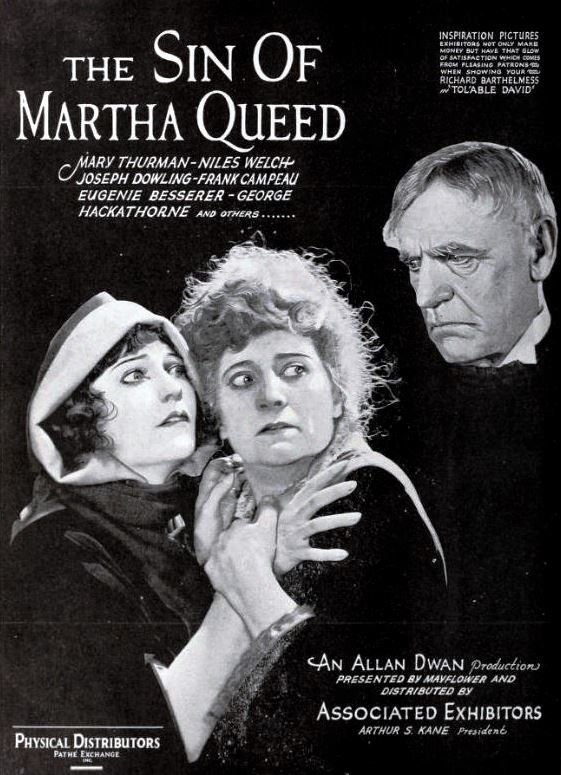
- Directed by: Allan Dwan
- Written by: Allan Dwan
- Starring: Mary Thurman; Joseph J. Dowling; Eugenie Besserer
- Cinematography: Tony Gaudio
- Production company: Mayflower Photoplay Company
- Distributed by: Associated Exhibitors
- Release date: October 6, 1921
- Running time: 60 minutes
- Country: United States
- Languages: Silent; English intertitles

The Sin of Martha Queed is a 1921 American silent drama film directed by Allan Dwan and starring Mary Thurman, Joseph J. Dowling and Eugenie Besserer.

== Cast ==
- Mary Thurman as Martha Queed
- Joseph J. Dowling as Marvin Queed
- Eugenie Besserer as Alicia Queed
- Frankie Lee as Georgie Queed
- Niles Welch as Arnold Barry
- George Hackathorne as Atlas
- Frank Campeau as David Boyd
- Gertrude Claire as Grandmother

== Bibliography ==
- Frederic Lombardi. Allan Dwan and the Rise and Decline of the Hollywood Studios. McFarland, 2013.
