= My Lips Are Sealed =

My Lips Are Sealed may refer to:

- "My Lips Are Sealed", a 1956 song by Jim Reeves
- "My Lips Are Sealed" (Scrubs), an episode of the television show Scrubs

== See also ==
- "Our Lips Are Sealed", a 1981 song by the Go-Go's
- Our Lips Are Sealed (film), a 2000 direct-to-video film
- Sealed Lips (disambiguation)
