= Her Reputation (1923 film) =

1923 film

- Directed by: John Griffith Wray
- Written by: Bradley King
- Based on: novel Her Reputation by Talbot Mundy and Bradley King
- Produced by: Thomas H. Ince
- Starring: May McAvoy; Lloyd Hughes
- Distributed by: Associated First National
- Release date: September 1923
- Running time: 7 reels
- Country: United States
- Languages: Silent; English intertitles

Her Reputation is a 1923 silent film drama directed by John Griffith Wray and starring May McAvoy. It was produced by Thomas H. Ince and released through Associated First National.

== Cast ==
- May McAvoy as Jacqueline Lanier
- Lloyd Hughes as Sherwood Mansfield
- James Corrigan as 'Dad' Lawrence
- Casson Ferguson as Jack Calhoun
- Eric Mayne as Done Andres Miro
- Winter Hall as John Mansfield
- Louise Lester as Consuelo
- Brinsley Shaw as Clinton Kent
- George Larkin as Ramon Cervanez
- Eugenie Besserer as Madame Cervanez
- Jane Miller as Pepita
- Gus Leonard as Rodriguez
- Eugene Jackson as Boy pushed into pond
- Jane Walsh as Little Girl

== Preservation status ==
- The film is now mostly lost, with only the third reel held by the Library of Congress.
