= Pilgrims of the Night =

1921 film by Edward Sloman

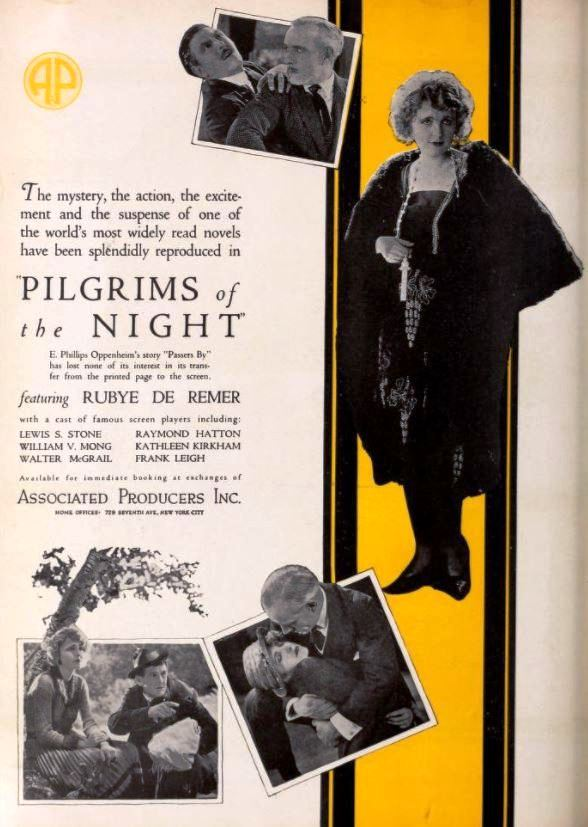
- Directed by: Edward Sloman
- Written by: E. Phillips Oppenheim (novel); Edward Sloman
- Starring: Lewis Stone; Rubye De Remer; William V. Mong
- Cinematography: Tony Gaudio
- Production company: J. L. Frothingham Productions
- Distributed by: Associated Producers
- Release date: September 26, 1921
- Running time: 60 minutes
- Country: United States
- Languages: Silent; English intertitles

Pilgrims of the Night is a 1921 American drama film directed by Edward Sloman and starring Lewis Stone, Rubye De Remer and William V. Mong. It is based on the 1910 novel Passers-By by the British writer E. Phillips Oppenheim.

== Plot ==
After serving a prison term to protect his wife, an English aristocrat goes into exile in Paris where he becomes involved with a shady gambling organisation.

== Cast ==
- Lewis Stone as Philip Champion / Lord Ellingham
- Rubye De Remer as Christine
- William V. Mong as Ambrose
- Kathleen Kirkham as Lady Ellingham
- Raymond Hatton as Le Blun
- Walter McGrail as Gilbert Hannaway
- Frank Leigh as Marcel

== Bibliography ==
- Goble, Alan. The Complete Index to Literary Sources in Film. Walter de Gruyter, 1999.
