= Edward Sloman =

British actor and film director

- Born: July 19, 1883; London, England
- Died: September 29, 1972 (aged 89); Woodland Hills, California, U.S.
- Occupations: Actor; broadcaster; film director; screenwriter

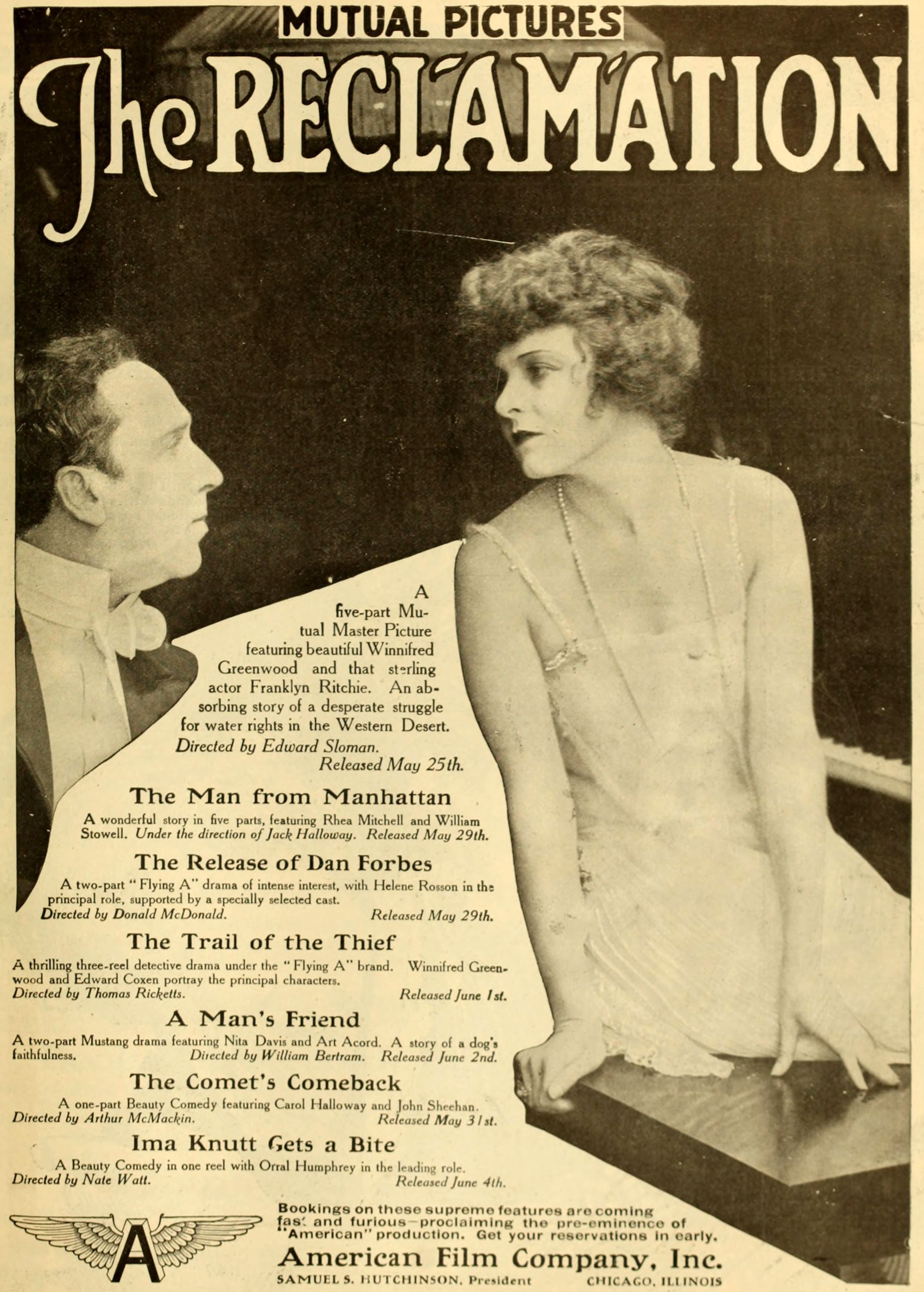
The Reclamation (1916)

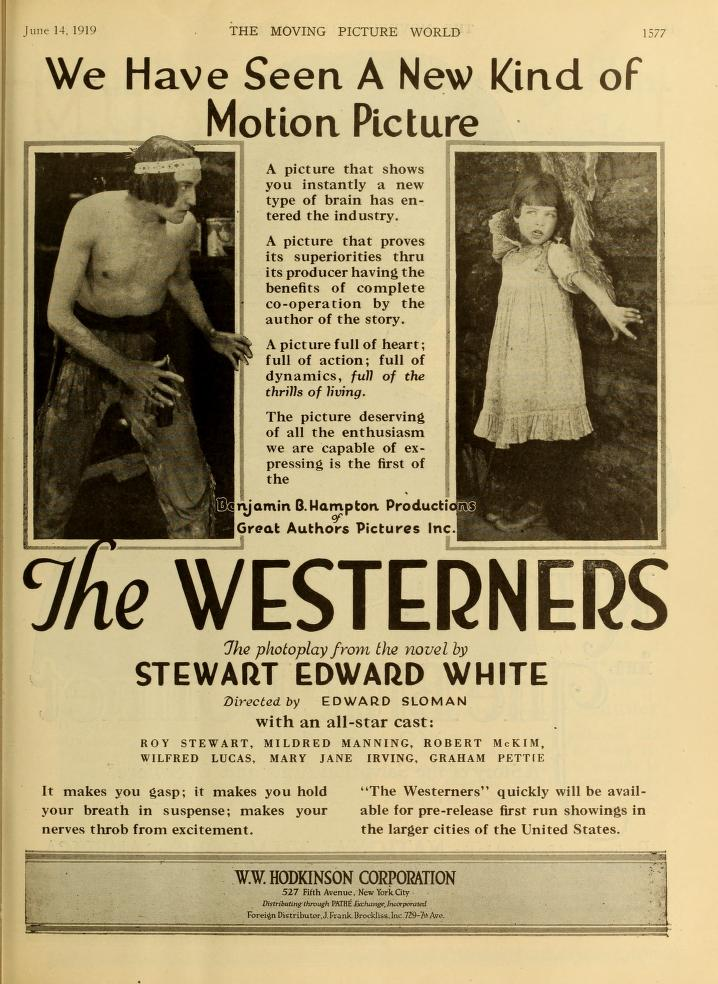
The Westerners (1919)

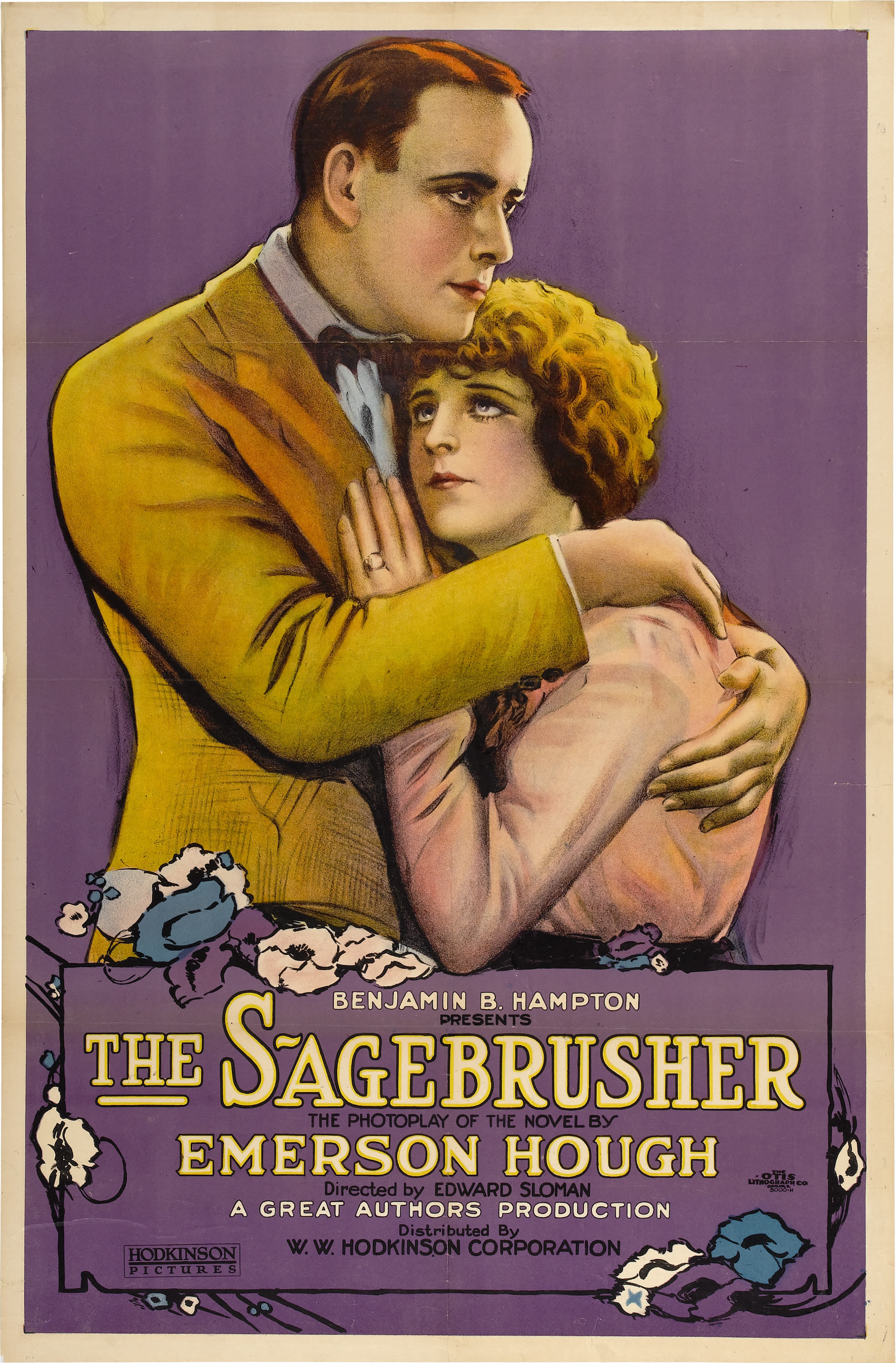
The Sagebrusher (1920)

Edward Sloman (19 July 1883, London - 29 September 1972, Woodland Hills, California) was an English silent film director, actor, screenwriter and radio broadcaster. He directed over 100 films and starred in over 30 films as an actor between 1913 and 1938.

== Post-cinema work ==
After directing over 100 films and starring in over 30, Sloman made his last film in 1938 and in 1939 left the film industry to enter radio broadcasting as a writer, producer and director.

Unfortunately the majority of Sloman's works have been lost. However, his 1927 Universal silent Alias the Deacon starring Jean Hersholt is held by the Library of Congress.

He died in Woodland Hills, California in 1972 aged 89.

== Partial filmography ==
- The Severed Hand (1914)
- The Gulf Between (1916 film)
- The Sequel to the Diamond from the Sky (1916)
- The Twinkler (1916)
- New York Luck (1917)
- The Sea Master (1917)
- A Bit of Jade (1918)
- Social Briars (1918)
- The Ghost of Rosy Taylor (1918)
- Fair Enough (1918)
- Molly of the Follies (1919)
- The Westerners (1919)
- The Luck of Geraldine Laird (1920)
- Blind Youth (1920)
- The Sagebrusher (1920)
- The Mutiny of the Elsinore (1920)
- Burning Daylight (1920)
- The Ten Dollar Raise (1921)
- Pilgrims of the Night (1921)
- The Other Woman (1921)
- Shattered Idols (1922)
- The Woman He Loved (1922)
- Backbone (1923)
- The Eagle's Feather (1923)
- The Last Hour (1923)
- The Price of Pleasure (1925)
- His People (1925)
- The Beautiful Cheat (1926)
- Butterflies in the Rain (1926)
- The Old Soak (1926)
- Surrender (1927)
- Alias the Deacon (1928)
- The Foreign Legion (1928)
- We Americans (1928)
- Girl on the Barge (1929)
- The Lost Zeppelin (1929)
- The Kibitzer (1930)
- Hell's Island (1930)
- Puttin' On the Ritz (1930)
- Soldiers and Women (1930)
- The Last Hour (1930)
- The Conquering Horde (1931)
- Gun Smoke (1931)
- Murder by the Clock (1931)
- Caught (1931)
- His Woman (1931)
- Wayward (1932)
- There's Always Tomorrow (1934)
- A Dog of Flanders (1935)
- The Perfect Tribute (1935)
- The Jury's Secret (1938)
