= Sealed Lips (1925 film) =

1925 film

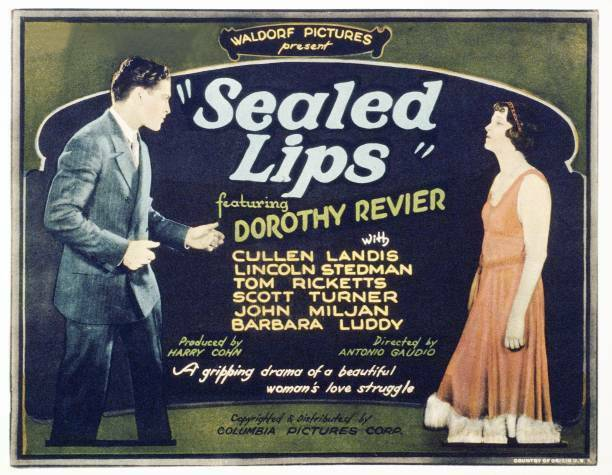
- Lobby card
- Directed by: Tony Gaudio
- Written by: Harold Shumate
- Starring: Dorothy Revier; Cullen Landis; Lincoln Stedman
- Cinematography: Sam Landers
- Production company: Waldorf Productions
- Distributed by: Columbia Pictures
- Release date: September 15, 1925
- Running time: 56 minutes
- Country: United States
- Language: Silent (English intertitles)

Sealed Lips is a lost 1925 American silent drama film directed by Tony Gaudio and starring Dorothy Revier, Cullen Landis, and Lincoln Stedman.

== Plot ==
As described in a film magazine review, a young man who believes his fiancé's dying father, a gambler, is his rival, breaks with the young woman. She tries to prove her innocence, but is not united with the young man until after she saves his sister from a villainous wooer.

== Cast ==
- Dorothy Revier as Margaret Blake
- Cullen Landis as Alan Howard
- Lincoln Stedman as Jack Warren
- Scott Turner as James Blake
- John Miljan as George Garnett
- Barbara Luddy as Alice Howard
- Tom Ricketts as Joseph Howard

== Bibliography ==
- Munden, Kenneth White (1997) [1971]. The American Film Institute Catalog of Motion Pictures Produced in the United States, Part 1. University of California Press. p. 709. ISBN 0520209699.
