= Desire (1923 film) =

1923 film by Rowland V. Lee

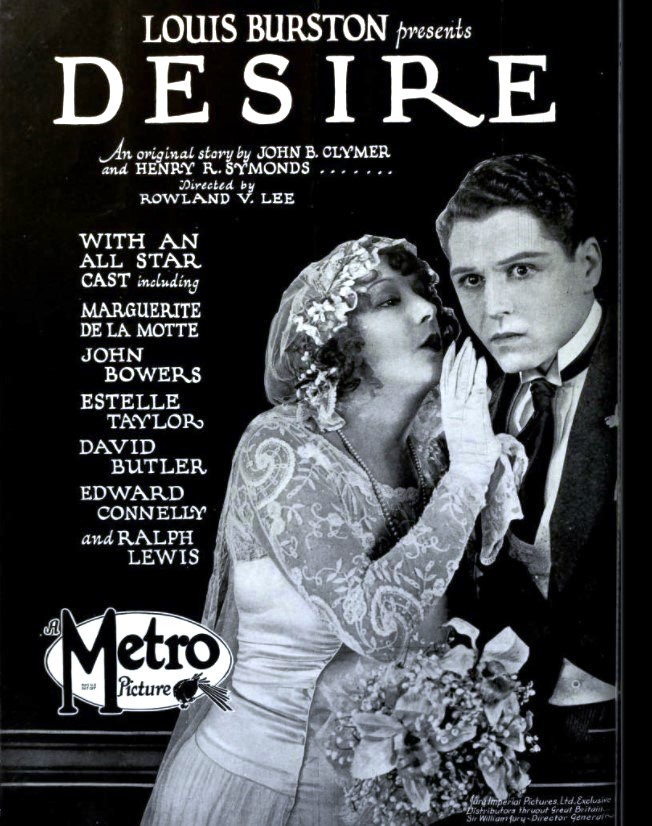
- Advertisement
- Directed by: Rowland V. Lee
- Written by: John B. Clymer; Henry Roberts Symonds
- Produced by: Louis Burstein
- Starring: Marguerite De La Motte; John Bowers; Estelle Taylor
- Cinematography: George Barnes
- Production company: Metro Pictures
- Distributed by: Metro Pictures
- Release date: October 1, 1923
- Running time: 70 minutes
- Country: United States
- Language: Silent (English intertitles)

Desire is a 1923 American silent drama film directed by Rowland V. Lee and starring Marguerite De La Motte, John Bowers, and Estelle Taylor. The film's sets were designed by art director John Hughes.

== Cast ==
- Marguerite De La Motte as Ruth Cassell
- John Bowers as Bob Elkins
- Estelle Taylor as Madalyn Harlan
- David Butler as Jerry Ryan
- Walter Long as Bud Reisner
- Lucille Hutton as Mamie Reisner
- Edward Connelly as Rupert Cassell
- Noah Beery as Hop Lee
- Ralph Lewis as De Witt Harlan
- Russell Simpson as Patrick Ryan
- Hank Mann as E.Z. Pickens
- Chester Conklin as Oland Young
- Vera Lewis as Mrs. De Witt Harlan
- Nick Cogley as Patrick Ryan
- Sylvia Ashton as Mrs. Patrick Ryan
- Frank Currier as Mr. Elkins
- Lars Landers as The Best Man

== Preservation ==
With no prints of Desire located in any film archives, it is a lost film.

== Bibliography ==
- Munden, Kenneth White. The American Film Institute Catalog of Motion Pictures Produced in the United States, Part 1. University of California Press, 1997.
