= By Whose Hand? =

By Whose Hand? can refer to:

- By Whose Hand? (1927 film), a 1927 American film
- By Whose Hand? (1932 film), a 1932 American film
