= The Danger Girl (1926 film) =

1926 film directed by Edward Dillon

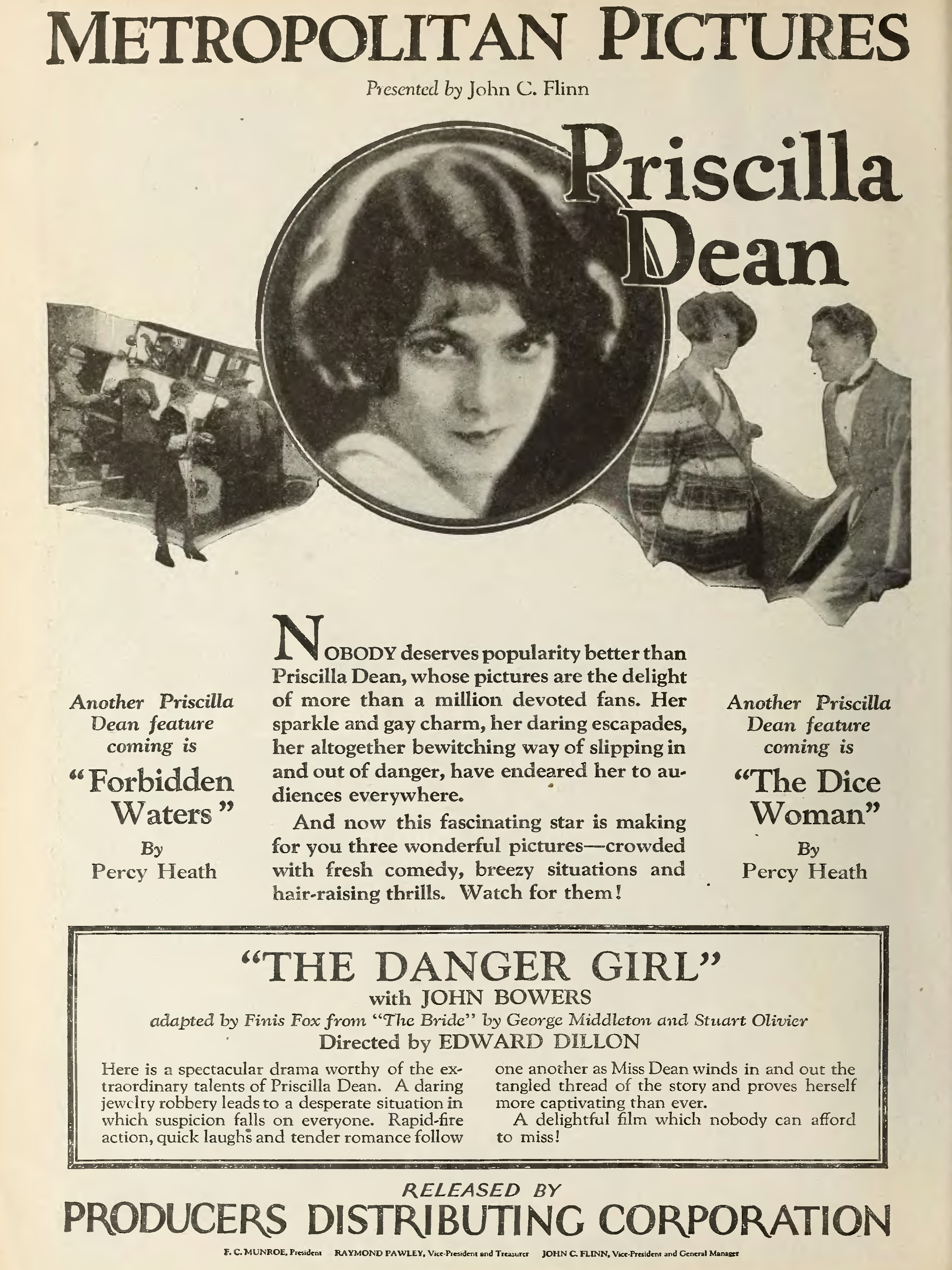
- Advertisement
- Directed by: Edward Dillon
- Written by: Finis Fox
- Based on: The Bride by George Middleton and Stuart Olivier
- Produced by: John C. Flinn
- Starring: Priscilla Dean; John Bowers; Gustav von Seyffertitz
- Cinematography: Georges Benoît
- Production company: Metropolitan Pictures Corporation of California
- Distributed by: Producers Distributing Corporation
- Release date: January 31, 1926
- Running time: 6 reels
- Country: United States
- Language: Silent (English intertitles)

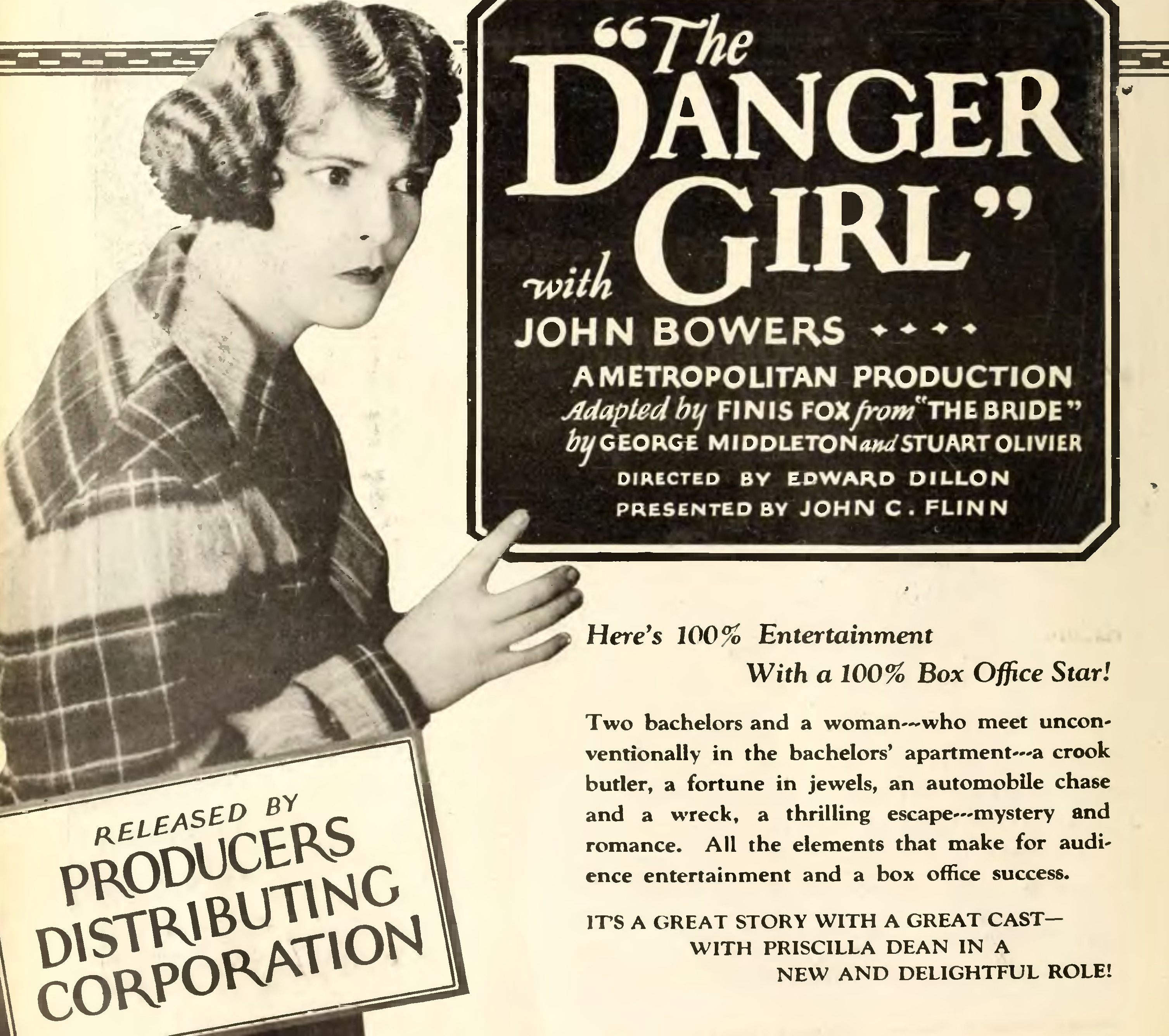
The Danger Girl ad in Motion Picture News, 1926

The Danger Girl is a 1926 American silent drama film directed by Edward Dillon and starring Priscilla Dean, John Bowers, and Gustav von Seyffertitz.

== Plot ==
As described in a film magazine review, Wilson and Mortimer Travers, brothers, live in a New York City mansion, with the elder brother being a jewel collector. The police are investigating a tip that the jewels will be stolen. Marie Duquesne, dressed as a bride, unexpectedly arrives, claiming to have fled from a distasteful marriage. Wilson allows her to remain. A series of complications ensues, with the jewels and Marie as the main focus. In the end Marie saves the jewels from the master thief. Wilson's gratitude turns to love for her.

== Cast ==
- Priscilla Dean as Marie Duquesne
- John Bowers as Wilson Travers
- Gustav von Seyffertitz as James, the butler
- Cissy Fitzgerald as Henrietta Travers
- Arthur Hoyt as Mortimer Travers
- William Humphrey as Pelham
- Clarence Burton as Organ man
- Erwin Connelly as Henderson

== Bibliography ==
- Munden, Kenneth White. The American Film Institute Catalog of Motion Pictures Produced in the United States, Part 1. University of California Press, 1997.
