= The People vs. Nancy Preston =

1925 film by Tom Forman

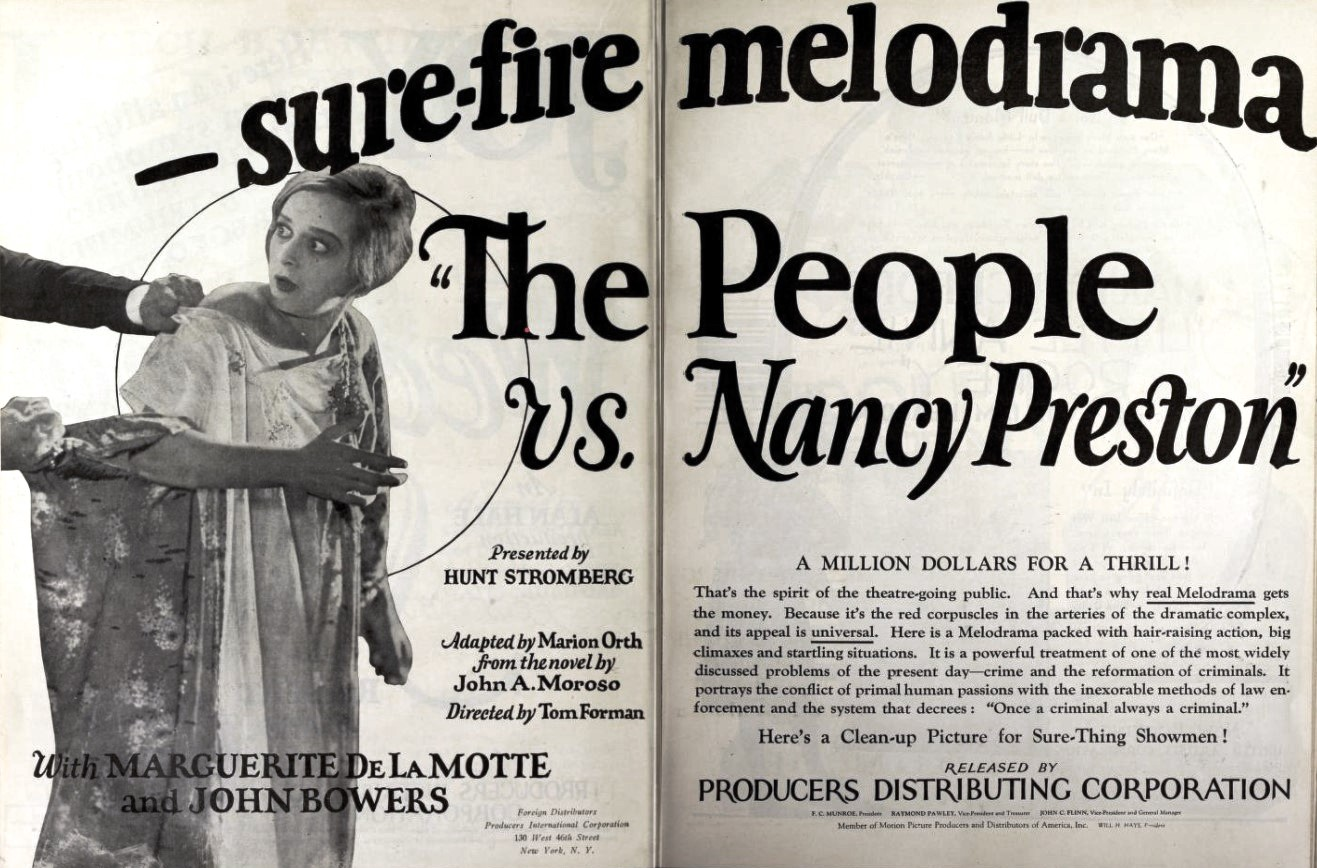
- Trade advertisement
- Directed by: Tom Forman
- Written by: Marion Orth
- Based on: The People Against Nancy Preston by John A. Moroso
- Produced by: Hunt Stromberg
- Starring: Marguerite De La Motte; John Bowers; Frankie Darro
- Cinematography: Sol Polito
- Edited by: Ralph Dixon
- Production company: Hunt Stromberg Productions
- Distributed by: Producers Distributing Corporation
- Release date: November 1, 1925
- Running time: 70 minutes
- Country: United States
- Language: Silent (English intertitles)

The People vs. Nancy Preston is a 1925 American silent drama film directed by Tom Forman and starring Marguerite De La Motte, John Bowers, and Frankie Darro. Prints of The People vs. Nancy Preston exist in the Library of Congress film archive and in the National Film, Television and Sound Archives of Canada film archive.

== Plot ==
As described in a film magazine reviews, Bill Preston and Mike Horgan, prisoners at Sing Sing, become friends, and while Bill dreams of the day when he will be with his wife Nancy and his boy Bubsy, Mike studies medicine so that he can go straight when he is released. Bill goes to work when he gets out, but Gloomy Gus Cole, operative for the Tierney Detective Agency, chases him from one job to another until he is forced to commit a robbery again to support his family and is killed attempting to break into a bank. Mike receives the dead man's request that he provide care and support for Nancy and the boy, and when he is released he goes to them. Cole is also shadowing Mike, and when a robbery is committed at the factory in which Mike works, he is accused. He escapes, but when he is discovered at Nancy's flat, both he and Nancy are arrested. In the detention home Nancy meets Enrico Pasquale, who provides her bail. At the trial Nancy is found innocent and Mike guilty. Pasquale attacks Nancy in her room, but she is rescued by Cole who locks Pasquale in the room. Here Pasquale is murdered and Nancy is accused. She escapes and communicates with Mike, who breaks out of prison and meets her. They go to a small town where he begins a practice of medicine. The pair is discovered by Tierney, who order Cole to come with a warrant for them. While they wait, Tierney becomes ill but is saved from death by Mike and Nancy. When Cole arrives, he swears as to Nancy's innocence. A short time later she and Mike are married.

== Cast ==
- Marguerite De La Motte as Nancy Preston
- John Bowers as Mike Horgan
- Frankie Darro as Bubsy
- David Butler as Bill Preston
- William V. Mong as Enrico Pasquale
- Alphonse Ethier as Tierney
- Edgar Kennedy as Gloomy Gus Cole
- Gertrude Short as Agnes
- Ray Gallagher as Texas Darcy
- Jackie Saunders as Hazy Mazie
- Mary Gordon as Mrs. Tifft

== Bibliography ==
- Munden, Kenneth White. The American Film Institute Catalog of Motion Pictures Produced in the United States, Part 1. University of California Press, 1997.
