= Flattery (film) =

1925 film

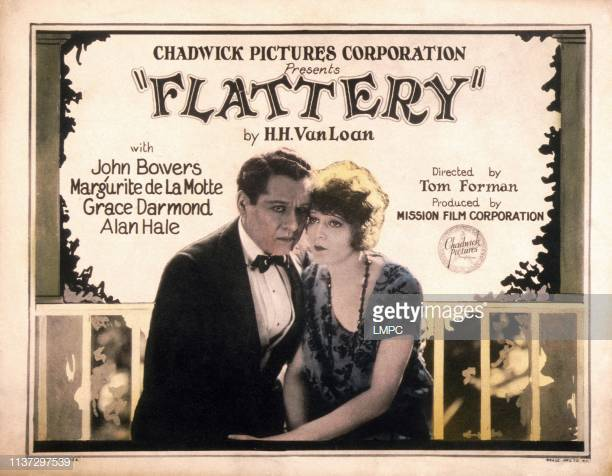
- Directed by: Tom Forman
- Written by: H.H. Van Loan
- Starring: John Bowers; Marguerite De La Motte; Alan Hale
- Cinematography: King D. Gray; Harry Perry
- Production company: Mission Film Corporation
- Distributed by: Chadwick Pictures
- Release date: February 15, 1925
- Running time: 50 minutes
- Country: United States
- Language: Silent (English intertitles)

Flattery is a 1925 American silent drama film directed by Tom Forman and starring John Bowers, Marguerite De La Motte, and Alan Hale.

== Plot ==
As described in a review in a film magazine, Reginald Mallory (Bowers) has been susceptible to flattery since youth. Politicians make him city engineer so that they may have a “goat,” and he is wheedled into signing a contract without reading it. All lose faith in Mallory except Betty Biddle (De La Motte), his sweetheart, daughter of the president of a construction company. Mallory apparently plays the game and turns crooked, but in the end it is discovered that he has been obtaining evidence against the crooks.

== Cast ==
- John Bowers as Reginald Mallory
- Marguerite De La Motte as Betty Biddle
- Alan Hale as Arthur Barrington
- Grace Darmond as Allene King
- Edwards Davis as John Biddle
- Louis Morrison as Mayor
- Larry Steers as District Attorney
- Newton Hall (uncredited)

== Preservation ==
With no prints of Flattery located in any film archives, it is a lost film.

== Bibliography ==
- Munden, Kenneth White. The American Film Institute Catalog of Motion Pictures Produced in the United States, Part 1. University of California Press, 1997.
