= Hearts and Fists =

1926 film

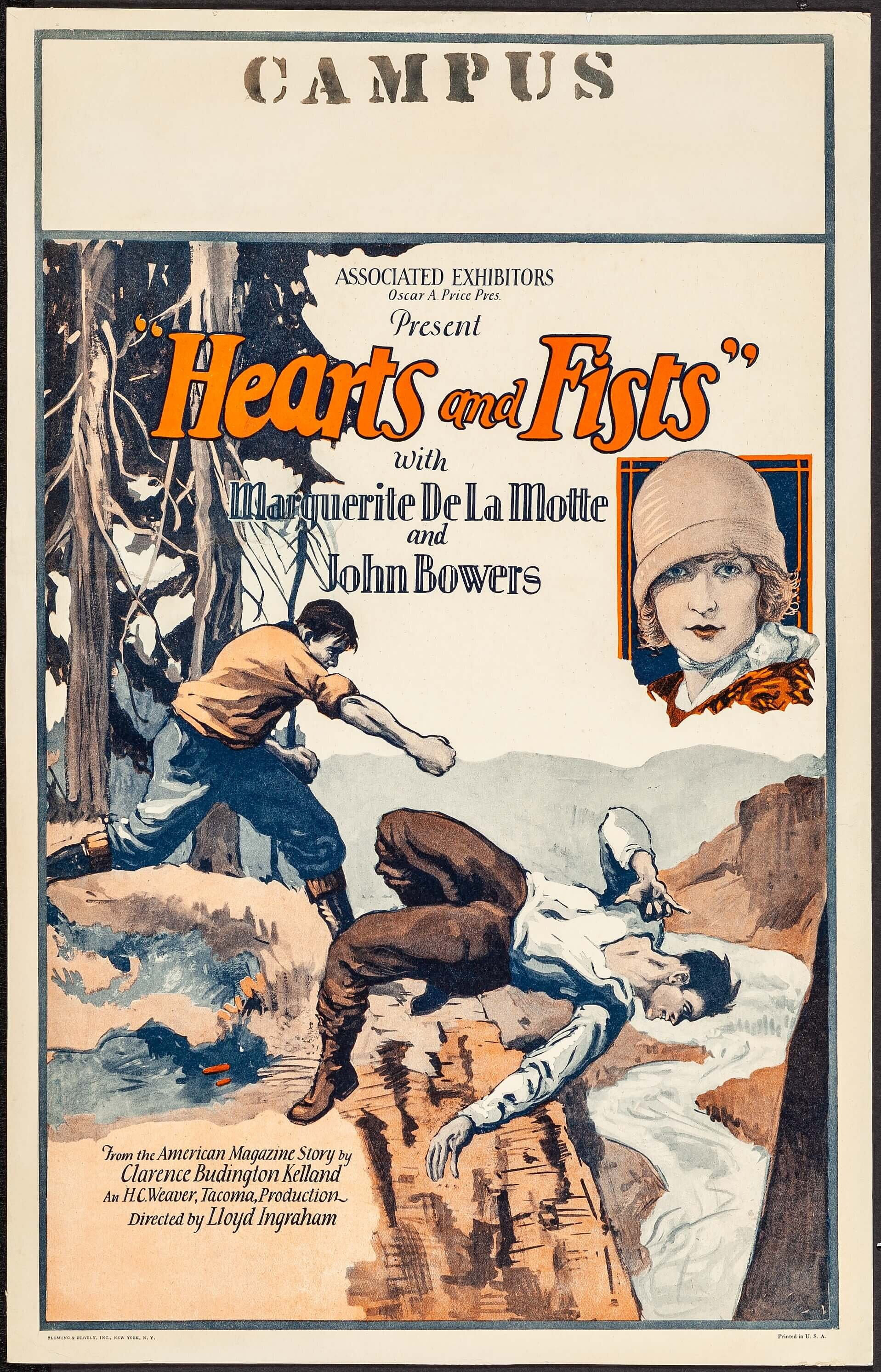
- Directed by: Lloyd Ingraham
- Written by: Clarence Budington Kelland; Paul Schofield
- Produced by: H.C. Weaver
- Starring: John Bowers; Marguerite De La Motte; Alan Hale
- Cinematography: Abe Scholtz
- Edited by: Peter L. Shamray
- Production company: H.C. Weaver Productions
- Distributed by: Associated Exhibitors
- Release date: August 9, 1926
- Running time: 6 reels
- Country: United States
- Language: Silent (English intertitles)

Hearts and Fists is a 1926 American silent drama film directed by Lloyd Ingraham and starring John Bowers, Marguerite De La Motte, and Alan Hale.

== Plot ==
As described in a film magazine review, Larry Pond, a young man whose father dies and leaves him a failing lumbering business, falls in love with Alexia Newton, the fiancé of his crooked business rival. His rival attempts to ruin his plant. His blocking the attempt proves to the young woman which is the better man, and an unusual marriage ceremony follows.

== Cast ==
- John Bowers as Larry Pond
- Marguerite De La Motte as Alexia Newton
- Alan Hale as Preston Tolley
- Dan Mason as Tacitus Hopper
- Lois Ingraham as Jean Carroll
- Howard Russell as Luther Newton
- Jack Curtis as Gus Brent
- Kent Mead as Egbert Head
- Charles Hill Mailes as Bill Fawcett

== Bibliography ==
- Munden, Kenneth White. The American Film Institute Catalog of Motion Pictures Produced in the United States, Part 1. University of California Press, 1997.
