= What a Wife Learned =

1923 film

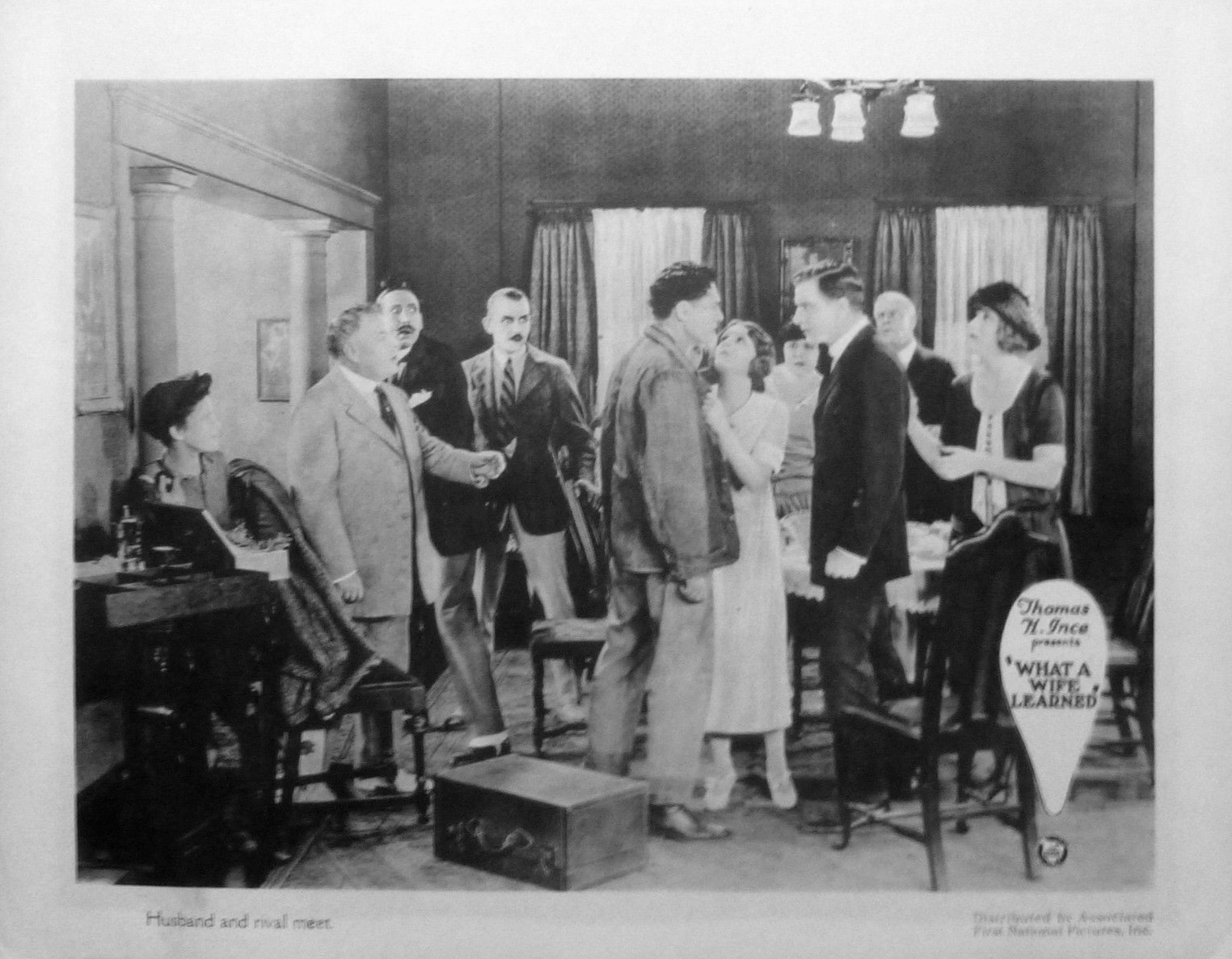
- Lobby card
- Directed by: John Griffith Wray
- Screenplay by: Bradley King
- Starring: John Bowers; Milton Sills; Marguerite De La Motte; Evelyn McCoy; Harry Todd; Aggie Herring
- Cinematography: Henry Sharp
- Production company: Thomas H. Ince Corporation
- Distributed by: Associated First National Pictures
- Release date: January 28, 1923
- Running time: 70 minutes
- Country: United States
- Language: Silent (English intertitles)

What a Wife Learned is a 1923 American silent drama film directed by John Griffith Wray and starring John Bowers, Milton Sills, Marguerite De La Motte, Evelyn McCoy, Harry Todd, and Aggie Herring. Written by Bradley King, the film was released on January 28, 1923, by Associated First National Pictures. A print of What a Wife Learned exists in the Gosfilmofond film archive in Moscow, Russia.

== Plot ==
As described in a film magazine, Sheila Dorne fears that marriage would interfere with the literary career that she plans for herself, but nonetheless yields to her love for Jim Russell and weds him. Jim is a cattle rancher and man of dominant personality. Sheila scores a success with her first novel and it is dramatized. This work compels her to visit New York City and, although Jim's love for her is undiminished, it becomes evident that he is not happy with the turn things have taken.

When the play is ready for presentation, Sheila prepares to go to New York City. An argument with Jim results, and there is a misunderstanding and considerable ill-feeling between the two as Sheila leaves. Only Jim's crippled sister Esther realizes his heart ache as Jim turns his attention to the building of an immense dam and tries to forget. The dam is finished and its test comes with the flood waters. Sheila returns home, accompanied by Rudolph Martin, who has dramatized her play and incidentally fallen in love with her, having become convinced that she no longer cares for her husband.

Sheila and Martin become trapped by the flood waters. Sheila reaches a place of safety, and Jim and Rudolph struggle in the waters. Jim emerges, but then returns to save the man he imagines his wife loves. The dramatist, however, realizes the truth when Sheila rushes to aid them. She is left alone with Jim, whose dam has successfully met the flood test and is happy in his wife's love.

== Cast ==
- John Bowers as Jim Russell
- Milton Sills as Rudolph Martin
- Marguerite De La Motte as Sheila Dorne
- Evelyn McCoy as Esther Russell
- Harry Todd as Tracy McGrath
- Aggie Herring as Maggie McGrath
- Francelia Billington as Lillian Martin
- Bertram Johns as Percy
- Ernest Butterworth Jr. as Terry
- John Steppling as Maxfield
