= Off the Highway =

1925 film by Tom Forman

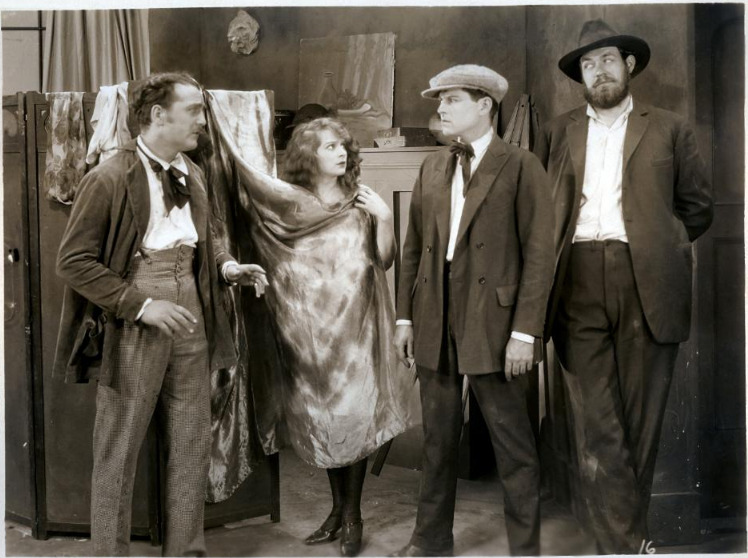
- Directed by: Tom Forman
- Written by: Dorothy Farnum
- Produced by: Hunt Stromberg
- Starring: William V. Mong; Marguerite De La Motte; John Bowers
- Cinematography: Georges Benoit
- Production company: Hunt Stromberg Productions
- Distributed by: Producers Distributing Corporation
- Release date: August 15, 1925
- Running time: 80 minutes
- Country: United States
- Languages: Silent; English intertitles

Off the Highway is a 1925 American silent drama film directed by Tom Forman and starring William V. Mong, Marguerite De La Motte and John Bowers.

== Cast ==
- William V. Mong as Caleb Fry / Tatterly
- Marguerite De La Motte as Ella Tarrant
- John Bowers as Donald Brett
- Charles K. Gerrard as Hector Kindon
- Gino Corrado as Rabbitt
- Charles A. Post as Grizzly Bear
- Josef Swickard as Master
- Bowditch M. Turner as Student

== Bibliography ==
- Goble, Alan. The Complete Index to Literary Sources in Film. Walter de Gruyter, 1999.
