= William V. Mong =

American actor (1875–1940)

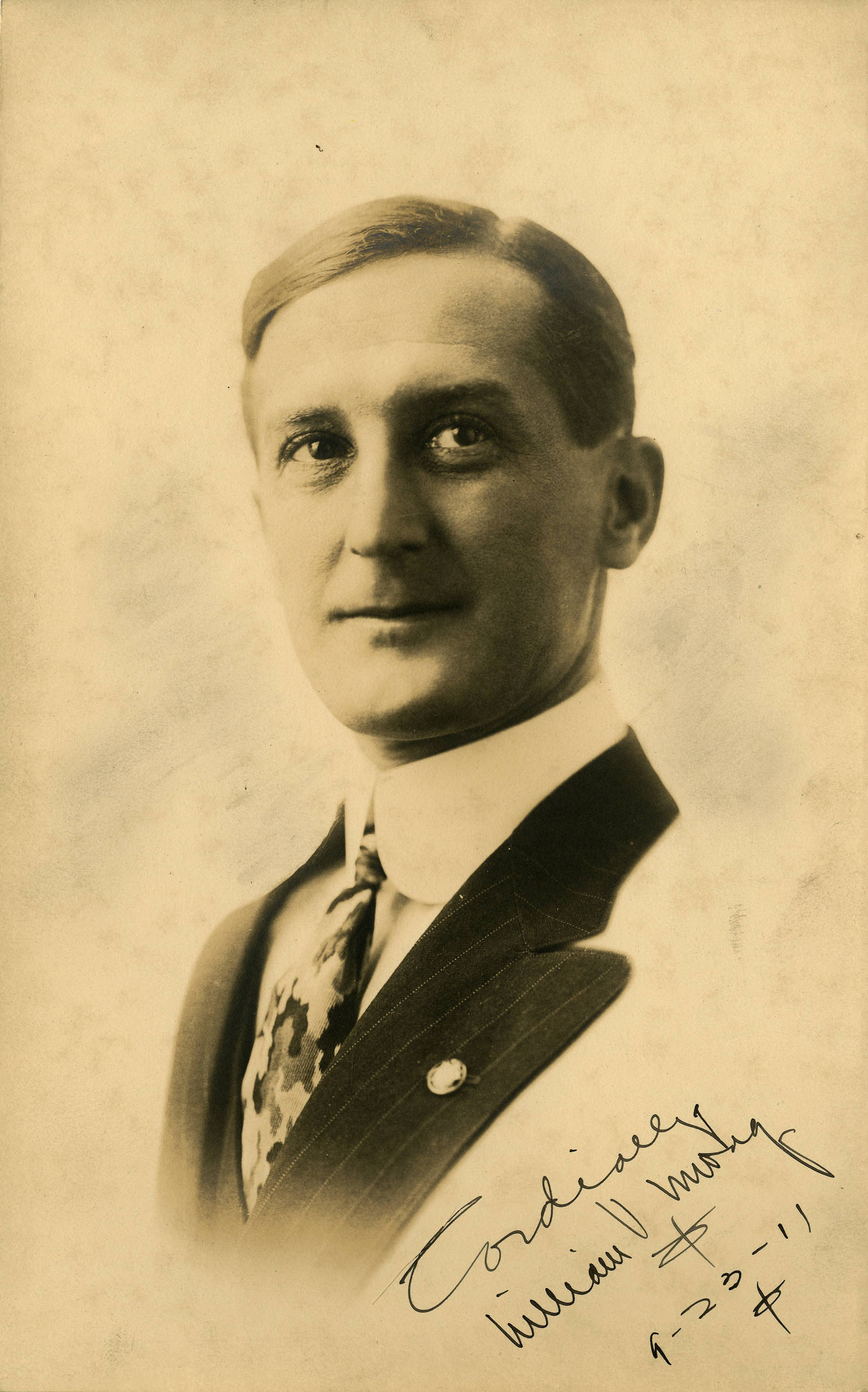
- Mong in 1911
- Born: June 25, 1875; Chambersburg, Pennsylvania; United States
- Died: December 10, 1940 (aged 65); Studio City, California; United States
- Resting place: Grand View Memorial Park Cemetery
- Occupations: Actor, film director, screenwriter
- Years active: 1910–1939
- Spouse: Emma Warde

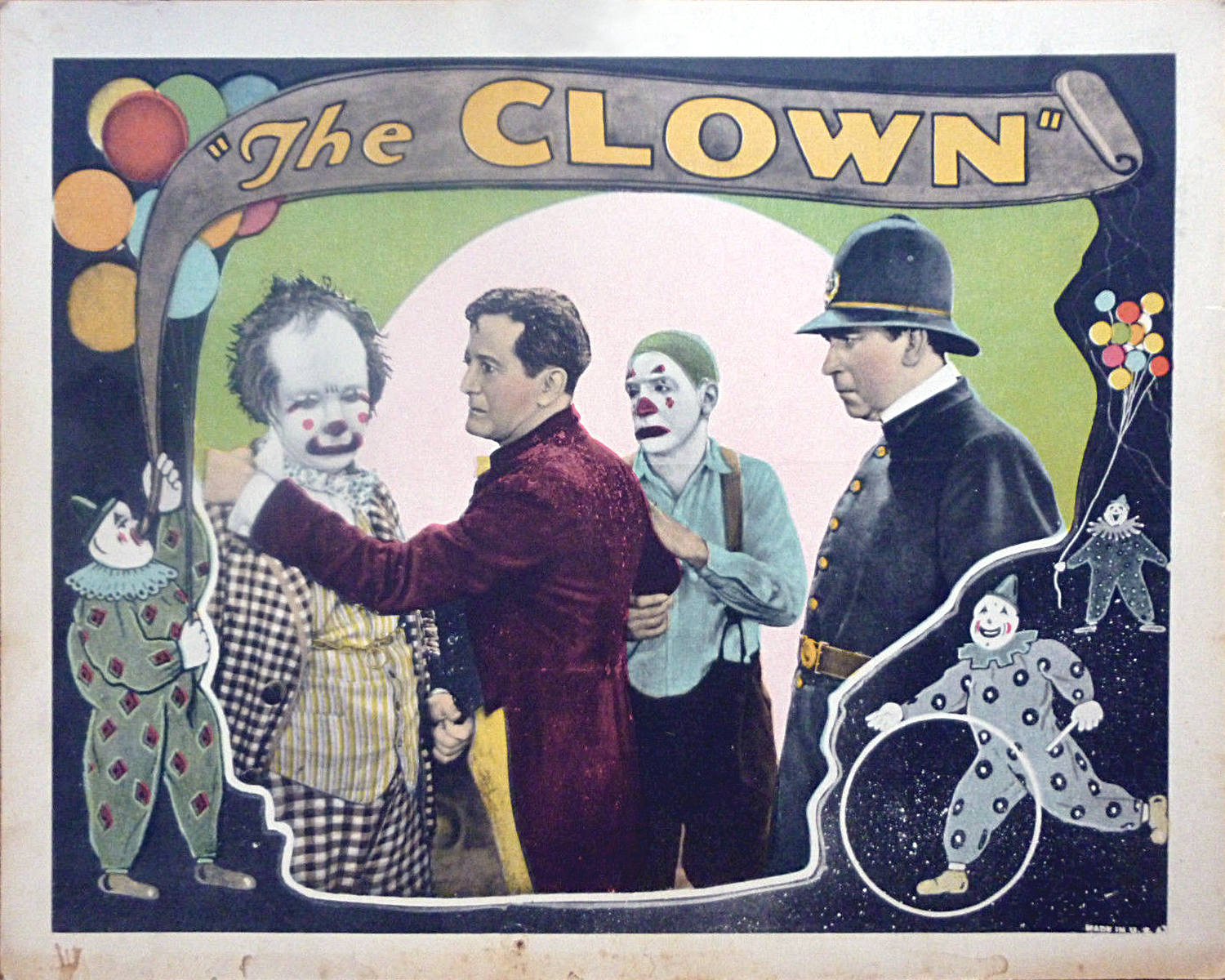
Mong wearing red robe in the 1927 comedy The Clown.

William V. Mong (June 25, 1875 – December 10, 1940) was an American film actor, screenwriter and director. He appeared in almost 200 films between 1910 and 1939. His directing (1911–1918) and screenwriting (1911–1922) were mostly for short films.

He was born June 25, 1875, in Chambersburg, Pennsylvania, and married Esme Warde. He started out as a vaudeville and stage actor, appearing in plays in Los Angeles, Chicago, and New York City. He made his film debut in the 1910 film A Connecticut Yankee.

Mong fell ill in 1938 and stopped acting. He lingered two years, and then died on December 10, 1940, in Studio City, California. He was interred at Grand View Memorial Park Cemetery in Glendale, California.

== Selected filmography (acting) ==
- The Connecticut Yankee (1910)
- The Way of the Eskimo (1911)
- Lost in the Arctic (1911)
- Two Men of Sandy Bar (1916)
- Shoes (1916) - "Cabaret" Charlie
- Eleanor's Catch (1916)
- The Iron Hand (1916)
- The Prince of Graustark (1916)
- The Girl and the Crisis (1917)
- Fanatics (1917)
- The Spender (1919)
- After His Own Heart (1919)
- The Follies Girl (1919)
- The Master Man (1919)
- The Amateur Adventuress (1919)
- Love's Prisoner (1919) - Jonathan Twist
- The Delicious Little Devil (1919) - Larry McKean
- Fools and Their Money (1919) - Martin Tompkins
- The Luck of Geraldine Laird (1920)
- Number 99 (1920)
- The Chorus Girl's Romance (1920)
- The Dwelling Place of Light (1920)
- The Turning Point (1920)
- The Coast of Opportunity (1920)
- Burning Daylight (1920) - Necessity
- A Connecticut Yankee in King Arthur's Court (1921) - Merlin
- Sowing the Wind (1921)
- Shame (1921)
- Pilgrims of the Night (1921)
- The Ten Dollar Raise (1921)
- Ladies Must Live (1921) - Max Bleeker
- Shattered Idols (1922)
- The Woman He Loved (1922)
- The Winding Trail (1922)
- Monte Cristo (1922)
- The Woman He Loved (1922)
- Lost and Found on a South Sea Island (1923) - Skinner
- Drifting (1923) - Dr. Li
- Wandering Daughters (1923)
- Thy Name Is Woman (1924) - Pedro the Fox (Garita's husband)
- Why Men Leave Home (1924)
- What Shall I Do? (1924)
- Flapper Wives (1924)
- Welcome Stranger (1924)
- Excuse Me (1925)
- Oh Doctor! (1925) - Mr. McIntosh
- Alias Mary Flynn (1925) - John Reagan
- Fine Clothes (1925)
- Steel Preferred (1925)
- The People vs. Nancy Preston (1925)
- Barriers Burned Away (1925)
- Speed (1925)
- Under the Rouge (1925)
- Off the Highway (1925)
- The Shadow on the Wall (1925)
- The Unwritten Law (1925)
- Shadow of the Law (1926)
- Crazy Like a Fox (1926)
- The Silent Lover (1926)
- Brooding Eyes (1926)
- Fifth Avenue (1926)
- The Old Soak (1926) - Cousin Webster
- What Price Glory? (1926)
- Taxi! Taxi! (1927) - Nosey Ricketts
- The Magic Garden (1927)
- Alias the Lone Wolf (1927)
- Too Many Crooks (1927)
- The Clown (1927) - Albert Wells
- No Babies Wanted (1928) - Michael O'Day
- Code of the Air (1928) - Professor Ross
- Ransom (1928) - Wu Fang
- Noah's Ark (1928)
- The Broken Mask (1928)
- Should a Girl Marry? (1928)
- The Haunted House (1928)
- House of Horror (1929)
- Dark Skies (1929)
- Murder on the Roof (1930)
- In Gay Madrid (1930)
- The Girl Said No (1930)
- Gun Smoke (1931)
- A Dangerous Affair (1931)
- The Fighting Fool (1932)
- Dynamite Denny (1932)
- The Arm of the Law (1932)
- Love Bound (1932)
- War Correspondent (1932)
- The Widow in Scarlet (1932)
- Women Won't Tell (1932)
- A Strange Adventure (1932)
- The Sign of the Cross (1932) - Licinius / Old Man Carrying Child
- Silent Men (1933)
- I Loved a Woman (1933)
- Her Forgotten Past (1933)
- Dark Hazard (1934)
- Treasure Island (1934)
- Together We Live (1935)
- The Last Days of Pompeii (1935)
- The Dark Hour (1936)
- Stand-In (1937)
- Painted Desert (1938)
