= Forbidden Waters =

1926 film directed by Alan Hale

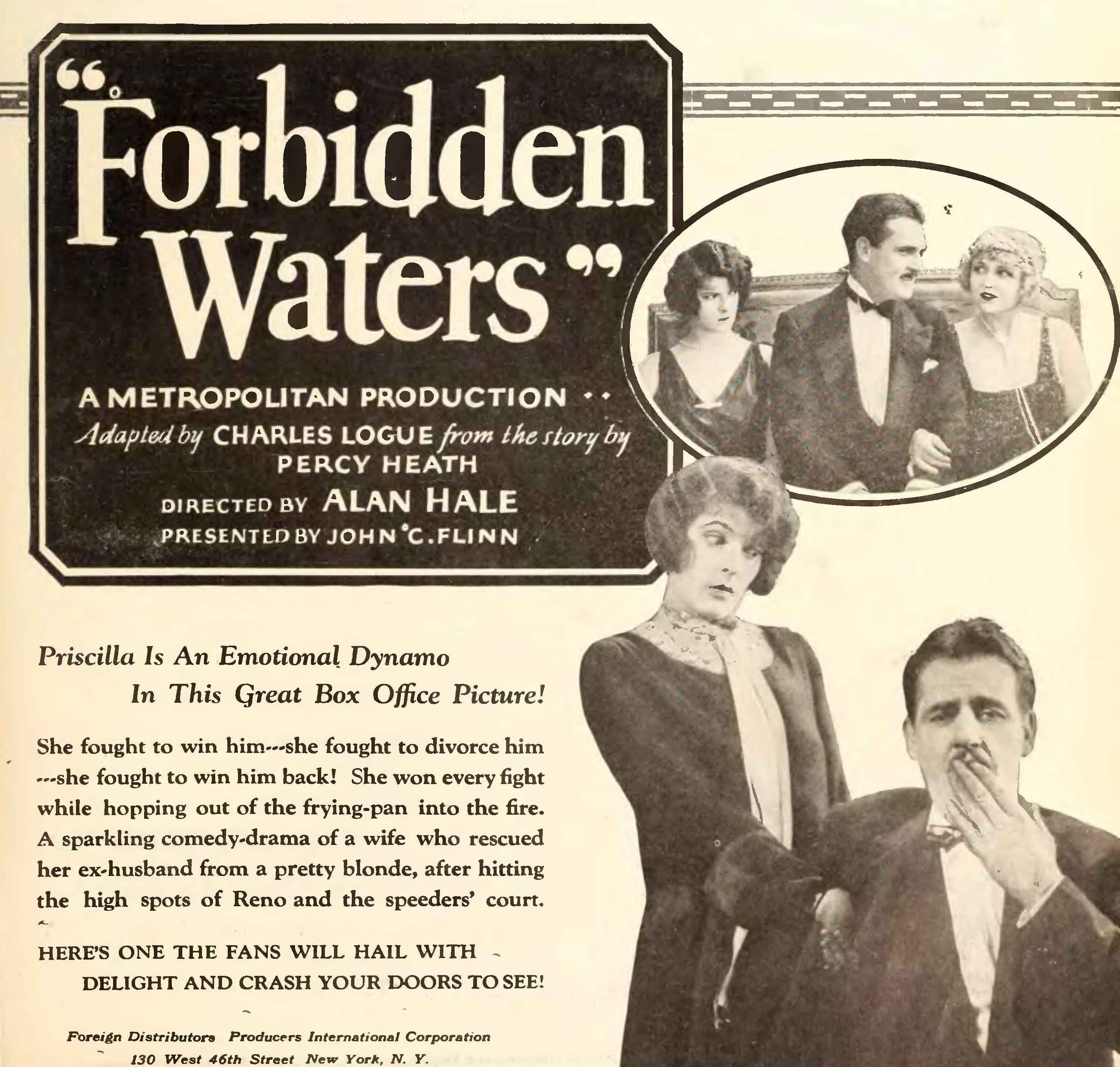
- Advertisement
- Directed by: Alan Hale
- Written by: Percy Heath; Charles A. Logue
- Produced by: John C. Flinn
- Starring: Priscilla Dean; Walter McGrail; Dan Mason
- Cinematography: Georges Benoît
- Production company: Metropolitan Pictures Corporation of California
- Distributed by: Producers Distributing Corporation
- Release date: March 21, 1926
- Running time: 60 minutes
- Country: United States
- Language: Silent (English intertitles)

Forbidden Waters is a 1926 American silent comedy film directed by Alan Hale and starring Priscilla Dean, Walter McGrail, and Dan Mason.

== Plot ==
As described in a film magazine review, J. Austin Bell, a divorced man, promises his former wife Nancy not to marry again unless she approves of the woman. He becomes infatuated with Ruby, an adventuress, who vows to win him from the courting of his former wife. The wife is aided by a man who has been robbed of some letters by the adventuress and her confederate. At the critical moment, Bell has the two arrested when Ruby goes too far in her scheme, and the man remarries his former wife.

== Cast ==
- Priscilla Dean as Nancy Bell
- Walter McGrail as J. Austin Bell
- Dan Mason as Nugget Pete
- Casson Ferguson as Sylvester
- De Sacia Mooers as Ruby

== Bibliography ==
- Munden, Kenneth White. The American Film Institute Catalog of Motion Pictures Produced in the United States, Part 1. University of California Press, 1997.
