= Marguerite De La Motte =

American actress

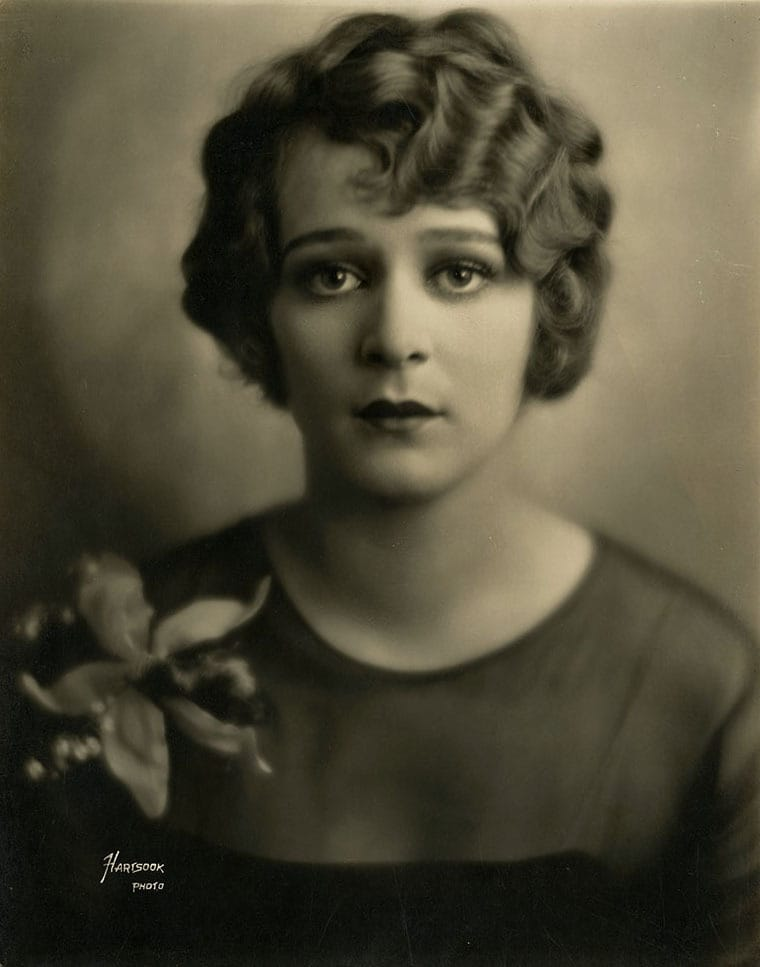
- De La Motte, c. 1924
- Born: June 22, 1902; Duluth, Minnesota, U.S.
- Died: March 10, 1950 (aged 47); San Francisco, California, U.S.
- Occupation: Actress
- Years active: 1918–1942
- Spouse: John Bowers (m. 1924; died 1936)
- Parent(s): Mr. and Mrs. Joseph De La Motte

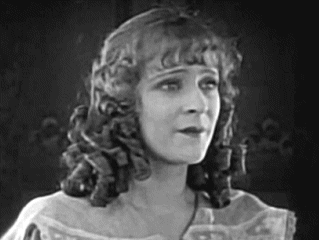
Marguerite De La Motte in The Three Musketeers (1921)

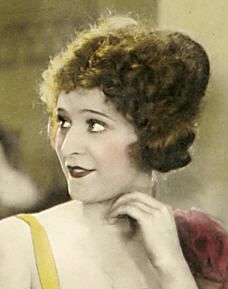
Marguerite De La Motte from the movie The Nut in 1921

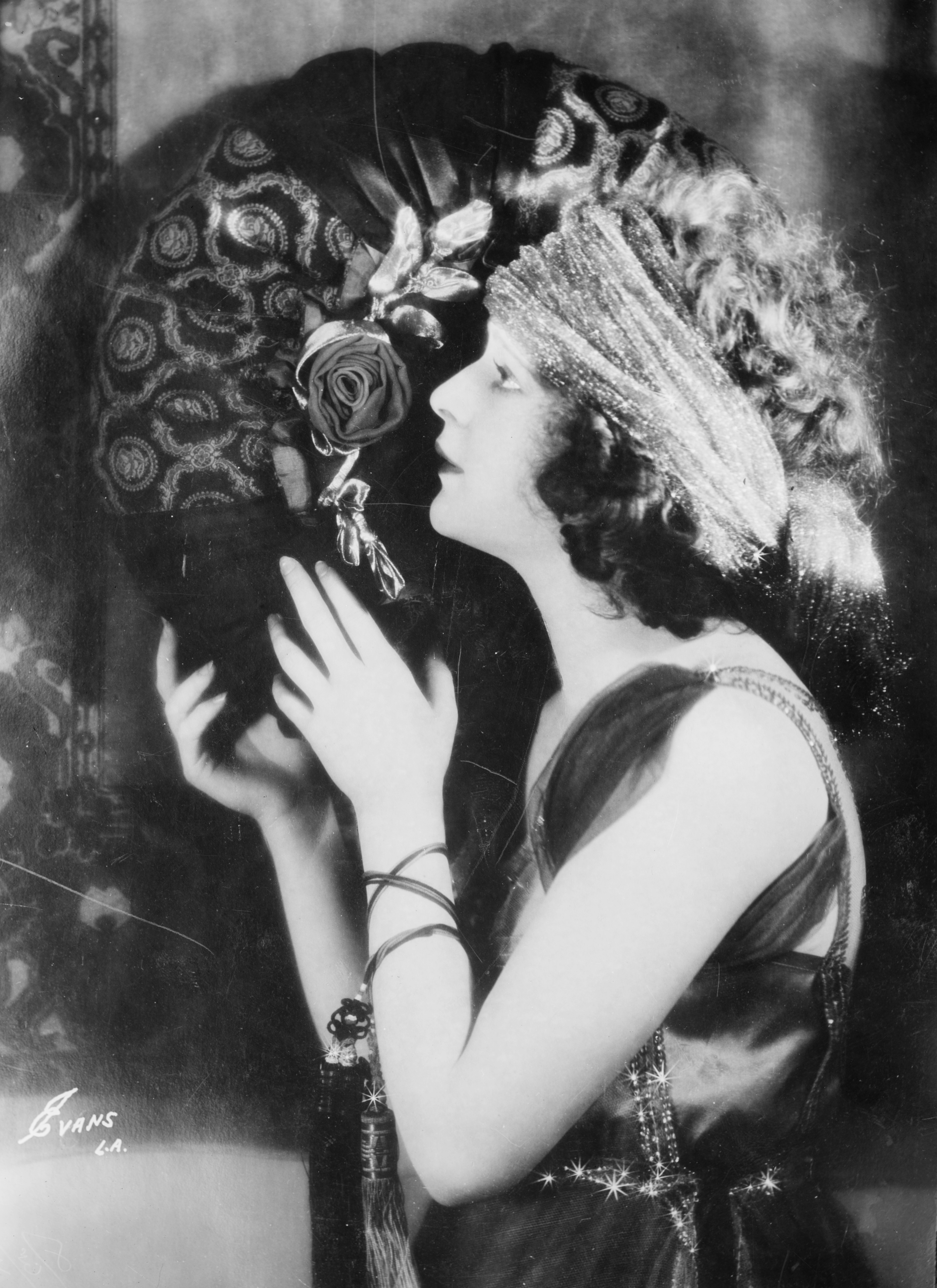
De La Motte in 1921.

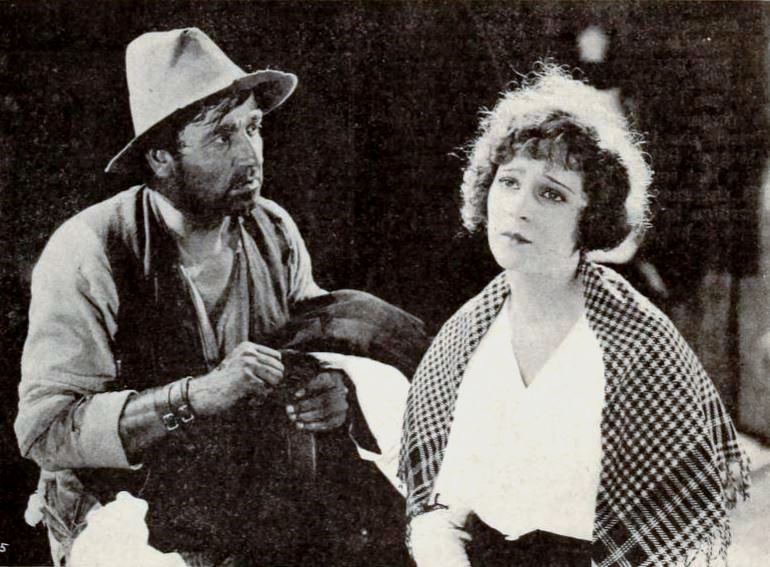
Still from the American western film The Sagebrusher (1920) with Noah Beery and Marguerite De La Motte

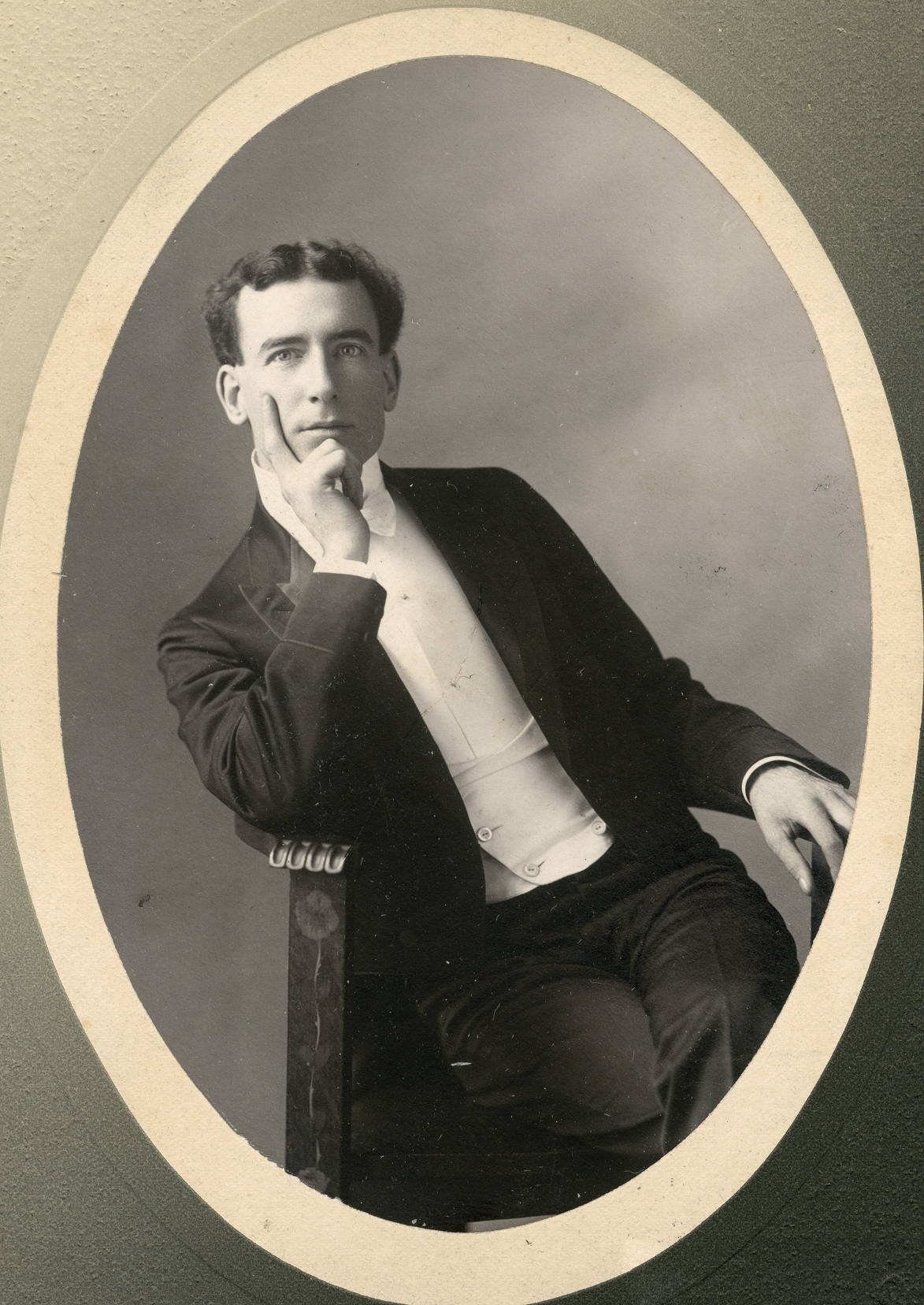
Frank C. Egan, drama instructor

Marguerite De La Motte (June 22, 1902 – March 10, 1950) was an American film actress, most notably of the silent film era.

== Early years ==
Born in Duluth, Minnesota, De La Motte was the daughter of Mr. and Mrs. Joseph De La Motte. She was a 1917 graduate of the Frank C. Egan's Frank Egan School of Drama.

== Entertainment career ==
De La Motte began her entertainment career studying ballet under Anna Pavlova. In 1919, she became the dance star of Sid Grauman on the stage of his theater. In 1918, at the age of 16, she made her screen debut in the Douglas Fairbanks-directed romantic comedy film Arizona. In 1920, both of her parents died, her mother in January in an automobile accident and her father in August from heart disease. Film producer J. L. Frothingham assumed guardianship of her and her younger brother.

De La Motte spent the 1920s appearing in numerous films, often cast by Douglas Fairbanks to play opposite him in swashbuckling adventure films such as 1920's The Mark of Zorro and The Three Musketeers. She developed a close friendship with Fairbanks and his wife, actress Mary Pickford. Her career as an actress slowed dramatically at the end of the silent film era of the 1920s. She did continue acting in bit parts through the sound era and made her final appearance in the 1942 film Overland Mail opposite both Noah Beery Sr. and Noah Beery Jr., as well as Lon Chaney Jr.

== Later career ==
After her film career ended, De La Motte worked as an inspector in a southern California war plant during World War II. Later she came to San Francisco, California, where she worked in the Red Cross office.

== Personal life ==
De La Motte was married twice. She first wed silent film actor John Bowers in 1924, who was then a matinee idol of the silver screen. That marriage ended with Bowers's suicide in 1936. De La Motte later married attorney Sidney H. Rivkin whom she divorced after four years of marriage. Her cousin, Clete Roberts, was an American war correspondent and journalist, who appeared in two episodes of the television series M*A*S*H* in the 1970s.

== Death ==
On March 10, 1950, De La Motte died of cerebral thrombosis in San Francisco at the age of 47, and interred at Olivet Gardens of Cypress Lawn Memorial Park.

== Recognition ==
On February 8, 1960, De La Motte was awarded a star in the Motion Pictures section of the Hollywood Walk of Fame at 6902 Hollywood Blvd., in Hollywood, California.

== Filmography ==
Year	Title	Role	Notes
1918	Arizona	Lena	Lost film
1919	Josselyn's Wife	Lizzie	Lost film
1919	A Sage Brush Hamlet	Dora Lawrence	Incomplete film
1919	The Pagan God	Beryl Addison	
1919	For a Woman's Honor	Helen Rutherford	Lost film
1919	Dangerous Waters	Cora Button	
1919	In Wrong	Millie Fields	A copy is held at the Library of Congress
1920	The Hope	Lady Brenda Carylon	A copy is held at the George Eastman Museum
1920	Trumpet Island	Eve de Merincourt	
1920	The U.P. Trail	Allie Lee	
1920	The Sagebrusher	Mary Warren	
1920	The Mark of Zorro	Lolita Pulido	
1920	The Broken Gate	Anne Oglesby	Lost film
1921	The Nut	Estrell Wynn	
1921	The Ten Dollar Raise	Dorothy	Lost film
1921	The Three Musketeers	Constance Bonacieux	
1922	Shadows	Sympathy Malden	
1922	Shattered Idols	Sarasvati	
1922	The Jilt	Rose Trenton	Lost film
1922	Fools of Fortune	Marion DePuyster	A copy is held at the George Eastman Museum
1923	The Famous Mrs. Fair	Sylvia Fair	
1923	What a Wife Learned	Sheila Dorne	A copy is held at the Gosfilmofond
1923	Scars of Jealousy	Helen Meanix	Copies are held at the Cinémathèque royale de Belgique, UCLA Film & Television Archive, and George Eastman Museum
1923	Just Like a Woman	Peggy Dean	Copies are held at the Library of Congress and the George Eastman Museum
1923	A Man of Action	Helen Sumner	A copy is held at the EYE Film Institute Netherlands
1923	Wandering Daughters	Bessie Bowden	
1923	Desire	Ruth Cassell	Lost film
1923	Richard the Lion-Hearted	Lady Edith Plantagenet	A copy is held at the Centre national du cinéma et de l'image animée
1924	The Beloved Brute	Jacinta	A copy is held at the EYE Film Institute Netherlands
1924	Behold This Woman	Sophie	Incomplete film
1924	The Clean Heart	Essie Bickers	Lost film
1924	East of Broadway	Judy McNulty	
1924	When a Man's a Man	Helen Wakefield	An incomplete copy is held at the UCLA Film & Television Archive
1924	Gerald Cranston's Lady	Angela	Lost film
1924	Those Who Dare	Marjorie	A copy is held at the Cineteca Italiana
1924	In Love with Love	Ann Jordan	A copy is held at the Library of Congress
1925	Cheaper to Marry	Doris	Lost film
1925	Daughters Who Pay	Sonia Borisoff/Margaret Smith	A copy is held at the George Eastman Museum
1925	Flattery	Betty Biddle	Lost film
1925	Children of the Whirlwind	Maggie	
1925	Off the Highway	Ella Tarrant	Lost film
1925	The People vs. Nancy Preston	Nancy Preston	A copy is held at the Library of Congress
1925	The Girl Who Wouldn't Work	Mary Hale	A copy is held at the Library of Congress
1926	Red Dice	Beverly Vane	Lost film
1926	Meet the Prince	Annabelle Ford	Lost film
1926	Fifth Avenue	Barbara Pelham	Lost film
1926	Hearts and Fists	Alexia Newton	
1926	The Last Frontier	Beth	A copy is held at the Centre national du cinéma et de l'image animée
1926	The Unknown Soldier	Mary Phillips	Copies are held at the Library of Congress and the UCLA Film & Television Archive
1926	Pals in Paradise	Geraldine "Jerry" Howard	Lost film
1927	The Final Extra	Ruth Collins	
1927	Held by the Law	Mary Travis	Lost film
1927	The Kid Sister	Helen Hall	Lost film
1927	Ragtime	Beth Barton	Lost film
1927	Broadway Madness	Maida Vincent	Lost film
1929	The Iron Mask	Constance	
1929	Montmartre Rose	Jeanne	
1930	Shadow Ranch	Ruth Cameron	A copy is held at the Library of Congress
1934	A Woman's Man	Gloria Jordan	
1941	Reg'lar Fellers	Mrs. Dugan	
1942	The Man Who Returned to Life	Mrs. Hibbard	
1942	Overland Mail	Rose, the Waitress	

== Sources ==
- "Marguerite De La Motte III". New York Times. February 28, 1950. p. 21.
