= De Sacia Mooers =

American actress

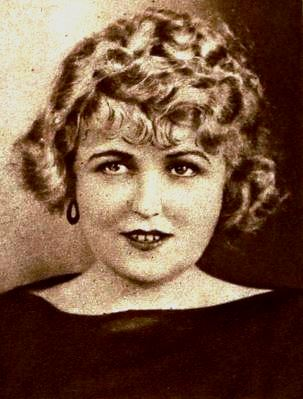
- Mooers in 1922
- Born: De Sacia Mooers; November 19, 1888
- Died: January 11, 1960 (aged 71); Los Angeles, California, U.S.
- Occupation: Actress
- Spouse: Edward Demarest Mooers (1917–1925) Harry Lewis

De Sacia Mooers (November 19, 1888 – January 11, 1960) was a film actress, disputably from Los Angeles, California. She appeared in over one hundred movies in the silent film era. She was perhaps best known as the "Blonde Vamp" for her role in The Blonde Vampire in 1922. Her career ended with talking films.

== Early life ==
Newspaper accounts of the era differ as to her birthplace. At the time, it was common for the various studios to exaggerate or fabricate an actor's biography to make them seem more exotic and interesting to the general public. One report contends that she was a Los Angeles native and a member of the California Saville family. This is borne out by the fact that she was billed as De Sacia Saville in the serial The Son of Tarzan (1920). The Savilles were among California's pioneer settlers. Another article says that Mooers was from New York. Yet another source has her birthplace as Michigan. A 1927 movie review described her ancestry as French-Dutch.

== Movie career ==
She began her career with Samuel Goldwyn Productions. At first she was known as De Sacia Saville. In the comedy Potash and Perlmutter (1923), she was cast with Martha Mansfield and Ben Lyon.

Mooers began working on a series of vamp roles starting with The Blonde Vampire in 1922. Mooers was writing a book at the time. It was due to be published when the vamp film was released. A natural blond, Mooers defied the stereotype of a vamp having to have dark hair.

Mooers appeared in over one hundred movies in the silent film era. Among her co-stars were Tom Mix and Warner Baxter. Mooers made Lonesome Ladies (1927), a First National Pictures comedy-drama about romance and marital strife. The screenplay was written by Lenore Coffee and the film featured Lewis Stone and Anna Q. Nilsson. Her final movie was a western, The Arizona Kid (1930). It stars Baxter, Carole Lombard, and Mona Maris.

Mooers also performed on stage in New York City.

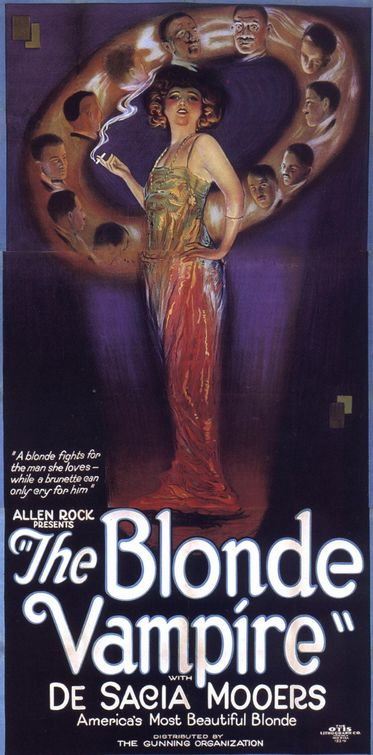
Mooers on poster for The Blonde Vampire (1922)

== Personal life ==
In 1917, Mooers became the wife of Edward "Eddie" Demarest Mooers, owner of the Yellow Aster gold mine in Randsburg, California, the richest gold mine in the United States. Mr. Mooers' family disapproved of her career from the time she left her home on Alvarado Terrace, barely out of her teens. An agreement was made in which representatives of the wealthy husband's family accompanied him to Mooers' studio once a month. They observed her behavior for signs of changes. The union between actress and mining scion became fractured and collapsed after the inquisitors decided Mooers had become less "lovely, charming, and conventional". The couple were divorced in May 1925.

Mooers had a relationship with Allan Rock, who produced "The Blonde Vampire." Mooers signed as a witness on the contract that Rock made with "America's First Supermodel", Audrey Munson, that led to Munson's syndicated 1921 newspaper series and its spin-off movie "Heedless Moths" (1921)

Mooers later married actor Harry Lewis. She was a member of the Woman's Breakfast Club and director of the McKinley Home For Boys.

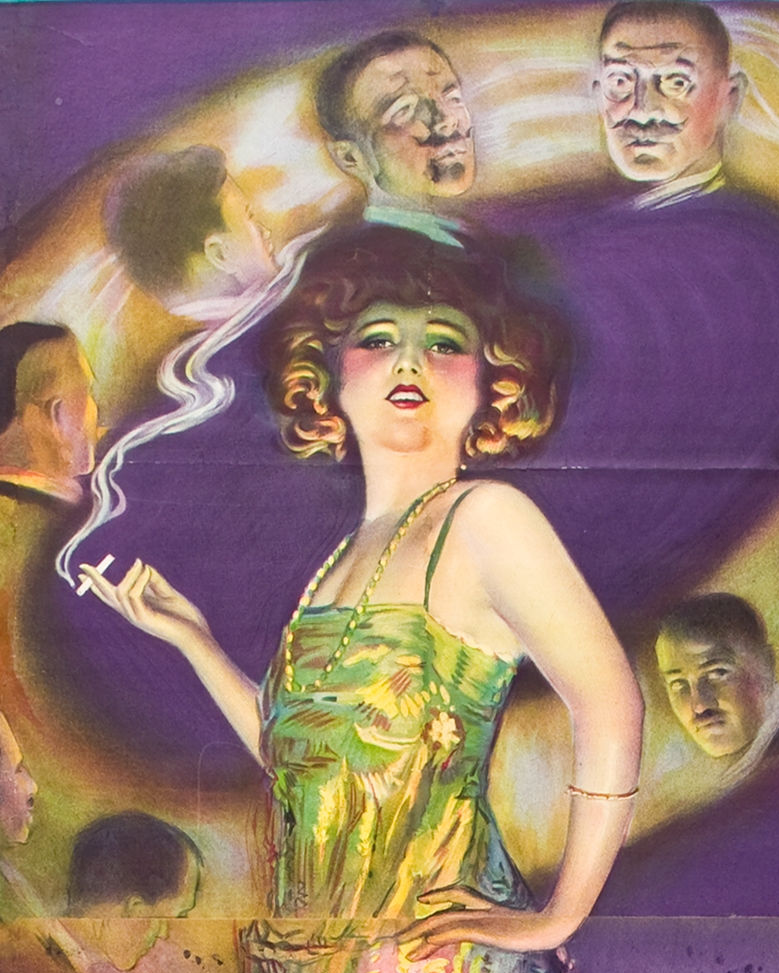
The Blonde Vampire 1922

=== Searcher ===
In October 1920 Mooers was enticed by St. Louis Cardinals owner, Warren Fuzzy Anderson to locate his nephew, Jimmy Anderson. Fuzzy Anderson was once a partner of Henry Ford. He handled foreign distribution for Ford Motor Company parts. He had no other close relatives to leave his wealth to aside from Jimmie, who left St. Louis, Missouri in 1918.

Mooers resided at the Canterbury Inn on Westlake Avenue in Los Angeles while she performed her investigation. She was promised a diamond necklace by the baseball owner if she could find Jimmie. The nephew was rumored to have relocated to Hollywood and become a stunt man in motion pictures.

== Death ==
In 1960 De Sacia Mooers died following a six-week illness in Hollywood Presbyterian Medical Center. She was seventy-two years old. Her residence was at 1523 North McCadden Place, Los Angeles.

== Partial filmography ==
- The Challenge (1922)
- The Blonde Vampire (1922)
- Potash and Perlmutter (1923)
- Restless Wives (1924)
- It Is the Law (1924)
- The Average Woman (1924)
- Any Woman (1925)
- Forbidden Waters (1926)
- Broadway Nights (1927)
- Lonesome Ladies (1927)
- Back to Liberty (1927)
- Tongues of Scandal (1927)
- By Whose Hand? (1927)
- Confessions of a Wife (1928)
- Shanghai Rose (1929)
- Just Off Broadway (1929)
- The Arizona Kid (1930)
