= East of Broadway =

1924 film

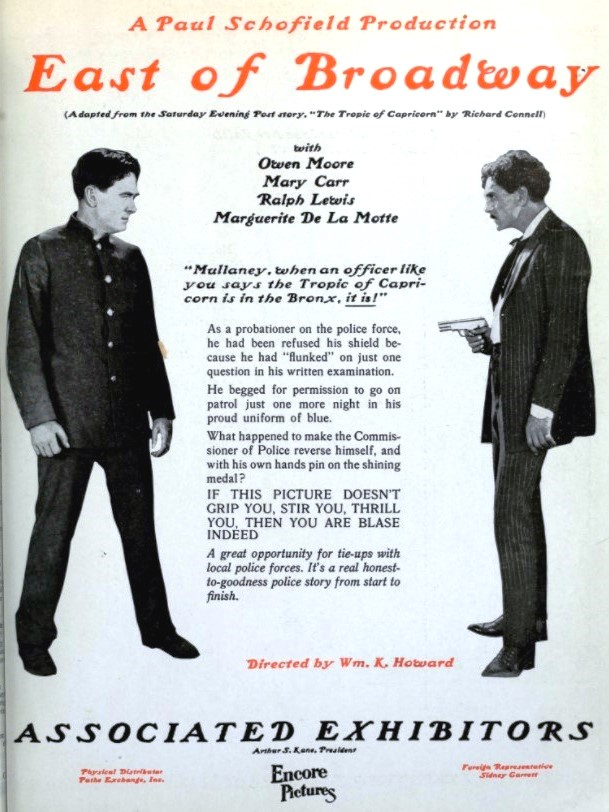
- Advertisement
- Directed by: William K. Howard
- Written by: Richard Connell (story); Paul Schofield
- Starring: Owen Moore; Marguerite De La Motte; Mary Carr.
- Cinematography: Lucien N. Andriot
- Production company: Encore Pictures
- Distributed by: Associated Exhibitors
- Release date: November 23, 1924
- Running time: 60 minutes
- Country: United States
- Language: Silent (English intertitles)

East of Broadway is a 1924 American silent comedy film directed by William K. Howard and starring Owen Moore, Marguerite De La Motte, and Mary Carr.

== Plot ==
As described in a review in a film magazine, Peter Mullaney, a typical boy of the poor section of New York’s East Side, longs to become a policeman. He goes to the training school but is turned down because he is not up to the standard of height, until he demonstrates his prowess by knocking down a big bully. The Commissioner who has high ideas of the necessary mental equipment to improve the force, gives him a chance if he rates high in the written examination. The question that stumps him is “Where is the Tropic of Capricorn.” He answers, in the Bronx. Turned, down, he begs permission to wear the uniform one night, in order not to disappoint his sweetheart Judy. His chance comes when burglars invade a house and shoot his friend Officer Gaffney. Peter knocks both out but lands in a hospital himself. When he recovers, the Commissioner pins a policeman’s shield on him and he declares his love for Judy.

== Cast ==
- Owen Moore as Peter Mullaney
- Marguerite De La Motte as Judy McNulty
- Mary Carr as Mrs. Morrisey
- Eddie Gribbon as Danny McCabe
- Francis McDonald as Professor Mario
- Betty Francisco as Diana Morgan
- George Nichols as Officer Gaffney
- Ralph Lewis as Commissioner

== Production ==
East of Broadway is based on the Richard Connell story "Where Is The Tropic of Capricorn?", which was originally published in The Saturday Evening Post. Production began in May 1924 under the original story title, and the master print was completed by August.

== Bibliography ==
- Munden, Kenneth White. The American Film Institute Catalog of Motion Pictures Produced in the United States, Part 1. University of California Press, 1997.
