= Wandering Daughters =

1923 film

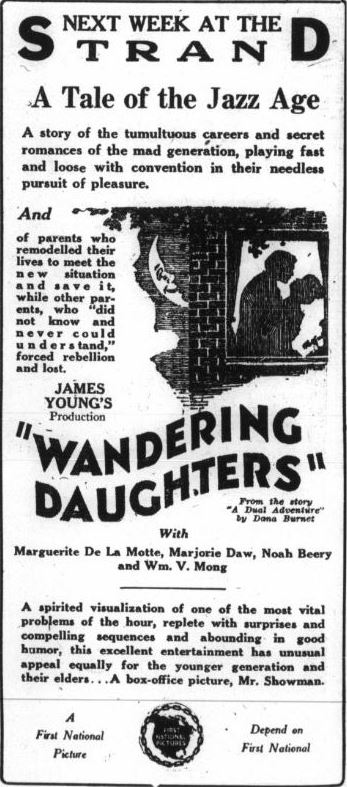
- Advertisement
- Directed by: James Young
- Screenplay by: James Young; Lenore Coffee
- Based on: Wandering Daughters by Dana Burnet
- Starring: Marguerite De La Motte; William V. Mong; Mabel Van Buren; Marjorie Daw
- Cinematography: Georges Benoît
- Production company: Sam E. Rork Productions
- Distributed by: Associated First National Pictures
- Release date: July 1, 1923
- Running time: 60 minutes
- Country: United States
- Language: Silent (English intertitles)

Wandering Daughters is a 1923 American comedy drama film directed by James Young and written by James Young and Lenore Coffee. The film stars Marguerite De La Motte, William V. Mong, Mabel Van Buren, Marjorie Daw, Noah Beery Sr., and Pat O'Malley. The film was released on July 1, 1923, by Associated First National Pictures.

== Cast ==
- Marguerite De La Motte as Bessie Bowden
- William V. Mong as Will Bowden
- Mabel Van Buren as Annie Bowden
- Marjorie Daw as Geraldine Horton
- Noah Beery Sr. as Charles Horton
- Pat O'Malley as John Hargraves
- Allan Forrest as Austin Trull
- Alice Howell as Bowden Servant
