= Affinities (film) =

1922 silent film

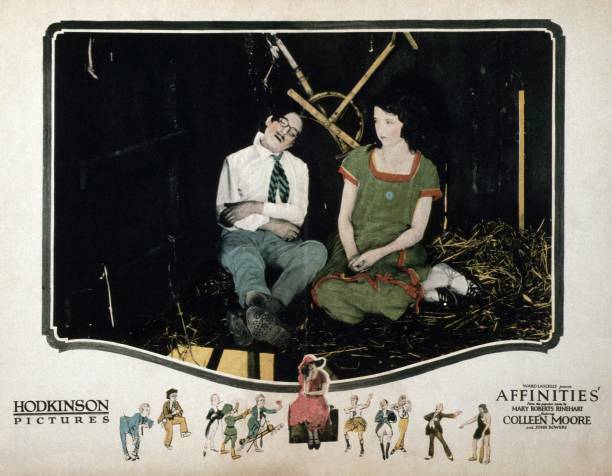
- Directed by: Ward Lascelle
- Written by: H. Landers Jackson; Mary Roberts Rinehart
- Produced by: Ward Lascelle
- Starring: John Bowers; Colleen Moore; Joe Bonner
- Cinematography: Abe Scholtz
- Production company: Ward Lascelle Productions
- Distributed by: Hodkinson Pictures
- Release date: September 24, 1922
- Running time: 60 minutes
- Country: United States
- Languages: Silent; English intertitles

Affinities is a lost 1922 American silent comedy drama film directed by Ward Lascelle and starring John Bowers, Colleen Moore and Joe Bonner.

== Cast ==
- John Bowers as Day Illington
- Colleen Moore as Fanny Illington
- Joe Bonner as Fred Jackson
- Grace Gordon as Ida Jackson
- Pietro Sosso as Professor Savage
- E.H. Calvert

== Preservation ==
With no holdings located in archives, Affinities is considered a lost film.

== Bibliography ==
- Munden, Kenneth White. The American Film Institute Catalog of Motion Pictures Produced in the United States, Part 1. University of California Press, 1997.
