= The Blonde Vampire =

1922 film

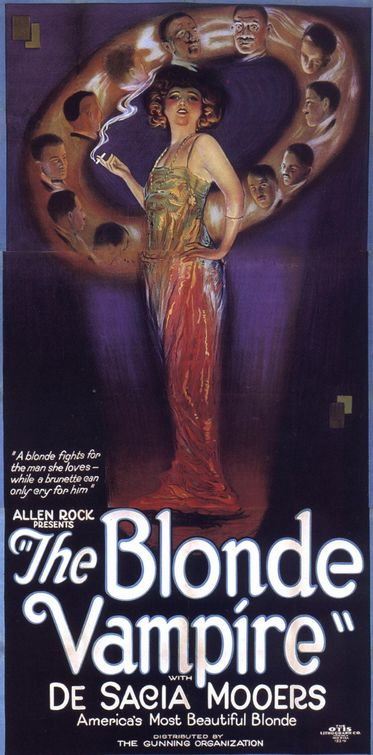
- Directed by: Wray Physioc
- Written by: Wray Physioc
- Produced by: Wray Bartlett Physioc
- Starring: De Sacia Mooers; Joseph W. Smiley; Miriam Battista
- Production company: Wray Physioc Company
- Distributed by: Film Booking Offices of America
- Release date: March 25, 1922
- Running time: 60 minutes
- Country: United States
- Languages: Silent; English intertitles

The Blonde Vampire is a 1922 American silent drama film directed by Wray Physioc and starring De Sacia Mooers, Joseph W. Smiley and Miriam Battista.

== Cast ==
- De Sacia Mooers as Marcia Saville
- Joseph W. Smiley as John Saville
- Charles Craig as Simon Downs
- Miriam Battista as Alice
- Robert Conville as Jimmy the Rat
- Edwin August as Martin Kent
- Frank Beamish as The Chief
- Mildred Wayne as Lou
- Alfred Barrett as Tom Smith, The Snapper

== Bibliography ==
- Munden, Kenneth White. The American Film Institute Catalog of Motion Pictures Produced in the United States, Part 1. University of California Press, 1997.
