= Paul Schofield (screenwriter) =

Paul Schofield (born c. 1895, in Norfolk, Virginia) was an American screenplay writer who worked on 44 films between 1920 and 1940, some directed by famous directors such as D. W. Griffith, John Ford, Archie Mayo, Frank Lloyd, and Herbert Brenon.

== Selected filmography ==
- Wells Fargo (1937) directed by Frank Lloyd
- Sunset Range (1935)
- La cruz y la espada (1934)
- Sensation Hunters (1933)
- Beau Ideal (1931) directed by Herbert Brenon
- Framed (1930)
- The College Widow (1927) directed by Archie Mayo
- Just Another Blonde (1926)
- Hearts and Fists (1926)
- Paradise (1926)
- The Song and Dance Man (1926) directed by Herbert Brenon
- Beau Geste (1926) directed by Herbert Brenon
- Fascinating Youth (1926)
- Bluebeard's Seven Wives (1926)
- That Royle Girl (1925) directed by D. W. Griffith and starring W. C. Fields
- The Street of Forgotten Men (1925) directed by Herbert Brenon and featuring Louise Brooks in her screen debut
- Coming Through (1925)
- East of Broadway (1924)
- The Unknown Purple (1923)
- The Fourth Musketeer (1923)
- Very Truly Yours (1922)
- West of Chicago (1922)
- Lights of the Desert (1922)
- The Last Trail (1921)
- The Lady from Longacre (1921)
- Just Pals (1920) directed by John Ford
