= Georges Benoît =

French cinematographer

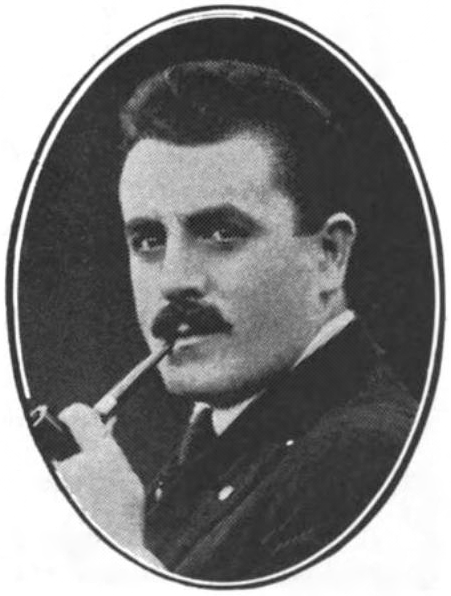
- Born: 27 November 1883; Paris, France
- Died: 1942 (aged 58–59)
- Occupations: Director; Cinematographer; Actor
- Years active: 1915–1942

Georges Benoît (27 November 1883 – 1942) was a French cinematographer who worked on more than sixty films during his career. During the silent era, he was employed mostly in Hollywood. Later he worked in his native France on films such as Jacques Tourneur's Departure (1931). Between 1929 and 1934 he appeared in approximately ten films as an actor.

Benoît also worked in Argentina where he directed the 1919 film Juan Sin Ropa and was cinematographer for the historical epic The Charge of the Gauchos (1928).

An early exponent of the tracking shot, his camerawork for Raoul Walsh’s first directorial effort has been recognized for its mobility.

== Selected filmography ==
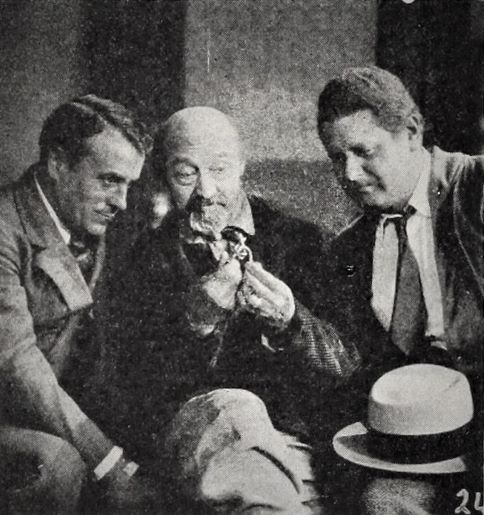
Georges Benoît (at right) with Dan Mason (center) and director Alan Hale on the set of Forbidden Waters (1926)

- Regeneration (1915)
- Carmen (1915)
- The Serpent (1916)
- Blue Blood and Red (1916)
- When False Tongues Speak (1917)
- Juan Sin Ropa (1919)
- The Wonder Man (1920)
- The Stealers (1920)
- The Little 'Fraid Lady (1920)
- What's a Wife Worth? (1921)
- Live and Let Live (1921)
- Omar the Tentmaker (1922)
- Wandering Daughters (1923)
- Trilby (1923)
- Welcome Stranger (1924) (as George Benoit)
- Why Get Married? (1924)
- Off the Highway (1925)
- Stop Flirting (1925)
- A Lover's Oath (1925)
- The Prairie Pirate (1925)
- The Danger Girl (1926)
- West of Broadway (1926)
- Pals in Paradise (1926)
- The Speeding Venus (1926)
- Forbidden Waters (1926)
- The Danger Girl (1926)
- No Control (1927)
- The Wagon Show (1928)
- The Charge of the Gauchos (1928)
- Captain Fracasse (1929)
- Departure (1931)
- In the Name of the Law (1932)
- Panurge (1932)
- The Two Orphans (1933)
- The Uncle from Peking (1934)
- Your Smile (1934)
- Sidonie Panache (1934)
- Return to Paradise (1935)
- Justin de Marseille (1935)
- The Secret of Polichinelle (1936)
- Let's Make a Dream (1936)
- Temptation (1936)
- My Father Was Right (1936)
- The Baker's Wife (1938)
- Yahya el hub (1938)
- The New Rich (1938)
- Promise to a Stranger (1942)
- The Snow on the Footsteps (1942)

== Bibliography ==
- Finkielman, Jorge. The Film Industry in Argentina: An Illustrated Cultural History. McFarland, 2003.
- Fujiwara, Chris. Jacques Tourneur: The Cinema of Nightfall. McFarland, 1998.
