= Ragtime (1927 film) =

1927 film

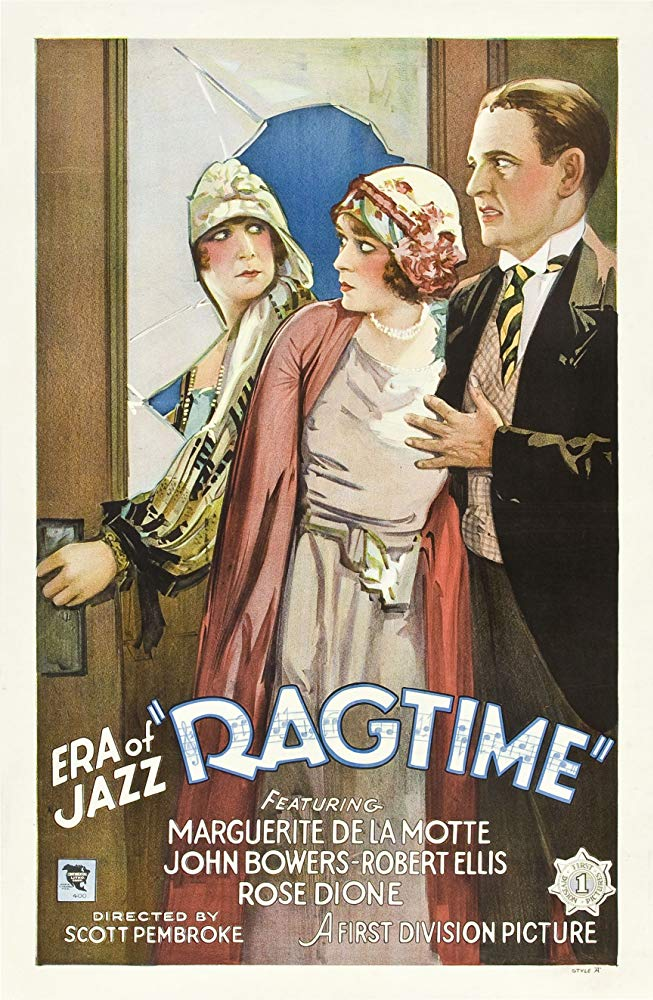
- Directed by: Scott Pembroke
- Written by: George Dromgold; Joseph A. Mitchell; Jean Plannette
- Produced by: James Ormont
- Starring: John Bowers; Marguerite De La Motte; Robert Ellis
- Cinematography: Ernest Miller; Ted Tetzlaff
- Production company: James Ormont Productions
- Distributed by: First Division Pictures
- Release date: September 1, 1927
- Running time: 70 minutes
- Country: United States
- Languages: Silent; English intertitles

Ragtime is a 1927 American silent drama film directed by Scott Pembroke and starring John Bowers, Marguerite De La Motte and Robert Ellis. It is considered lost.

== Synopsis ==
It portrays the romance between a Tin Pan Alley songwriter and a high society girl.

== Cast ==
- John Bowers as Ted Mason
- Marguerite De La Motte as Beth Barton
- Robert Ellis as Steve Martin, aka 'Slick'
- Rose Dione as Yvonne Martin, aka 'Goldie'
- William H. Strauss as Max Ginsberg
- Kate Bruce as Mrs. Mason

== Bibliography ==
- Munden, Kenneth White. The American Film Institute Catalog of Motion Pictures Produced in the United States, Part 1. University of California Press, 1997.
