= Daughters Who Pay =

1925 film

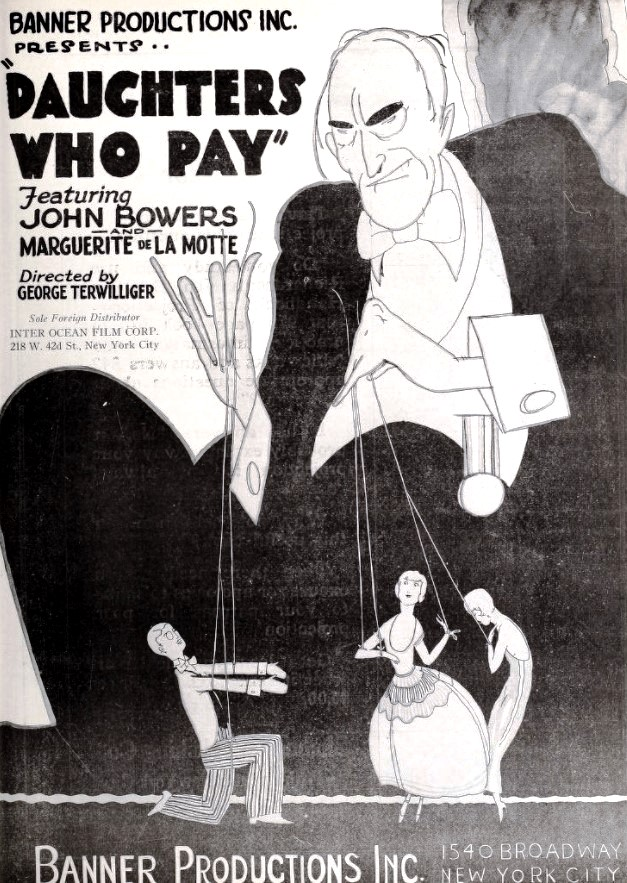
- Advertisement
- Directed by: George Terwilliger
- Written by: William B. Laub
- Starring: Marguerite De La Motte; John Bowers; J. Barney Sherry; Bela Lugosi
- Cinematography: Edward Paul; Murphy Darling; Charles J. Davis
- Distributed by: Banner Productions
- Release date: May 10, 1925
- Running time: 6 reels
- Country: United States
- Language: Silent (English intertitles)

Daughters Who Pay is a 1925 American silent drama film directed by George Terwilliger, starring Marguerite De La Motte and John Bowers, and featuring Bela Lugosi as Serge Romonsky.

== Plot ==
Margaret Smith attempts to save her brother by visiting Henry Foster, from whom her brother stole, but Foster refuses leniency. Sonia Borisoff, a Broadway dancer, visits Foster with the offer that she will break her engagement with Dick Foster, the son of the wealthy man, if Margaret's brother is given a pardon. He accepts. In the presence of a crowd of Russian Reds, Sonia makes love to their leader when Dick appears. He is indignant, but Sonia then insults the Communist leader after Dick leaves. The Reds lure her to a lonely house where they plan to kill her, but Dick intervenes. Some of the Reds again corner her in her apartment, but secret service men arrest them. Margaret and Sonia are then revealed to be the same young woman and to be an agent of the secret service. She and Dick then wed.

== Cast ==
- Marguerite De La Motte as Sonia Borisoff / Margaret Smith
- John Bowers as Dick Foster
- J. Barney Sherry as Henry Foster
- Bela Lugosi as Serge Romonsky
- Marie Schaefer as Aunt Mary (credited as Marie Shaffer)
- Joseph Striker as Larry Smith

== Preservation ==
A print of Daughters Who Pay exists at George Eastman House.

== See also ==
- Béla Lugosi filmography
