= Pals in Paradise =

1926 film

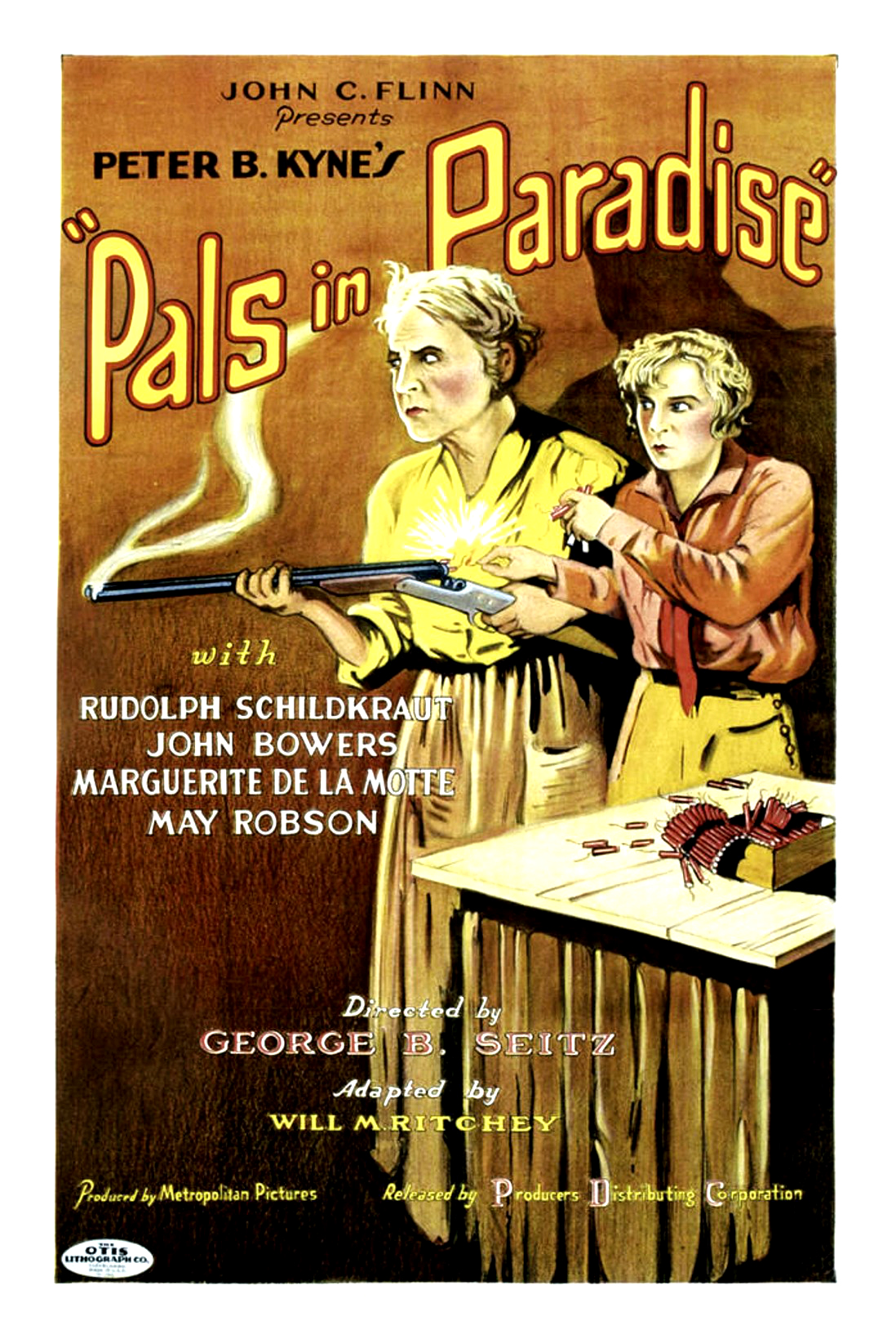
- Film poster
- Directed by: George B. Seitz
- Written by: Peter B. Kyne
- Produced by: John C. Flinn
- Starring: Rudolph Schildkraut
- Cinematography: Georges Benoît
- Distributed by: Producers Distributing Corporation(PDC)
- Release date: November 22, 1926
- Running time: 70 minutes
- Country: United States
- Language: Silent (English intertitles)

Pals in Paradise is a 1926 American silent western comedy film directed by George B. Seitz. The film was shot in Europe.

== Plot ==
As described in a film magazine review, Bill Harvey comes across an old mine claim and discovers the grave of the owner, whose rights to the claim have lapsed. Bill settles in and calls the place Paradise. To paradise come Abie and Esther along with their equipment to start a general store in a small western town. They open their store and Abie and Bill become fast friends. Esther, however, is the boss of the store. She becomes a staunch follower of Jerry Howard, who arrives in Paradise to recover her father's claim to the old mine. Bill refuses to give it up so Jerry and Esther take sides against Bill and Abie. There is a good deal of comedy related to Esther's stand. A trio of crooks arrive and plan to rob Bill of his gold. They fail, and Jerry and Bill marry while Ester and Abie make up.

== Cast ==
- Rudolph Schildkraut as Abraham Lezinsky
- John Bowers as Bill Harvey
- Marguerite De La Motte as Geraldine 'Jerry' Howard
- May Robson as Esther Lezinsky
- Alan Brooks as John Kenton
- Ernie Adams as Butterfly Kid
- Bruce Gordon as Gentleman Phil

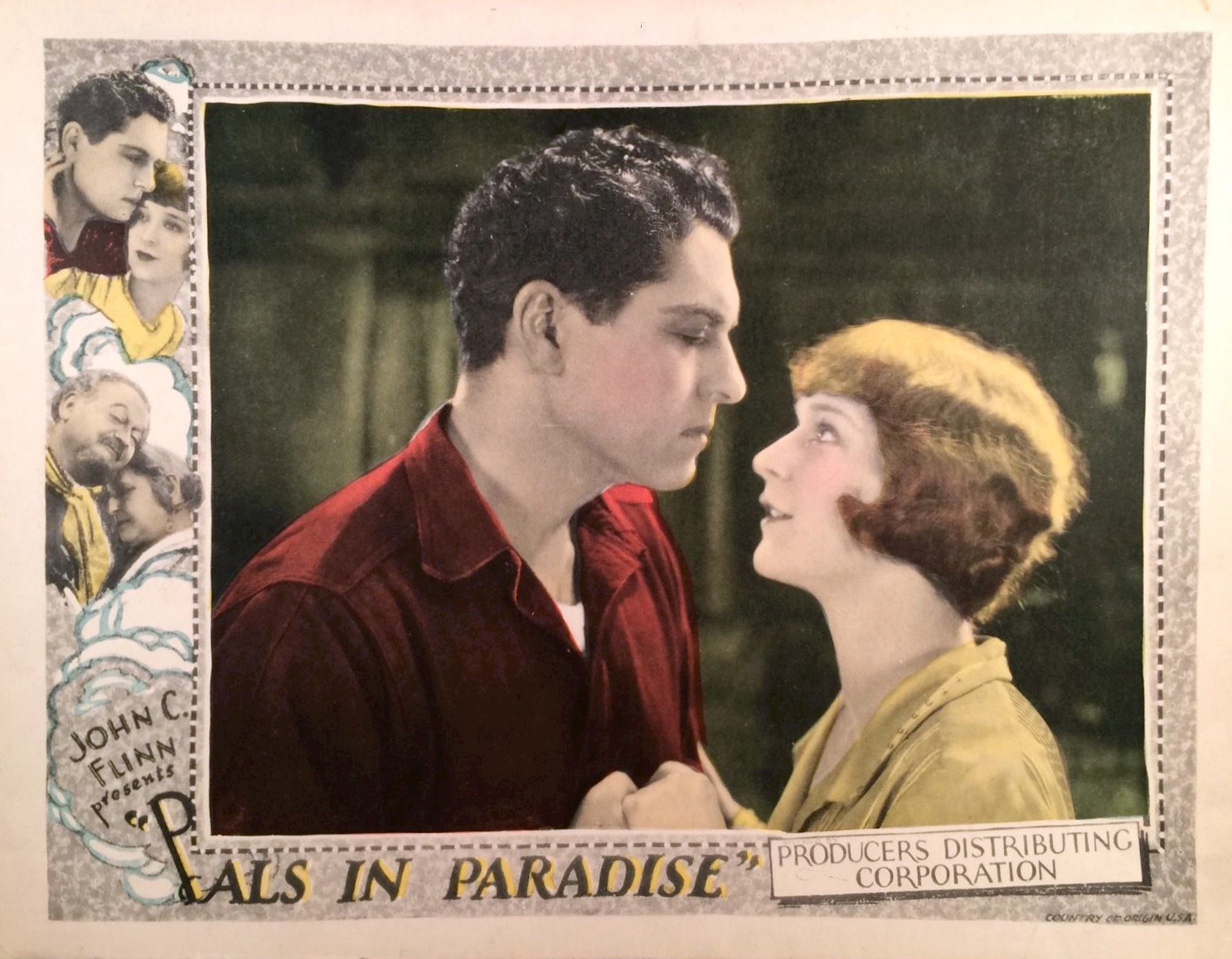
Lobby card

== Preservation ==
Witn no prints of Pals in Paradise located in any film archives, it is a lost film.
