= The Jilt =

1922 film

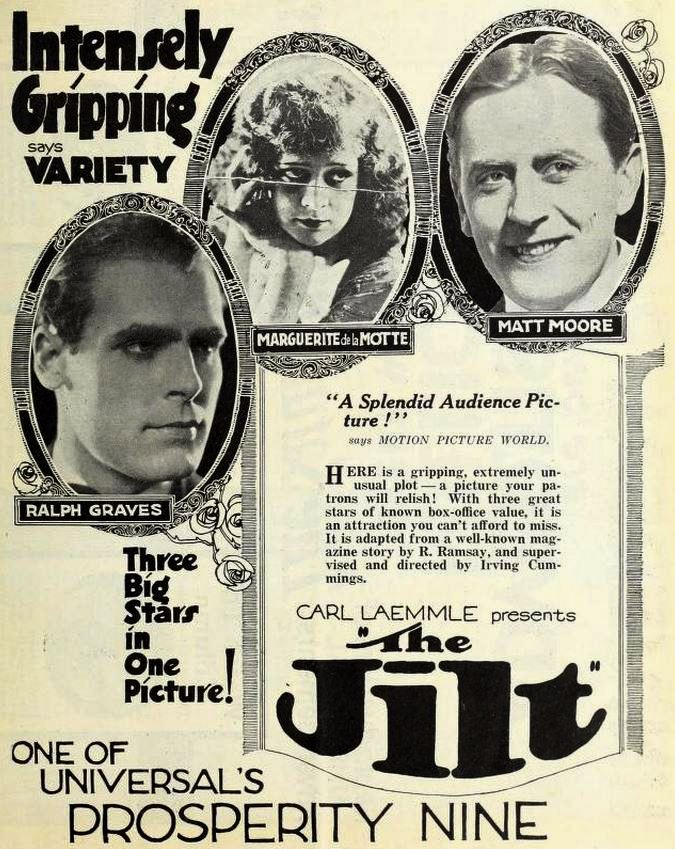
- Directed by: Irving Cummings
- Written by: Arthur F. Statter
- Story by: R. Ramsey
- Produced by: Carl Laemmle
- Starring: Marguerite De La Motte; Ralph Graves; Matt Moore
- Cinematography: William Marshall
- Production company: Universal Film Manufacturing Company
- Distributed by: Universal Film Manufacturing Company
- Release date: November 13, 1922
- Running time: 50 minutes
- Country: United States
- Language: Silent (English intertitles)

The Jilt is a 1922 American silent drama film directed by Irving Cummings and starring Marguerite De La Motte, Ralph Graves, and Matt Moore.

== Plot ==
As described in a film magazine, Rose Trenton has mistaken pity for love and become engaged to George Prothero, a blinded and cynical hero of World War I. Gradually the truth dawns upon her and she faces the task of telling a naturally suspicious and jealous man that she does not love him, and without letting him think that it is because of his eyes that she is breaking their engagement. After hearing of an eye specialist in Paris who could possibly operate and restore George's sight, she writes to him. On the next day she finds that her nerve is strong and tells George of her mistake in promising to marry him. He is hurt, bitter, and seemingly resigned. "I shall go to Europe and forget," he says and goes at once. Two months later, Sandy Sanderson returns from the war and Europe. His picture once stood across from George's on Rose's dresser, and he is received with ardent strong feelings by Rose, almost an admission that she loves him. Unexpectedly, the blind man also returns. He and Sandy, old friends, greet each other cordially and chum about together.

Then one day they leave on a trip together, and Rose, in fear for some unknown reason, watches for their return. George comes alone, being helped by an unknown man, telling a tale of how Sandy was blackjacked while he, being blind, could not help. At that time, the mail arrives with a letter from Europe which Rose opens automatically and then screams. It details how the French surgeon had restored George's sight weeks before. George reads it and shouts, "It's a lie!" With this absurd denial, Rose sees that the man is not sightless in a physical sense, only morally and mentally. Later, the hand of Fate brings back Sandy, who was not killed but injured, to Rose.

== Cast ==
- Marguerite De La Motte as Rose Trenton
- Ralph Graves as Sandy Sanderson
- Matt Moore as George Prothero
- Ben Hewlett as Protheoro's Secretary
- Harry De Vere as Mr. Trenton
- Elinor Hancock as Mrs. Trenton

== Preservation ==
No copies of The Jilt are listed as held in any film archives, making it a lost film.

== Bibliography ==
- Munden, Kenneth White. The American Film Institute Catalog of Motion Pictures Produced in the United States, Part 1. University of California Press, 1997.
