= Fifth Avenue (film) =

1926 film

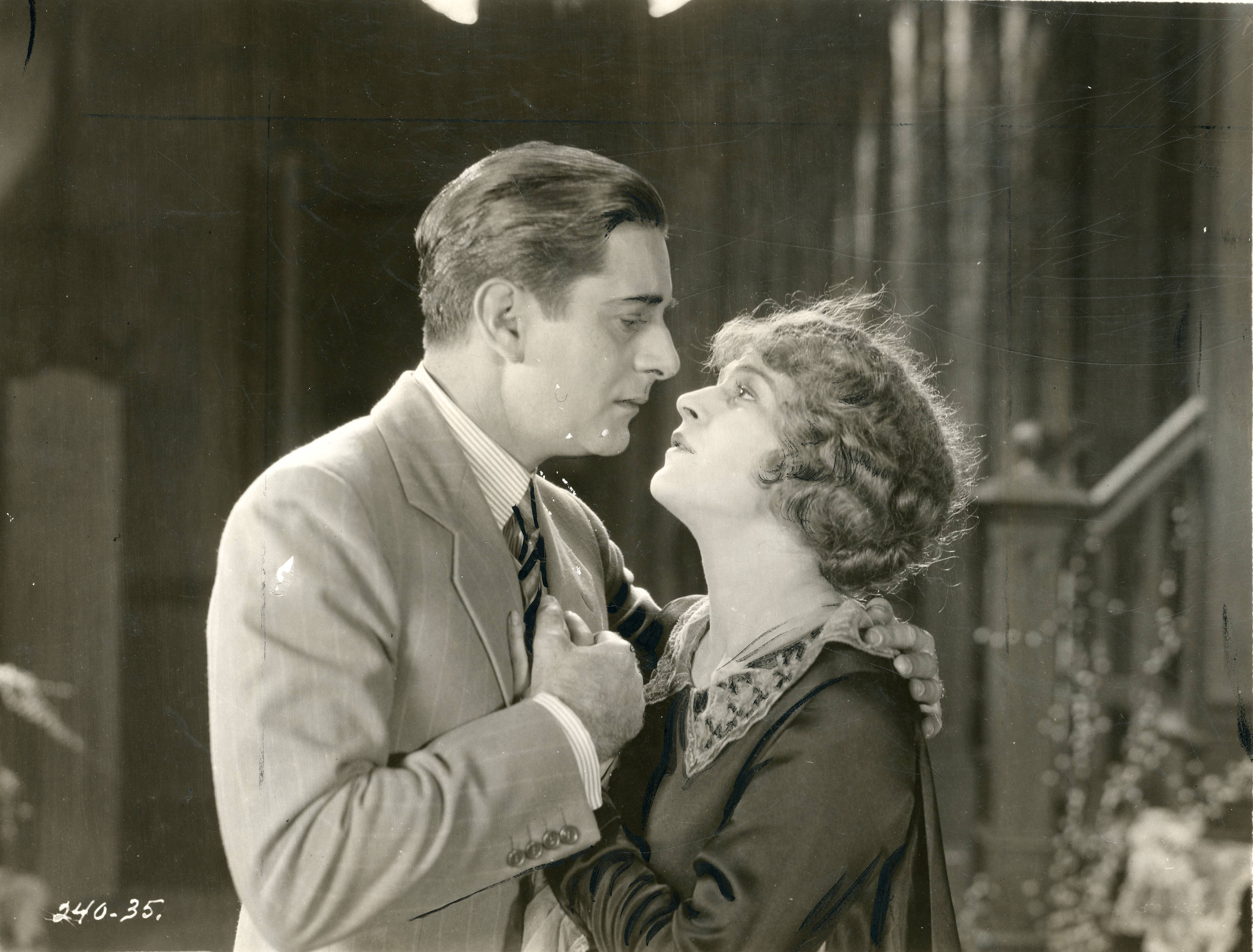
- Still with Allan Forrest and Marguerite De La Motte
- Directed by: Robert G. Vignola
- Written by: Anthony Coldeway; Fanny Hatton; Frederic Hatton
- Starring: Marguerite De La Motte; Allan Forrest; Louise Dresser
- Cinematography: James Van Trees
- Production company: Belasco Productions
- Distributed by: Producers Distributing Corporation
- Release date: January 24, 1926
- Running time: 6 reels
- Country: United States
- Language: Silent (English intertitles)

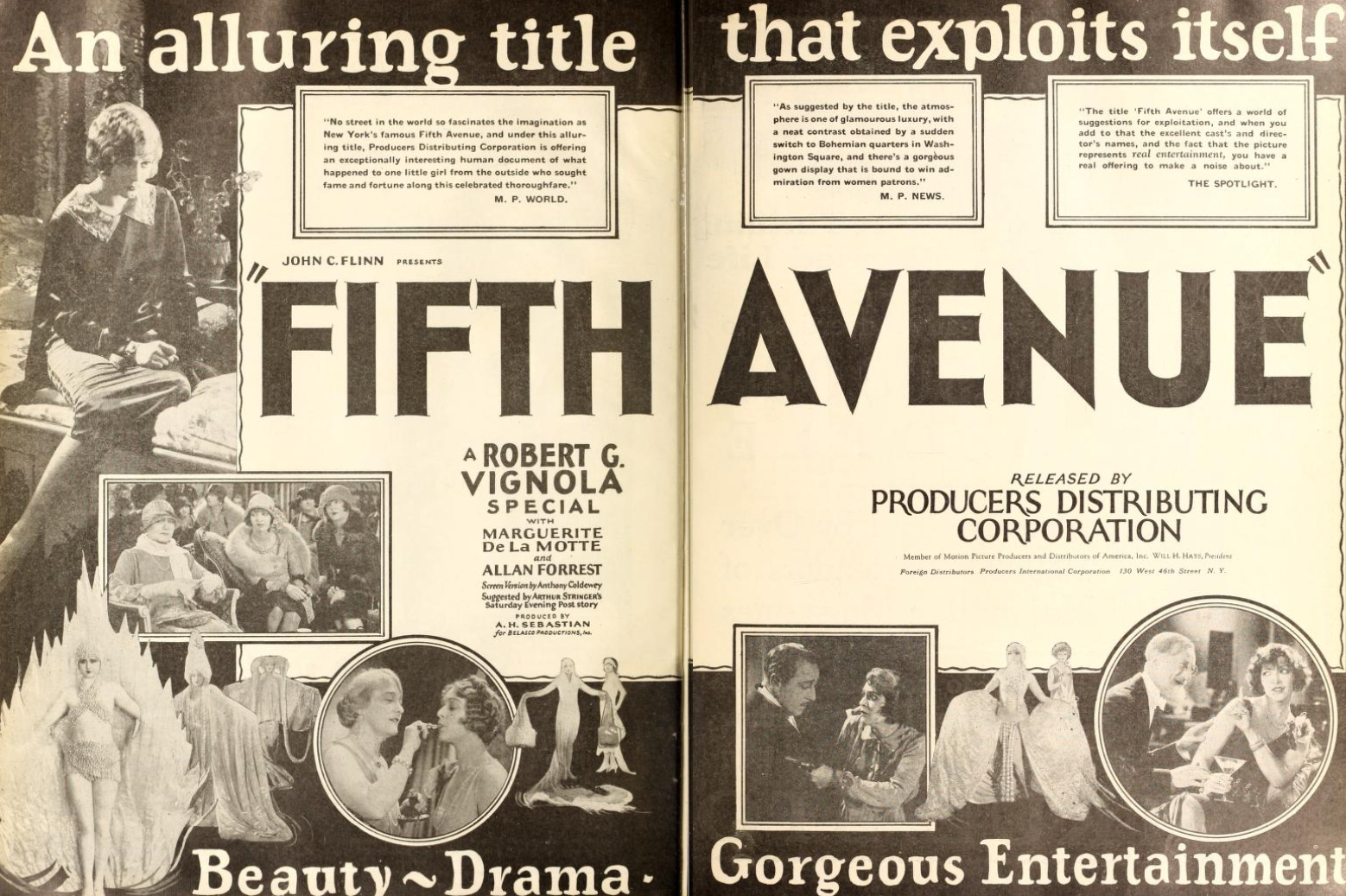
Fifth Avenue ad in Motion Picture News, 1926

Fifth Avenue is a lost 1926 American silent drama film directed by Robert G. Vignola and starring Marguerite De La Motte, Allan Forrest, and Louise Dresser.

== Plot ==
As described in a film magazine review, Barbara Pelham, a young woman who arrives in New York City from the South to obtain an advance on her father’s cotton crop, is lured into staying at a disorderly house. It is here that Peter Heffner, the broker from whom she sought a loan, makes unwelcome advances to her. She flees the house just prior to it being raided by the police. Later she meets Neil Heffner, the son of the broker. A friendship that ripens to love forms between the young people. The young man’s father tries to discredit the young woman by calling her a prostitute, but her name is cleared by an explanation by Mrs. Kemp, who was the keeper of the resort.

== Cast ==
- Marguerite De La Motte as Barbara Pelham
- Allan Forrest as Neil Heffner
- Louise Dresser as Claudine Kemp
- William V. Mong as Peter Heffner
- Crauford Kent as Allan Trainor
- Lucille Lee Stewart as Natalie Van Loon
- Anna May Wong as Nan Lo
- Lillian Langdon as Mrs. Van Loon
- Josephine Norman as Greenwich Village Girl
- Sally Long as Greenwich Village Girl
- Flora Finch as Mrs. Pettygrew
- Rolfe Sedan as Bit Role (uncredited)

== Preservation ==
With no prints of Fifth Avenue located in any film archives, it is a lost film.

== Bibliography ==
- Munden, Kenneth White. The American Film Institute Catalog of Motion Pictures Produced in the United States, Part 1. University of California Press, 1997.
