= Arizona (1918 film) =

1918 silent film drama

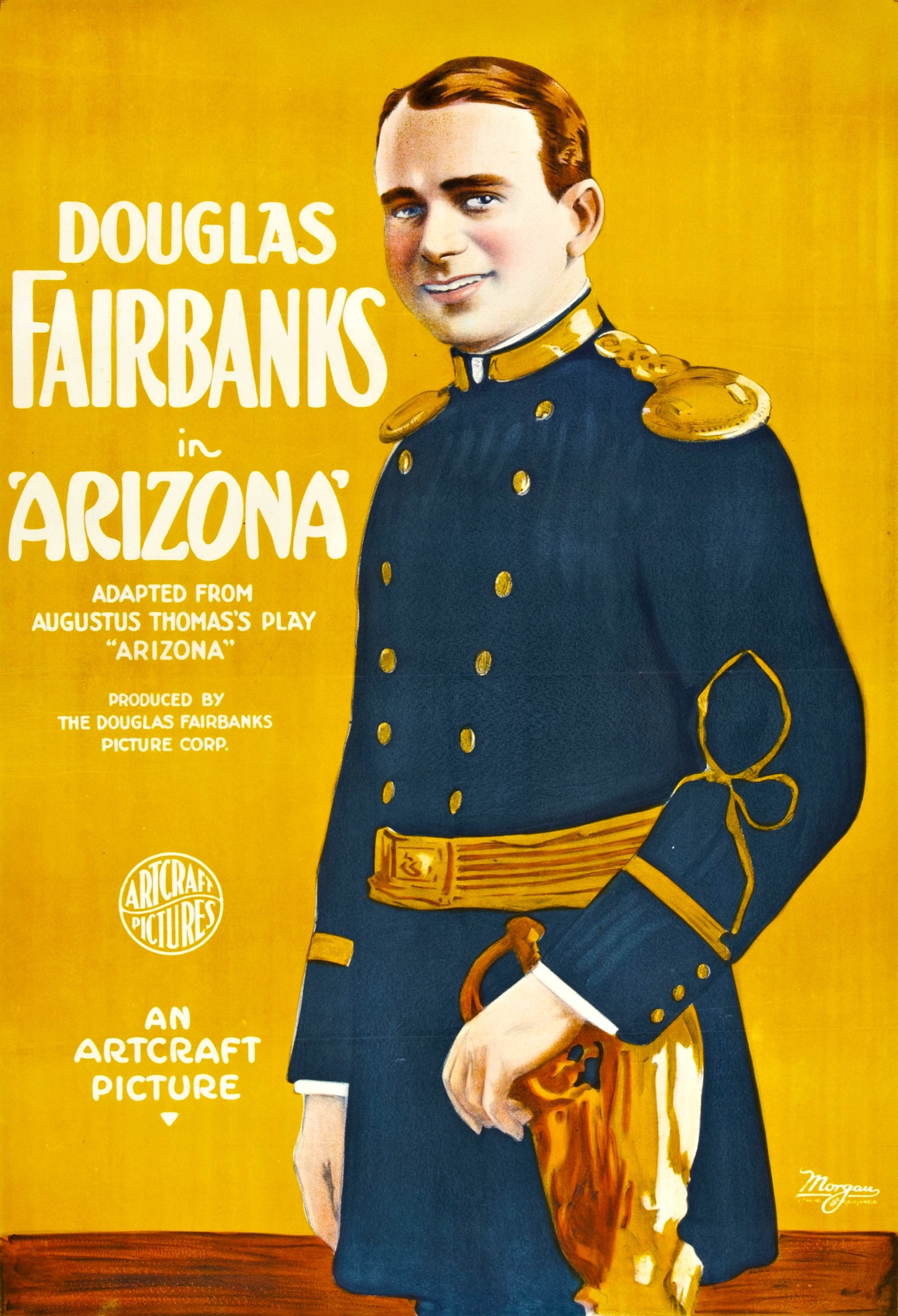
- Lobby poster
- Directed by: Albert Parker
- Screenplay by: Theodore Reed
- Based on: Arizona by Augustus Thomas
- Produced by: Douglas Fairbanks
- Starring: Douglas Fairbanks
- Cinematography: Hugh C. McClung; Glen MacWilliams
- Edited by: William Shea
- Production company: Douglas Fairbanks Pictures Corp.
- Distributed by: Artcraft Pictures
- Release date: December 8, 1918
- Running time: 5 reels (4,213 feet)
- Country: United States
- Language: Silent (English intertitles)

Arizona is a 1918 American silent melodrama film produced by and starring Douglas Fairbanks and released by Famous Players–Lasky under its Artcraft Pictures banner. Based on the successful 1899 play of the same name by Augustus Thomas, the film was directed by Albert Parker.

Despite mixed reviews and its release near the end of the Spanish flu epidemic, the film prospered at the box office largely on the strength of its star's drawing power.

Arizona is presumed lost.

== Plot ==
Denton is a lieutenant in the U.S. Cavalry regiment commanded by Colonel Benham. Benham is married to the much younger Estrella, the daughter of wealthy rancher Canby. Estrella has a sister, Bonita, with whom Denton falls in love.

Denton discovers an affair between Estrella and Captain Hodgeman. In his effort to break up the affair, Denton follows Estrella to her room where Benham catches them and misunderstands what he sees. Denton honorably keeps Estrella's secret and in consequence must resign in disgrace.

Canby hires Denton as foreman of his ranch. Denton's relationship with Bonita is endangered by Hodgeman who lies to Canby about him. Hodgeman's grudge against Denton leads to a fight between the two during which Hodgeman is shot and mortally wounded. Denton is suspected, but a cowboy, Tony, declares that he fired the shot to retaliate for Hodgeman's dealings with the girl that he loves. In the end, Estrella reveals the truth about her own indiscretion, enabling Denton and Bonita to marry with her family's blessing as well as a happy ending for Benham and Estrella.

== Cast ==
- Douglas Fairbanks as Lieutenant Denton
- Theodore Roberts as Canby
- Kate Price as Mrs. Canby
- Frederick Burton as Colonel Benham
- Harry S. Northrup as Captain Hodgeman
- Frank Campeau as Kellar
- Kathleen Kirkham as Estrella
- Marjorie Daw as Bonita
- Marguerite De La Motte as Lena
- Raymond Hatton as Tony
- Robert Boulder as Doctor
- Albert MacQuarrie as Lieutenant Hatton
- Katherine Griffith
- Ernest Butterworth

== Production ==
The source material for the film was the enormously successful play of the same name, first staged in 1899 and credited with launching the trend for Western-themed plays. Some of the cast recruited for the film were also associated with the play: Theodore Roberts originated the role of Canby on the stage; Frank Campeau was well known for portraying Tony.

Allan Dwan had directed Fairbanks in several successful pictures since signing with Fairbanks' studio in 1917; he was slated to direct Arizona as well, but in mid-production Dwan departed the picture and the Fairbanks company. Recently signed by Fairbanks to direct, Albert Parker took over direction of Arizona. The extent of Dwan's contribution, and how much remained in the final film, is not known; advertisements for the movie do not mention a director and contemporary reviews only name Parker.

Besides directorial troubles, other issues likely interfered with the production of Arizona. Fairbanks was active in the war effort and production was interrupted by his participation in a Liberty Loan drive that took him to Washington, D.C., New York City, and several cities across the South. The Spanish flu epidemic caused a four-week suspension of production on 60 percent of California films and may also have disrupted Arizona.

Exteriors were filmed in Arizona.

This was the first film to use a script supervisor, at the time known as a continuity girl. Sarah Y. Mason invented the craft of film continuity while working for director Albert Parker.

== Release ==
Arizona was released in December 1918 and fared well at the box office overall. At the time of its release, theaters around the U.S. were just beginning to reopen after forced closures due to the Spanish flu epidemic.

Many reviews focused on the effect Fairbanks had on the well-known material; some were favorable. The New York Times observed: "'Arizona' in the hands of some other actor might have become just another screen melodrama ... but with Fairbanks in the leading role, it has become an enjoyable comedy in which the athletic stunts of the star play a conspicuous and entertaining ... part." The Variety review repeated this opinion almost word for word. The review in The Billboard offered a similar point of view and added that the audience "echoed with spontaneous laughter in response to the energetic portrayal".

P. S. Harrison of Motion Picture News and Edward Weitzel of Moving Picture World were less complimentary. Harrison opined that when Fairbanks attempted heavy drama, both "the actor's ability to entertain and the dignity of the drama [suffer]". Weitzel found Fairbanks' characterization of Denton lacking: "The athletic star has, as usual, put his own personality into the picture, and acts Douglas Fairbanks with his customary life-like perfection." Wid's Daily rated elements of the picture as "fair", "unobjectionable", and "nothing to brag about", and called the star "same old Doug"; only the supporting cast, Roberts in particular, was judged "first-rate". Even so, the reviews were positive as to the film's drawing power due to its star.

== See also ==
- List of lost films
