= John Hughes (art director) =

American art director

- Born: May 23, 1882; Kansas City, Missouri
- Died: October 2, 1954 (aged 72); Los Angeles, California
- Occupation: Art director
- Years active: 1921–1951

John Hughes (May 23, 1882 – October 2, 1954) was an American art director. He was nominated for three Academy Awards in the category Best Art Direction. He worked on more than 90 films between 1921 and 1951. He was born in Missouri and died in Los Angeles, California.

== Selected filmography ==
- Passion Fruit (1921)
- Youth to Youth (1922)
- June Madness (1922)
- Desire (1923)
- A Boy of Flanders (1924)
- Little Robinson Crusoe (1924)
- A Fool's Awakening (1924)
- The Marriage Whirl (1925)
- The Cruise of the Jasper B (1926)
- The Girl in the Glass Cage (1929)
- Weary River (1929)
- The Naughty Flirt (1930)
- Misbehaving Ladies (1931)
- Party Husband (1931)
- The Reckless Hour (1931)
- The Cohens and Kellys in Hollywood (1932)
- Sherlock Holmes (1932)
- Midnight Alibi (1934)
- Harold Teen (1934)
- The Case of the Howling Dog (1934)
- Kansas City Princess (1934)
- Go Into Your Dance (1935)
- The Petrified Forest (1936)
- The Dawn Patrol (1938)
- Daughters Courageous (1939)
- No Time for Comedy (1940)
- They Drive by Night (1940)
- Castle on the Hudson (1940)
- They Died with Their Boots On (1941)
- The Adventures of Mark Twain (1944)
- Hotel Berlin (1945)
- God Is My Co-Pilot (1945)
- Escape in the Desert (1945)
- Rhapsody in Blue (1945)
- Cinderella Jones (1946)
- Night and Day (1946)
- The Treasure of the Sierra Madre (1948)
- Look for the Silver Lining (1949)
- One Last Fling (1949)
- The Thing from Another World (1951)

== Awards ==
Hughes was nominated for three Academy Awards for Best Art Direction:

- Sergeant York (1941)
- This Is the Army (1943)
- The Adventures of Mark Twain (1944)
