= By Whose Hand? (1927 film) =

1927 film

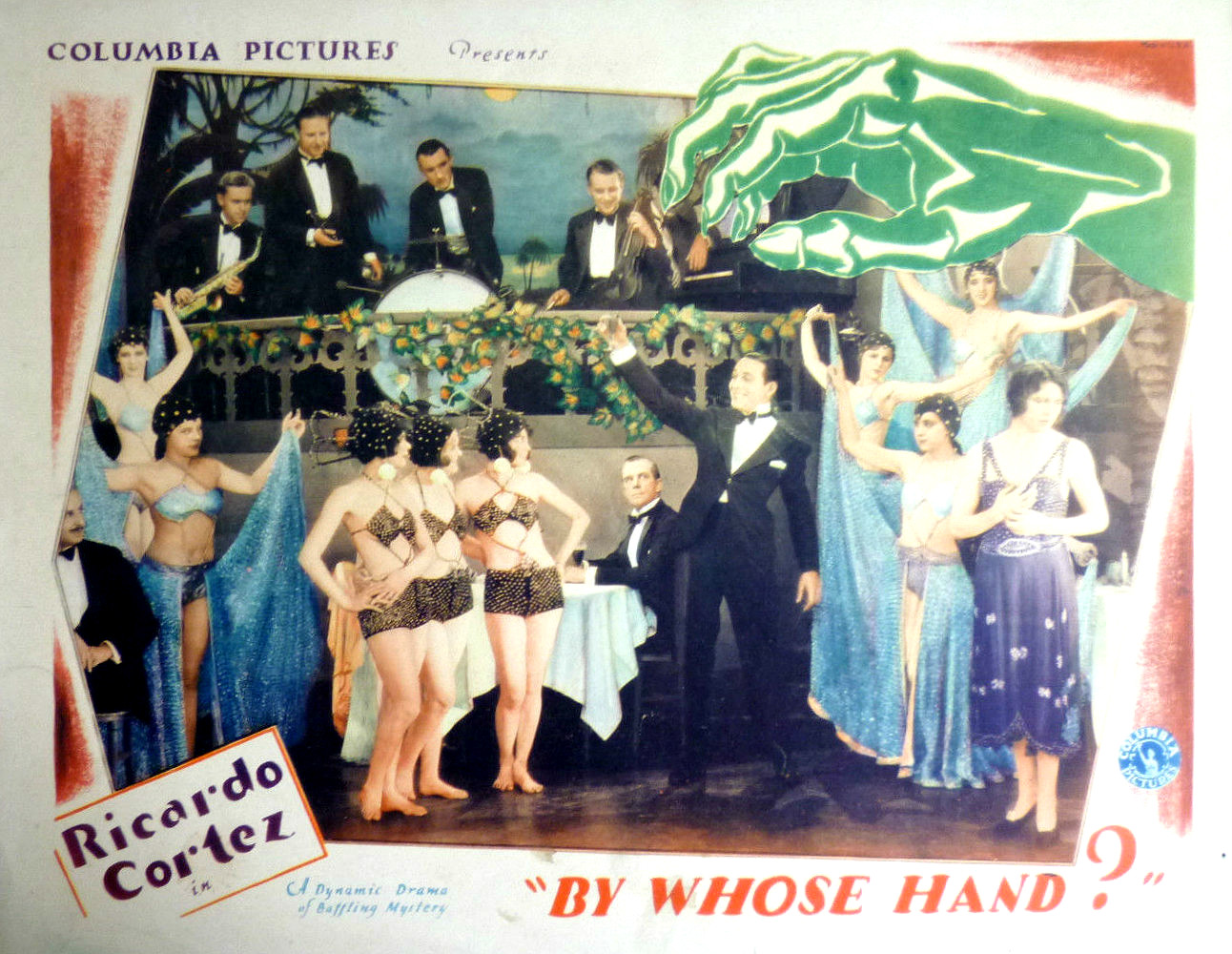
- Lobby card
- Directed by: Walter Lang
- Written by: Marion Orth
- Starring: Ricardo Cortez
- Cinematography: J.O. Taylor
- Distributed by: Columbia Pictures
- Release date: September 15, 1927
- Running time: 57 minutes
- Country: United States
- Language: Silent (English intertitles)

By Whose Hand? is a lost 1927 American silent crime drama film directed by Walter Lang and released by Columbia Pictures. Filmed before as a silent directed by James Durkin in 1916. An early talkie remake was made in 1932 by Benjamin Stoloff.

== Cast ==
- Ricardo Cortez as Agent X-9
- Eugenia Gilbert as Peg Hewlett
- Jack Baston as Sidney (as J. Thornton Baaston)
- Tom Dugan as Rollins
- Blue Washington as Eli
- Lillian Leighton as Silly McShane
- William Scott as 'Society Charlie'
- John Steppling as Claridge
- De Sacia Mooers as Tex
