= John Bowers (actor) =

American actor (1885–1936)

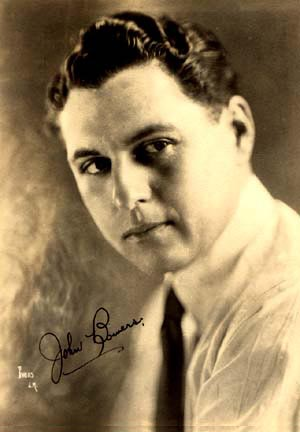
- Publicity photo of Bowers (1921)
- Born: John E. Bowersox; December 25, 1885; Garrett, Indiana, U.S.
- Died: November 17, 1936 (aged 50); Santa Monica, California, U.S
- Occupation: Actor
- Years active: 1914–1931
- Spouses: Beulah Poynter (?-?); Marguerite De La Motte (1924–1936)

John Bowers (born John E. Bowersox; December 25, 1885 – November 17, 1936) was an American stage and silent film actor who starred in 94 films including several short subjects. He has been identified as being an inspiration for the character Norman Maine in A Star Is Born (1937).

== Early life and career ==
Born John E. Bowersox in Garrett, Indiana, to George and Ida Bowersox, John Bowers attended Huntington Business College in Huntington, Indiana, where he became interested in acting. He joined a stock stage group and traveled until he landed in New York City in 1912, where he appeared in Broadway productions. Bowers began his film career in 1914. Within five years, he became one of the most popular leading men. During his career he co-starred frequently with Marguerite De La Motte, whom he later married.

Like many silent film stars, Bowers saw his career collapse when talkies became the standard.

== Death ==
On November 17, 1936, Bowers heard that his old friend Henry Hathaway was directing Gary Cooper in Souls at Sea on and off the shore of Santa Catalina. The 50-year-old actor rented a 16-foot sloop and sailed to the island, hoping to land a part in the picture, only to learn that it had already been cast. He never returned to shore, and his body was found on the beach at Santa Monica, California. Chuck Palahniuk claims folk legend dictates John simply walked into the ocean upon hearing this news.

His life, and particularly his death, is identified as inspiration for the character Norman Maine in A Star Is Born (1937). That character was also based on Norman Kerry.

For his contributions to the film industry, Bowers received a motion pictures star on the Hollywood Walk of Fame at 1709 Vine Street in 1960.

== Selected filmography ==
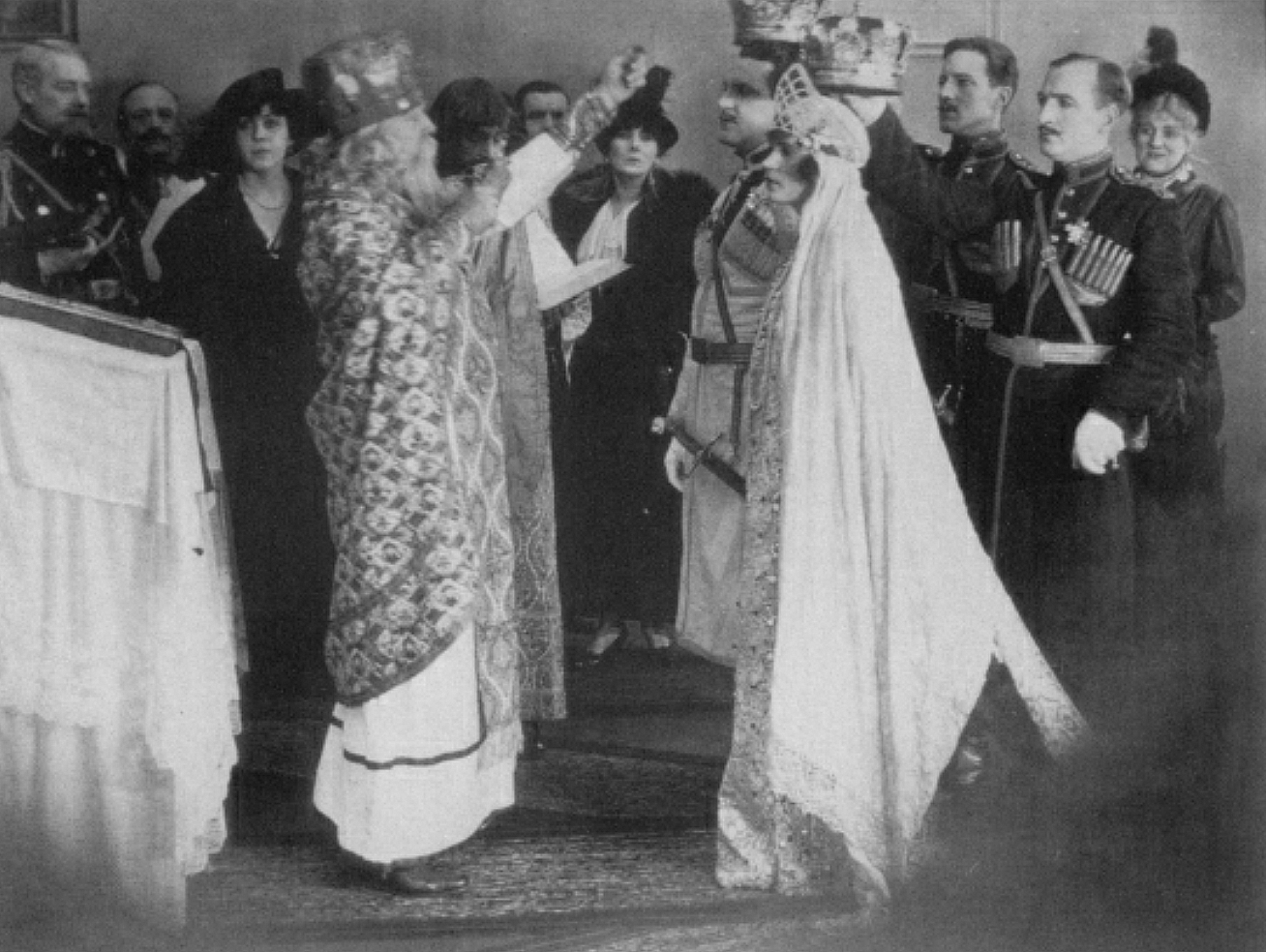
Bowers with Alice Brady in Darkest Russia

Year	Title	Role	Notes
1914	The Baited Trap	Blondie	
1914	In the Days of the Thundering Herd	Dick Madison	
1915	The Woman Pays	John Langton	credited as John E. Bowers
1916	Madame X	Monsieur Floriot	
1916	Destiny's Toy	Reverend Robert Carter	
1917	Darkest Russia	Alexis Nazimoff	
1917	A Self-Made Widow	Fitzhugh Castleton	
1917	Betsy Ross	Joseph Ashburn	
1918	A Woman of Redemption	Tim Stanton	
1919	Day Dreams	Dan O'Hara	
1919	The Pest	Gene Giles	
1919	Through the Wrong Door	Burt Radcliff	
1919	Strictly Confidential	Vernon, Lord Bantock	
1920	Godless Men	Dan Darrin	
1921	The Ace of Hearts	Mr. Forrest	
1921	The Silent Call	Clark Moran	
1921	Voices of the City	Graham	
1921	The Poverty of Riches	Tom Donaldson	
1922	Affinities	Day Illington	
1922	Quincy Adams Sawyer	Quincy Adams Sawyer	
1922	South of Suva	John Webster	
1923	The Destroying Angel	Hugh Miller Whittaker	
1923	Divorce	Jim Parker	
1923	The Woman of Bronze	Paddy Miles	
1924	The White Sin	Grant Van Gore	
1924	Code of the Wilderness	Rex Randerson	
1925	Confessions of a Queen	Prince Alexei\	
1925	Daughters Who Pay	Dick Foster	
1925	Chickie	Barry Dunne	
1926	Rocking Moon	Gary Tynan	
1926	The Dice Woman	Hamlin	
1926	Pals in Paradise	Bill Harvey	
1927	The Opening Night	Jimmy Keane	
1927	The Heart of the Yukon	Jim Winston	
1927	Heroes in Blue	Bob Kelly	
1927	For Ladies Only	Cliff Coleman	
1927	Ragtime	Ted Mason	
1929	Say It with Songs	Dr. Burnes, surgeon	
1929	Skin Deep	District Attorney Carlson	
1931	Mounted Fury	Jim Leyton	
