= Percy Coleman (baseball) =

American baseball player (1876–1948)

- Pitcher
- Born: October 15, 1876; Mason, Ohio, U.S.
- Died: February 16, 1948 (aged 71); Van Nuys, California, U.S.
- Batted: Unknown Threw: Right

MLB debut
- July 2, 1897, for the St. Louis Browns

Last MLB appearance
- October 1, 1898, for the Cincinnati Reds

MLB statistics
- Win–loss record: 1–3
- Strikeouts: 12
- Earned run average: 6.69
- Stats at Baseball Reference

Teams
- St. Louis Browns (1897); Cincinnati Reds (1898)

Pierce Devon "Percy" Coleman (October 10, 1876 – February 16, 1948) was an American professional baseball pitcher who played parts of two Major League seasons.

== Early life ==
Coleman was born in Mason, Ohio, the first of three children of Irish-American parents, William P. Coleman, a farmer, and Florence A. (McVay) Coleman on Oct. 15, 1876. He attended Mason High School and graduated in 1894.

He enlisted in the U.S. Army July 18, 1898 as a private with the 6th Infantry Company G during the Spanish–American War. He was honorably discharged from Fort Sam Houston, Texas in January 1899.

== Professional baseball career ==
Coleman pitched in the National League in 13 games in 1897 for the St. Louis Browns at age 20, and one game in 1898 for the Cincinnati Reds. He made his MLB debut on July 2, 1897, when he came on in relief in the sixth inning of a 13-1 Browns loss on the road vs. the Cleveland Spiders, allowing 4 runs in 4 innings.

His final game was on October 1, 1898; the Cincinnati Enquirer story reported "Coleman pitched fairly good ball" with 6 innings giving up just one run before tiring in the seventh in a 7-3 complete-game loss to St. Louis.

His overall MLB record was 1–3 with a 6.69 earned run average. In 37 official plate appearances, he had seven hits for a .226 batting average.

After his big-league career ended, he compiled a record of 22–18 in three seasons (1898–1900) in the minor leagues in Grand Rapids, Michigan, Savannah, Georgia, Birmingham, Alabama, San Antonio, Texas and Portsmouth, Virginia.

By far his best season was 1899 at age 22 for the San Antonio Bronchos in the Class C Texas League as he led the team in wins with a 13–8 record, starting 21 games and completing 20 with 183 innings pitched. He also played 45 games in the outfield and 5 at first base, batting .338 with 100 hits in 296 plate appearances. On July 10, 1899, Coleman "of the defunct San Antonio ball team accepted an offer from the Buffalo team of the Western league at $150 per month."

The following year, 1900, was his last in pro baseball as he went 6–4 with a 1.05 ERA for the Portsmouth Boers of the Class D Virginia League. He batted .211 in 57 at-bats.

== Personal life ==
Coleman was married to Grace (Slayback) and they later lived in Cincinnati. They eventually moved to California as their daughter, Majel Coleman, pursued an acting career. She appeared in 11 feature films between 1923 and 1934 and also was a model. A 1922 newspaper article stated that, on Majel's 19th birthday, she "received an instrument of destruction this week in the shape of a snappy speedster (car) from her father, P.D. Coleman, southwestern representative of a large eastern paint concern."

In 1910 the Colemans were residing in Kokomo, Indiana and his occupation was "commercial salesman" for RedSeal Paint. His World War I draft registration stated that he was a traveling salesman for the Sherwin-Williams Co. based in Cincinnati.

Coleman and his wife and daughter resided in Los Angeles as of 1930. Percy Coleman died at age 71 in 1948 in Van Nuys, California and is buried in Los Angeles National Cemetery. In 2007, he was posthumously inducted into the Mason Athletic Hall of Fame.
