= Royalmont Academy =

Location
- 200 Northcrest Drive; Mason, (Warren County), Ohio 45040; United States; 39°21′42″N 84°17′47″W

Information
- Type: Private
- Motto: Semper Altius (Always Higher)
- Denomination: Roman Catholic
- Established: 1996
- School district: Roman Catholic Archdiocese of Cincinnati
- Head of school: Joshua Ater
- Grades: Preschool–12
- Gender: Co-ed
- Enrollment: 104 (2018–19)
- Campus type: Suburban
- Colors: Navy, burgundy, white
- Athletics conference: Catholic Youth Sports Organization (K–8)
- Mascot: Cristero
- Website: royalmontacademy.org

Royalmont Academy is a private PK–12 Catholic school located in Mason, Ohio, United States. The non-diocesan school is located within the Archdiocese of Cincinnati. Royalmont is divided into a half-day and all-day preschool, a kindergarten–8th grade division, and the Royalmont Academy Classical Preparatory High School.

== History ==
Royalmont Academy was founded in Cincinnati's Oakley neighborhood in 1996. The school moved to Church Street in Mason in 1998, then to Western Row Road in 2002. On July 28, 2012, the school moved to its present location at the former Mason Heights Elementary School. Royalmont purchased the campus from Mason City School District on July 17, 2014, for $1 million. That year, Royalmont added a college-preparatory high school division, the first Catholic high school to open in the area since Badin High School opened in 1966.
