= West of Broadway =

West of Broadway may refer to:

- West of Broadway (1926 film), a lost American silent romantic comedy Western film
- West of Broadway (1931 film), an American pre-Code drama film
