= Majel Coleman =

American actress

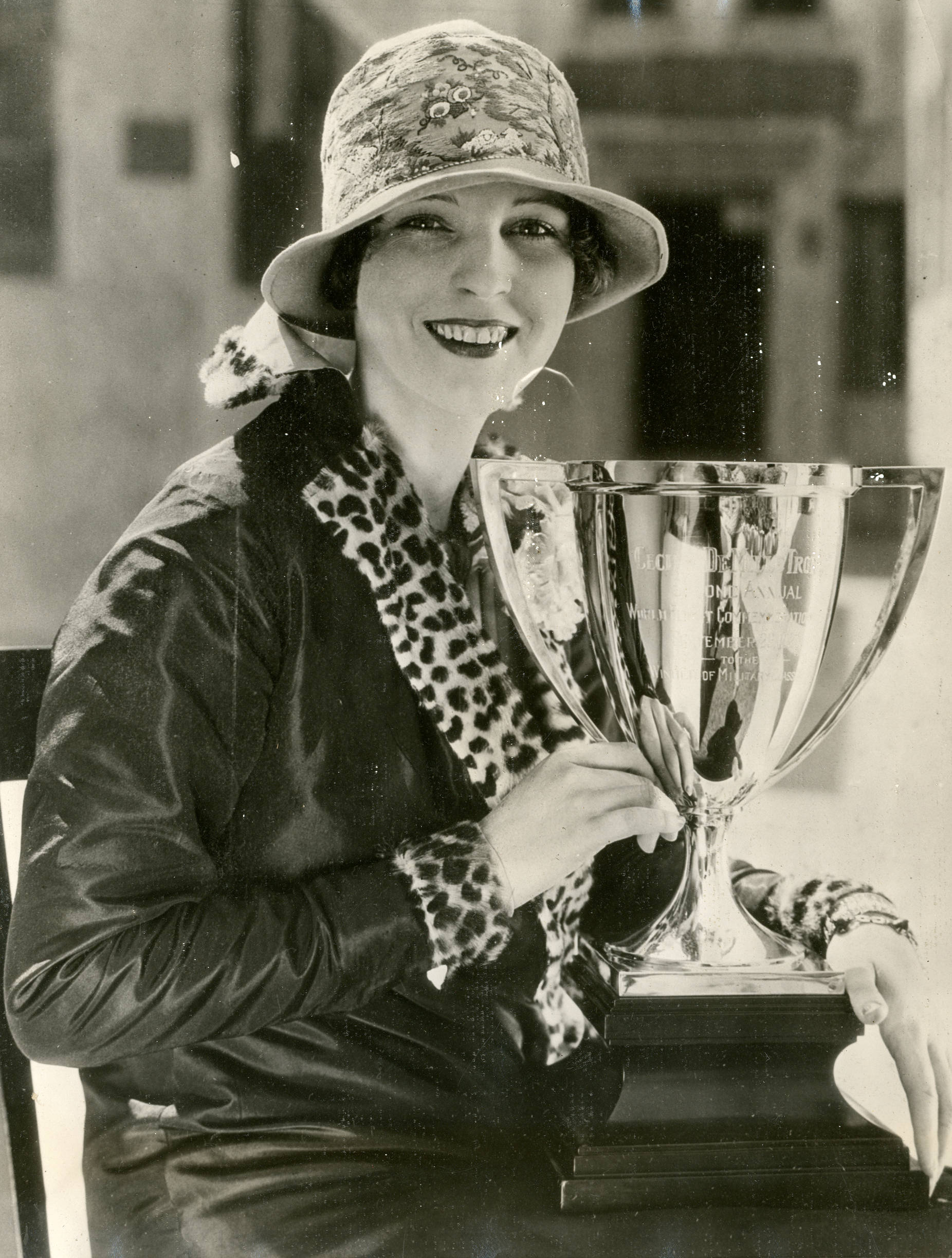
- Born: February 22, 1903; Mason, Ohio, United States
- Died: July 27, 1980 (aged 77); Paramount, California, United States
- Occupation: Actress

Majel Coleman (February 22, 1903 – July 27, 1980) was an American film actress and model from Mason, Ohio. Most of her 11 film credits are silent movie features.

== Early life ==
Coleman was born in Mason, Ohio (just north of Cincinnati, Ohio) to Pierce ("Percy") Coleman and Grace (née Slayback) Coleman. Her father was a former Major League Baseball pitcher from Mason. Majel and her parents lived in Cincinnati, where she attended Hughes Center High School, class of 1921.

She won a Cincinnati Post beauty contest in 1920 and was declared the "Most Beautiful Girl in Hamilton County."

== Modeling career ==
Coleman -- "a quiet red-haired girl" -- was listed among the 14 most beautiful women in the world in 1926 along with Sally Rand, Etta Lee, Eugenia Gilbert, Jocelyn Lee, Sally Long, Clara Morris, Olive Borden, Christina Montt, Adalyn Mayer, Thais Valdemar, Yola D'Avril, and Dorothy Seastrom.

Coleman's hands became an ideal of perfection, beginning with film screen tests which revealed their beauty, and she was often a hand double in movies. A 1927 nationally syndicated newspaper article noted that "Many times when you have gazed upon a closeup of a feminine hand reaching for a cigaret (sic), playing with gold and jewels, or coming snakelike fashion from behind a heavy curtain, the hand has not been that of a star. More often such hand shots are made with a double furnishing the hands. Those perfectly tapered fingers, those matchless nails, the slender wrists that are the envy of every woman have been shown with care. One star who broke into the movies by her perfect hands is Majel Coleman. Long before the directors discovered that Majel Coleman's face was not hard to look upon, her hands were given screen tests and found not wanting. Majel's hands began to be famous in Hollywood."

A nationally syndicated newspaper story in 1922 noted that "The largest close-up of a pair of hands ever made for the screen was taken recently of those belonging to Majel Coleman, a former Cincinnati society girl, who is now carrying a career for herself in the films. Miss Coleman's shapely hands were used in several statues made by the sculptors of the Cincinnati Art Institute, and caused much comment when the statues were exhibited at the Exposition Internationale des Arts, in Paris.

Coleman was also featured in print advertising campaigns including for William Hepner's "Halo-Tress" cosmetics and wigs.

== Film actress ==
Majel went to Hollywood in 1921 after high school.

A February 1922 newspaper article stated that she had been disqualified from an amateur beauty contest because her photos were shot by a professional photographer. However, "her beauty attracted the attention of a big middle-western theater owner, who sent her photos on to a representative of a Pacific coast studio, with the result that she has already appeared in five feature productions and is now a permanent resident at the capital of the cinema world." A month earlier a newspaper reported that "Max Linder is working on a burlesque of 'The Three Musketeteers', a five-reel Goldwyn comedy nearing completion. He has chosen what he thinks are two real American beauties -- Jobyna Ralston of New York and Majel Coleman, winner of a pretty girl contest in Cincinnati."

On her 19th birthday in 1922, a newspaper reported she "received an instrument of destruction this week in the shape of a snappy speedster (car) from her father, P.D. Coleman, southwestern representative of a large eastern paint concern. Miss Coleman is now appearing in King Baggott's 'Kisses' at Universal."

Coleman wanted to work for Cecil B. De Mille in particular. When she could not find a way to get his attention, she lost interest in working for other movie studios. Then a chance happening changed Coleman's future. De Mille noticed Coleman when a small stray dog followed her home and became intimidated by her police dog. The little dog jumped off her porch and broke its leg on the cement below. It continued on across the street with Coleman pursuing. A car driven by the film producer almost ran over the red haired beauty. Together Demille and Coleman took the puppy to the hospital. De Mille then signed Coleman to a movie contract in March 1925. He made tests and arranged for her to act in small parts in his next films.

Her early motion picture efforts include roles in Bluebeard's Eighth Wife (1923) and several Harry Carey westerns, Soft Shoes (1925) and West of Broadway (1926). In Corporal Kate (1926) Coleman stars with Vera Reynolds and Julia Faye. The setting is Rivecourt, France, a town almost totally destroyed by the German offensive of August–September 1918, during World War I. The American 7th Machine Gun Battalion fought there.

In 1927, Coleman played Procula, the wife of Pontius Pilate, in Demille's production of King of Kings. Her last films include roles in The Girl In The Glass Cage (1929) and Romance of the Rio Grande (1929).

== Personal life ==
Majel Coleman was married to Academy Award-winning feature film and television set decorator Victor Gangelin (1899-1967), whose father was born in Russia and mother in Germany. The couple lived in Los Angeles. Her husband died in 1967 at age 68.

Majel Coleman Gangelin died at age 77 in 1980 in Paramount, California.

== Filmography ==
Year	Title	Role	Notes
1923	Bluebeard's 8th Wife		Lost film
1924	Unmarried Wives	Mrs. Lowell	
1925	Soft Shoes	Mabel Packer	
1925	The Dressmaker from Paris	Mannequin	Uncredited; Lost film
1926	Sunny Side Up	Showgirl	
1926	West of Broadway	Muriel Styles	Lost film
1926	Corporal Kate	Evelyn Page	
1927	The King of Kings	Proculla - Wife of Pilate	
1927	Almost Human	Cecile Adams	
1929	The Girl in the Glass Cage	Isabelle Van Court	Lost film
1929	Romance of the Rio Grande	Dorry Wayne	Lost film
1934	The Girl from Missouri	Paige's Stenographer	Uncredited
