= Mason City Schools (Ohio) =

School district in Ohio, United States

Address
- 211 North East Street Mason, Ohio, United States, 45040-1760; United States
- Coordinates: 39°21′45″N 84°18′38″W

District information
- Type: City school district
- Motto: Growing Greatness Together
- Grades: PreK–12
- Superintendent: Jonathan Cooper
- Chair of the board: Ian Orr
- Governing agency: Ohio Department of Education
- NCES District ID: 3905045
- District ID: 050450

Students and staff
- Students: 10,627 (2017–18)
- Teachers: 474.36
- Student–teacher ratio: 22.40
- Athletic conference: Greater Miami Conference
- District mascot: Comets
- Colors

Other information
- Website: www.masonohioschools.com

Mason City Schools (officially the Mason City School District) is a city school district that primarily serves Mason and Deerfield Township in Warren County, Ohio, United States. As of 2018, the district has 10,627 students. Its high school, William Mason High School, is the largest in Ohio by enrollment.

== History ==
Mason's first school was located on Main Street and stood until the 1960s. New buildings were built for Mason High School on North East Street in 1911, 1936, and 1953. All three are now district administrative offices. Mason Heights Elementary School opened in 1967.

In the 1990s and 2000s, Mason City Schools grew significantly as Cincinnati's urban sprawl pushed northward into Warren County and Mason became Ohio's fastest-growing city. Procter & Gamble opened a Health Care Research Center that spurred construction on almost 40 new subdivisions in Mason. From 1990 to 2002, the district tripled in enrollment from 2,653 students in four buildings to 8,100 students in seven buildings. By 1998, it had become Mason's fifth-largest employer, with a $23 million annual budget and 574 employees. The district responded to funding and overcrowding concerns by opening a new middle school in 1994, signing a 10-year, $1.1 million contract with Pepsi in 1997, and opening the $71.9 million, three-story, 379,000-square-foot (35,200 m^{2}) William Mason High School in September 2003. District enrollment doubled between 1999 and 2009 before peaking at 11,000 around 2013. A $30 million addition to the high school opened in 2009.

In 2014, Royalmont Academy, a private Catholic school, purchased the district's former Mason Heights Elementary School for its high school division.

In 2016, more than 80 school districts, including Mason, began publishing "quality profiles" in addition to the district report cards mandated by the Ohio Department of Education.

== Geography ==
The Mason school district covers 25 square miles (65 km^{2}) in the City of Mason and Deerfield Township in Warren County, as well as small portions of Union and Turtlecreek townships in Warren County and West Chester Township in Butler County. The boundary is marked by small road signs. Kings Local Schools covers parts of Mason and Deerfield Township to the east, Lebanon City Schools includes some areas to the north that have been annexed into the City of Mason, Princeton City Schools includes small portions of Deerfield and West Chester townships to the southwest, and Lakota Local Schools includes the remainder of West Chester Township to the west.

== Schools ==
The district operates five schools:

- Mason Early Childhood Center (pre-kindergarten through second grade)
- Mason Elementary School (third grade) through (fourth grade) (Opened 2019-2020 year)
- Mason Intermediate School (fifth grade through sixth grade)
- Mason Middle School (seventh grade and eighth grade)
- William Mason High School (ninth grade through twelfth grade)

Junior- and senior-year high school students also have the option to attend one of the four campuses of Great Oaks Institute of Technology and Career Development, a joint vocational school district of which Mason is a member.
