= Sunny Side Up (1926 film) =

1926 film

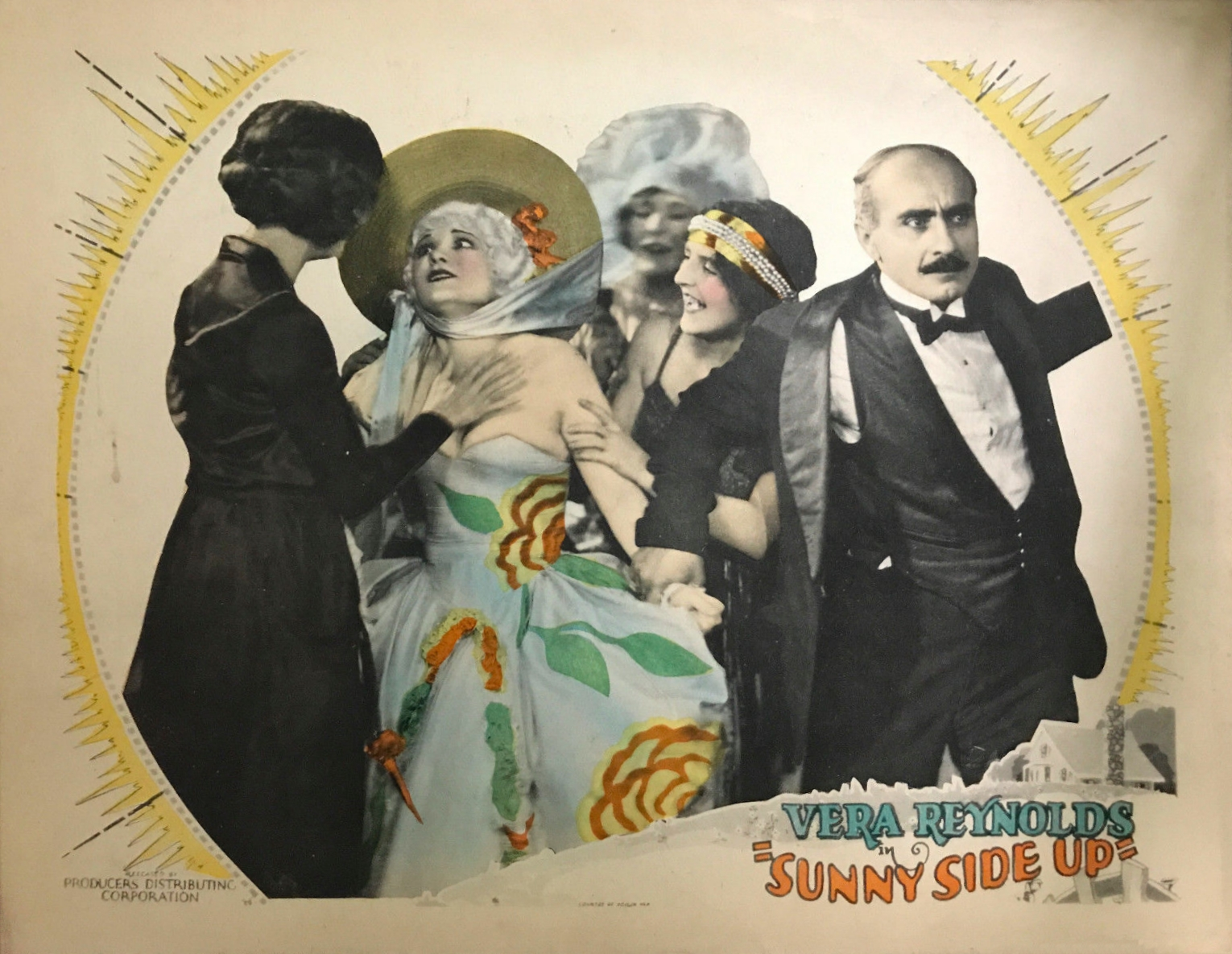
- Lobby card
- Directed by: Donald Crisp
- Written by: Beulah Marie Dix; Elmer Harris
- Based on: Sunny Ducrow by Henry St. John Cooper
- Starring: Vera Reynolds; Edmund Burns; George K. Arthur
- Cinematography: J. Peverell Marley
- Production company: De Mille Pictures Corporation
- Distributed by: Producers Distributing Corporation
- Release date: August 2, 1926
- Running time: 66 minutes
- Country: United States
- Language: Silent (English intertitles)

Sunny Side Up is a 1926 American silent comedy film directed by Donald Crisp and starring Vera Reynolds, Edmund Burns, and George K. Arthur.

It is also known by the alternative title of Footlights. It is based on the novel Sunny Ducrow by Henry St. John Cooper.

== Cast ==
- Vera Reynolds as Sunny Ducrow
- Edmund Burns as Stanley Dobrington
- George K. Arthur as Bert Jackson
- Zasu Pitts as Evelyn
- Ethel Clayton as Cissy Cason
- Louis Natheaux as Stanley's Assistant
- Sally Rand as A Dancer
- Jocelyn Lee as Showgirl
- Majel Coleman as Showgirl

== Bibliography ==
- Charles Stumpf. ZaSu Pitts: The Life and Career. McFarland, 2010.
