= Henry St. John Cooper =

English novelist

Charles Henry St. John Cooper (1869 – 1926) was a prolific English novelist of school and adventure fiction. He wrote thousands of stories for several Amalgamated Press papers, sometimes under the pen name Mabel St. John. He is perhaps best known for creating, in 1908, the character Pollie Green, considered the "most popular, though not the first, in a series of irrepressible schoolgirl heroines", for The Girls' Friend. According to his son, he also wrote many "authorless" Sexton Blake stories for the Union Jack. His novel Sunny Ducrow was adapted into a 1926 film, Sunny Side Up.

Actress Gladys Cooper was his half-sister, and musician Henry Russell was his maternal grandfather.

== Bibliography ==
=== Novels as Mabel St. John ===
- Most Cruelly Wronged. London, Amalgamated Press, 1907.
- Only a Singing Girl. London, Amalgamated Press, 1907.
- Rival Beauties. London, Amalgamated Press, 1907.
- Under a Ban. London, Amalgamated Press, 1907.
- Her Father's Sin. London, Amalgamated Press, 1908.
- Polly Green: A School Story [and Coosha, at Cambridge, — Engaged, in Society, at Twenty-One]. London, Amalgamated Press, 6 vols., 1909-11.
- Romany Ruth: A Gipsy Love Story. London, Amalgamated Press, 1909.
- Just a Barmaid. London, Amalgamated Press, 1909.
- A Daughter Scorned. London, Amalgamated Press, 1911.
- Jane Emily. London, Amalgamated Press, 1911.
- The Twins of Twineham. London, Amalgamated Press, 1911.
- The Dear Old Home. London, Amalgamated Press, 1912.
- The Best Woman in the World. London, Fleetway House, 1913.
- Nell of the Camp; or, The Pride of the Prairie. London, Fleetway House, 1913.
- The Outcasts of Crowthorpe College. London, Fleetway House, 1913.
- The Schoolgirl Bride. London, Fleetway House, 1913.
- Faults on Both Sides. London, Fleetway House, 1914.
- Fine Feathers! or, The Wife Who Would Be Smart. London, Fleetway House, 1914.
- From Mill to Mansion. London, Fleetway House, 1914.
- Kiddy, The Coffee-Stall Girl. London, Fleetway House, 1914.
- Little Miss Millions. London, Fleetway House, 1914.
- Married to Her Master. London, Fleetway House, 1914.
- My Lancashire Queen. London, Fleetway House, 1914.
- Sally in Our Alley. London, Fleetway House, 1914.
- The Ticket-of-Leave Girl. London, Fleetway House, 1914.
- When a Girl's Pretty. London, Fleetway House, 1914.
- John Jordan, Slave-Driver. London, Fleetway House, 1915.
- Just Jane Ann. London, Fleetway House, 1915.
- The Lass That Loved a Sailor. London, Fleetway House, 1915.
- Maggie Darling. London, Fleetway House, 1915.
- My Girl, Regan. London, Fleetway House, 1915.
- The Post Office Girl. London, Fleetway House, 1915.
- Shielded from the World. London, Fleetway House, 1915.
- Too Wilful for Words! London, Fleetway House, 1915.
- The Worst Wife in the World. London, Fleetway House, 1915.
- Born in Prison: The Story of a Mill-Girl’s Sacrifice. London, Fleetway House, 1916.
- Cook at School. London, Fleetway House, 1916.
- How the Money Goes! London, Fleetway House, 1916.
- In Mother's Place. London, Fleetway House, 1916.
- The Mistress of the Fifth Standard. London, Fleetway House, 1916.
- The Soul of the Mill. London, Fleetway House, 1916.
- The Best Girls Are Here. London, Fleetway House, 1917.
- Daisy Earns Her Living. London, Fleetway House, 1917.
- Daisy Peach Abroad. London, Fleetway House, 1917.
- Liz o’ Loomland. London, Fleetway House, 1917.
- Married at School. London, Fleetway House, 1917.
- Our Nell. London, Fleetway House, 1917.
- The “Sixpenny Ha'penny” Duchess. London, Fleetway House, 1917.
- What a Woman Can Do! London, Fleetway House, 1917.
- The Autograph Huners. London, Fleetway House, 1918.
- Dolly Daydreams! London, Fleetway House, 1918.
- For Her Lover's Sake. London, Fleetway House, 1918.
- His Sealed Lips! or, The Tale He Would Not Tell?. London, Fleetway Hause, 1918.
- Little and Good. London, Fleetway House, 1918.
- Little Miss Innocence. London, Fleetway House, 1918.
- Millgirl and Dreamer. London, Fleetway House. 1918.
- Old Smith’s Nurse. London, Fleetway House, 1918.
- Pearl of the West. London, Fleetway House. 1918.
- Her Stolen Baby. London, Fleetway House, 1919.
- Apronstrings. London, Amalgamated Press, 1919.
- Ashamed of the Shop: or, Miss High-and-Mighty. London, Amalgamated Press, 1919.
- The Belle of the Works. London, Amalgamated Press, 1919.
- The Favourite Wins! or, The Bookmakers Bride. London, Amalgamated Press, 1919.
- Good Gracious, Marian! London, Amalgamated Press. 1919.
- The Little “Gutter Girl.” London, Amalgamated Press, 1919.
- Bests on the Stage. London, Amalgamated Press, 1920.
- The Wife Who Dragged Him Down!. London, Amalgamated Press, 1920.
- A Boxer’ Sweetheart. London, Amalgamated Press. 1920.
- The Wife Who Would Re “Master”. London, Amalgamated Press, 1920.
- The Cinderella Girl. London, Amalgamated Press, 1920.
- In the Shadows!. London, Amalgamated Press, 1920.
- Afary Ellen— Mill-Lass. London, Amalgamated Press, 1920.
- Mill-Lass o' Mine’. London, Amalgamated Press, 1920.
- Wedded But Not Wooed; or, Marry Me—Or Go to Prison!. London, Amalgamated Press, 1920.
- From Pillar to Past; or, No Home of Her Own. London, Amalgamated Press, 1921.
- Wife—or Housekeeper?. London, Amalgamated Press. 1921.
- A House, But Not a Home,. London, Amalgamated Press, 1921.
- The Husband, The Wife, and the Friend. London, Amalgamated Press, 1921.
- A Jealous Wife's Revenge!. London, Amalgamated Press. 1921.
- Just Jane Emily. London, Amalgamated Press, 1921.
- Little Miss Lancashire; or, Moll o' the Mill. London. Amalgamated Press, 1921.
- Lonely Little Lucy. London, Amalgamated Press, 1921.
- Mad for Dress!. London, Amalgamated Press, 1921.
- Sally All-Smiles. London, Amalgamated Press, 1921.
- The School Against Her!. London, Amalgamated Press. 1920.
- Scorned by “His” Mother''. London,, Amalgamated Press, 1921.
- Ann All-Alone: The Story of a Girl's Great Self-Sacrifice. London, Amalgamated Press, 1922.
- Wife or Maid? or, Scorned by Her Workmates. London, Amalgamated Press, 1922.
- The Brute!. London, Amalgamated Press, 1922.
- We Want Our Mummy!. London, Amalgamated Press, 1922.
- Gipsy Born!. London, Amalgamated Press, 1922.
- Tattling Tongues. London, Amalgamated Press. 1922.
- The Gipsy Schoolgirl. London, Amalgamated Press, 1922.
- Girl of the Prairie. London, Amaigamated Press, 1922.
- The Home Without a Father!. London, Amalgamated Press. 1922.
- Mather Knows Best! or, Uttered in Anger!. London, Amalgamated Press, 1922.
- Mr. Leslie’s School for Girls,. London, Amalgamated Press, 1922.
- Nobody's Girl. London, Amalgamated Press, 1922.
- Rich Girl— Charity Girl!. London, Amalgamated Press, 1922.
- Blood Money!. London, Amalgamated Press, 1923
- The Disappearance of Barbara. London. Amalgamated Press, 1923.
- Such a Fine Fellow! London, Amalgamated Press, 1923.
- The Gipsy Actress. London, Amalgamated Press, 1923.
- The Girl Who Married the Wrong Man!. London, Amalgamated Press, 1923.
- He Couldn’t Take Money! or, The “Old Fool” of the Family!. London, Amalgamated Press, 1923.
- His Wife—or His Mother? or, No Home of Her Own. London, Amalgamated Press, 1923.
- I'm Not a Common Girl! London, Amalgamated Press, 1923.
- Jenny Luck of Brendon’s Mills. London, Amalgamated Press, 1923.
- The New Girl at Bellforth. London, Amalgamated Press, 1923.
- The Second Husband. London, Amalgamated Press, 1923.
- Secrets of the Shop! London, Amalgamated Press, 1923.
- Too Old for Her Husband! London, Amalgamated Press, 1924.
- Bringing Up Becky! London, Amalgamated Press, 1924.
- She Was an Actress. London, Amalgamated Press, 1924.
- Go Borrowing—Go Sorrowing. London, Amalgamated Press, 1924.
- A Son to Be Proud Of! London, Amalgamated Press, 1924.
- He Married a Mill-Lass. London, Amalgamated Press, 1924.
- The Island Girl. London, Amalgamated Press, 1924.
- Married to His Wife’s Family. London, Amalgamated Press, 1924.
- She Wrecked Their Home! or, A Son’s a Son till He Takes Him a Wife. London, Amalgamated Press, 1924.
- Midsummer Madness! London, Amalgamated Press, 1924.
- The Mill-Girl’s Bargain! London, Amalgamated Press, 1924.
- My Man of the Mill! London, Amalgamated Press, 1924.
- Poisoned Lives! London, Amalgamated Press, 1924.
- The “Sports” of Lyndale. London, Amalgamated Press, 1925.
- As the World Judged. London, Amalgamated Press, 1925.
- When There’s Love at Home. London, Amalgamated Press, 1925.
- A Girl’s Good Name. London, Amalgamated Press, 1925.
- Where Is My Child To-night? London, Amalgamated Press, 1925.
- Just 'Liz-beth Ann. London, Amalgamated Press, 1925.
- Longing for Love. London, Amalgamated Press, 1925.
- Pride Parted Them! London, Amalgamated Press, 1925.
- Shamed by Her Husband! London, Amalgamated Press, 1925.
- She Posed as Their Friend! London, Amalgamated Press, 1925.
- She Shall Never Call You Mother! London, Amalgamated Press, 1925.
- And Still She Loved Him. London, Amalgamated Press, 1926.
- The Daughter He Didn't Want! London, Amalgamated Press, 1926.
- Some Mother’s Child! London, Amalgamated Press, 1926.
- It Is My Duty! London, Amalgamated Press, 1926.
- The Life He Led Her! London, Amalgamated Press, 1926.
- Love Needs Telling. London, Amalgamated Press, 1926.
- Maggie of Marley’s Mill. London, Amalgamated Press, 1926.
- The Man Who Married Again. London, Amalgamated Press, 1926.
- Rivals at School— Rivals Through Life! London, Amalgamated Press, 1926.
- She Sold Her Child! London, Amalgamated Press, 1927.
- He'll Never Marry You! London, Amalgamated Press, 1927.
- Thou Shalt Love Thy Neighbour—. London, Amalgamated Press, 1927.
- Lizbeth Rose. London, Amalgamated Press, 1927.
- Tied to Her Apron Strings! London, Amalgamated Press, 1927.
- The Long, Long Wooing. London, Amalgamated Press, 1927.
- Loved for Her Money. London, Amalgamated Press, 1927.
- The New Girl. London, Amalgamated Press, 1927.
- She'll Never Marry My Son! London, Amalgamated Press, 1927.
- Some Mother’s Son! London, Amalgamated Press, 1928.
- A Beggar at Her Husband’s Door! London, Amalgamated Press, 1928.
- Utterly Alone! London, Amalgamated Press, 1928.
- His Wife or His Work? London, Amalgamated Press, 1928.
- His Wife's Secret! London, Amalgamated Press, 1928.
- Nobody Wants You! London, Amalgamated Press, 1928.
- He Shall Not Marry a Mill-Lass! London, Amalgamated Press, 1929.
- The Husband She Wanted. London, Amalgamated Press, 1930.
- Jess o’ Jordan’s. London, Amalgamated Press, 1930.
- Wedded— But Alone! London, Amalgamated Press, 1930.
- Another Girl Won Him. London, Amalgamated Press, 1935.

=== Novels as Henry St. John Cooper ===
- The Master of the Mill. London, Amalgamated Press, 1910.
- A Shop-Girl’s Revenge. London, Fleetway House, 1914.
- The Cotton King. London, Fleetway House, 1915.
- The Lass He Left Behind Him! London, Fleetway House, 1915.
- The Black Sheep; or, Who Is My Brother? London, Fleetway House, 1916.
- Ready— Aye Ready! A Story of the Bull-Dogs of the Ocean. London, Fleetway House, 1916.
- The Man with the Money. London, Fleetway House, 1917.
- Hero or Scamp? London, Fleetway House, 1918.
- Miss Bolo; or, A Spy in the Home. London, Fleetway House, 1918.
- The Man of Her Dreams. London, Amalgamated Press, 1919.
- The Mill Queen. London, Fleetway House, 1919.
- Sunny Ducrow. London, Sampson Low, 1919.
- There’s Just One Girl. London, Amalgamated Press, 1919.
- Vagabond Jess. London, Amalgamated Press, 1919.
- “Wild-Fire” Nan. London, Amalgamated Press, 1919.
- Fair and False; or, A Whited Sepulchre. London, Amalgamated Press, 1920.
- Her Mother-in-Law. London, Amalgamated Press, 1920.
- James Bevanwood, Baronet. London, Sampson Low, 1920.
- Just a Cottage Maid. London, Amalgamated Press, 1920.
- A Lodger in His Own Home. London, Amalgamated Press. 1920.
- Married to a Miser. London, Amalgamated Press, 1920.
- Men Were Deceivers Ever. London, Amalgamated Press, 1920.
- Mountain Lovers. London, Amalgamated Press, 1920.
- Two Menanda Maid. London, Amalgamated Press, 1920.
- Elizabeth in Dreamland. London, Amalgamated Press, 1921.
- The Garden of Memories. London, Sampson Low, 1921.
- The Island of Eve. London, Amalgamated Press, 1921.
- Love’s Waif. London, Amalgamated Press, 1921.
- Mabel St. John’s Schooldays. London, Amalgamated Press, 1921.
- Madge o’ the Mill. London, Amalgamated Press, 1921.
- Prison-Stained! London, Amalgamated Press, 1921.
- We're Not Wanted Now! London, Amalgamated Press, 1921.
- Carniss and Company. London, Sampson Low, 1922.
- Above Her Station. London, Amalgamated Press, 1922.
- A Daughter of the Loom; or, Go and Marry Your Mill-Girl! London, Amalgamated Press, 1922.
- Fairweather Friends! or, Fleeced by His Family! London, Amalgamated Press, 1922.
- The Imaginary Marriage. London, Sampson Low, 1922.
- Poverty’s Daughter. London, Amalgamated Press, 1922.
- A Snake in the Grass. London, Amalgamated Press, 1922.
- The Vagabond’s Daughter. London, Amalgamated Press, 1922.
- Could She Forgive? London, Amalgamated Press, 1923.
- Gipsy Love. London, Amalgamated Press, 1923.
- The “Head” of the Family; or, Despised by Them All! London, Amalgamated Press, 1923.
- Hidden Hearts. London, Amalgamated Press, 1923.
- Kidnapped. London, Amalgamated Press, 1923.
- Mary Faithful. London, Amalgamated Press, 1923.
- Son o’ Mine! London, Amalgamated Press, 1923.
- Too Common for Him! London, Amalgamated Press, 1923.
- Two's Company...; or, Young Folks Are Best Alone. London, Amalgamated Press, 1923.
- Yield Not to Temptation! London, Amalgamated Press, 1923.
- The Broken Barrier. London, Amalgamated Press, 1924.
- His Wife from the Kitchen! London, Amalgamated Press, 1924.
- Just Plain Jim! or, One of the Rank and File. London, Amalgamated Press, 1924.
- A Lover in Rags. London, Amalgamated Press, 1924.
- Redway Street. London, Amalgamated Press, 1924.
- The Unwanted Heiress. London, Amalgamated Press, 1924.
- The Fortunes of Sally Luck. London, Sampson Low, 1925.
- Lose Money—Lose Friends! London, Amalgamated Press, 1925.
- Nan of No Man's Land. London, Amalgamated Press, 1925.
- The Cottar'’s Daughter. London, Amalgamated Press, 1926.
- The Gallant Lover: A Queen Anne Story. London, Sampson Low, 1926.
- The Golconda Necklace. London, Sampson Low, 1926.
- Whoso Diggeth a Pit—. London, Amalgamated Press, 1926.
- The Woman Who Parted Them! London, Amalgamated Press, 1926.
- The Amazing Tramp. London, Amalgamated Press, 1927.
- Morning Glory. London, Sampson Low, 1927.
- Golden Bait. London, Sampson Low, 1928.
- The Red Veil. London, Sampson Low, 1928.
- As Fate Decrees. London, Sampson Low, 1929.
- Compromise. London, Sampson Low, 1929.
- Retribution. London, Sampson Low, 1930.
- The Millionaire Tramp. London, Sampson Low, 1930.
- When a Man Loves. London, Sampson Low, 1931.
- The Forbidden Road. London, Sampson Low, 1931.
- Love That Divided. London, Sampson Low, 1932.
- The Splendid Love. London, Sampson Low, 1932.
- When Love Compels. London, Sampson Low, 1933.
- Dangerous Paths. London, Sampson Low, 1933.
- As a Woman Wills. London, Sampson Low, 1934.
- The Hush Marriage. London, Sampson Low, 1934.
- Toils of Silence. London, Sampson Low, 1935.
- A Woman’s Way. London, Sampson Low, 1935.
- At Grips with Fate. London, Sampson Low, 1936.
- The Call of Love. London, Sampson Low, 1936.

=== Other publications ===
- Bull- Dogs and Bull- Dog Breeding. London, Jarrolds, 1905.
- Bulldogs and Bulldog Men. London, Jarrolds, 1908.
- Bulldogs and All about Them. London, Jarrolds, 1914.
