= The Girls' Friend =

British story paper

- The cover to The Girls' Friend No. 961, dated 6 April 1918. Art by George Gatcombe.

Publication information
- Publisher: Amalgamated Press
- Schedule: Weekly
- Format: Story paper
- Genre: Romance
- Publication date: February 1898 – January 1931
- No. of issues: 1628 (total) • 68 (1st series) • 1560 (2nd series)

Creative team
- Written by: Henry St. John Cooper; Richard Goyne; Cicely Hamilton; William E. Groves
- Artist(s): George Gatcombe; J. Louis Smythe
- Editor: Hamilton Edwards

The Girls' Friend was a British anthology story paper published by the Amalgamated Press between 1898 and 1931, running for 1662 issues before merging with Poppy's Paper. It was the company's first title aimed at younger women, catering for girls of 16 and over.

== Creation ==
Initially called The Girls' Best Friend, the title was devised via a typical piece of lateral thinking by the company. While The Girl's Own Paper and The Girls' Realm prepared girls for life as women, there was a gap in the market for wholesome but unabashed entertainment. Up to this point fiction in girls' papers had been thinly disguised tracts or outright trash; The Girls' Friend navigated a path between them with an emphasis on romance, with the rags-to-riches tale of a working class girl finding love a common template. It was still achingly conservative, particularly in the editorial, but at least aimed for escapism.

Physically it followed the format of, fittingly, The Boys' Friend, with sixteen 11" x 15" pages, using pink-dyed paper stock; this was not a surprise, as it was also overseen by Hamilton Edwards, editor of that title and its companions, The Boys' Realm and The Boys' Herald. The first issue of The Girl's Best Friend cost a halfpenny, and was dated 26 February 1898.

== Publishing history ==
The first issue mixed fiction (including front page serial "Utterly Alone") with articles on fitness, dreams, fashion ("Women to Copy No. 1 - Grace Darling") and the first of a series of articles going "Behind the Footlights" - again, the latter being a distinct break from The Girl's Own Paper, which considered stage careers to be unbecoming. However, The Girls' Friend was only liberal by comparison; it was still a given that sole goal for all women was to marry a nice man and have kids.

The title was a great success, and its profitability was boosted greatly by advertising revenue from the growing number of feminine beauty products coming on the market as hair powders, posture-correcting corsets, toilet waters and iron jelloids were pitched to readers. The Girls' Friend was often snobbishly referred to as a 'mill-girl paper', something tackled by suitably tart editorials which claimed realism. While this was a shaky defence (Had even a tenth of the number of mill girls shown in The Girls' Friend who were swept away by a handsome young officer from a well-to-do family were mirrored by real life, British industry would have collapsed), the paper was certainly truer to life for most readers than the countryside watercolour expeditions and servant management tips of The Girl's Own Paper. Alfred Harmsworth himself certainly approved, keeping bound volumes of the paper on display in his study at Carmelite House, alongside his beloved Comic Cuts.

While Harmsworth was becoming increasingly distant from the company's juvenile publications as he began acquiring newspapers, their output came under the eye of his secretary George Sutton, who made sure the Chief's principles were followed.

Like the company's women's titles Forget-Me-Not, Home Sweet Home and Home Chat, the fiction was written overwhelmingly by men using female pseudonyms. The most prolific contributor to The Girls' Friend was Henry St. John Cooper; well-known to the readers of boys' papers as 'Henry St. John', he wrote under the name 'Mabel St. John', causing some to think Henry and Mabel were siblings. Another who helped define The Girls' Friend was the artist George Gatcombe, who provided spot illustrations for a huge amount of stories, providing a dazzling array of beautiful women dressed in the latest fashions. Other major contributors included Richard Goyne, Cecily Hamilton and William E. Groves.

After 68 issues, the 'Best', which had always sat awkwardly in the masthead, was dropped from the title. The Girls' Friend did initially make some attempt to experiment beyond romantic and domestic drama; in 1899 detective Martha Wray appeared. While she moved in higher circles and had a more cerebral approach than the two-fisted Sexton Blake, Martha failed to appeal to readers and was short-lived.

Instead, the title would strike gold with Pollie Green in 1908. Devised by the ubiquitous 'Mabel St. John', the plucky girl appeared in a string of serials, and unlike most story paper characters was allowed to age instead of being trapped in amber; she started out as a schoolgirl, went to college in Cambridge, became an adult and eventually got married. Less progressive however was Pollie's best friend Coosha, the daughter of a Zulu chief and provider of much racist slapstick. While the overall arc of Pollie was conservative, along the way she was allowed to demonstrate something of a spark of independence - from serving up classroom justice to schoolmistress martinets to outwitting a string of unsuitable suitors brandishing proposals. While these developments robbed the character of the eternal youth and adventure granted to the likes of Billy Bunter or Tom Merry, the relatable character development made Pollie hugely successful with readers (though she later returned in 'prequel' stories set during her school days). Gatcombe's illustrations for the stories were so popular that The Girls' Friend ran dress patterns for some of Pollie's outfits after receiving numerous reader requests.

Since 1907 many of the serials were compiled in The Girls' Friend Library. The growing sales of both saw The Girls' Friend joined by two weekly companion titles - The Girls' Reader was launched in 1908, and Girls' Home in 1910 followed the same template, and were likewise successful. The trio would draw from the same well of characters and contributors.

Another notable trope of the title was Irish Catholic protagonists, designed to appeal to the growing number of immigrant factory workers. These included young Mary Latimer, Nun - who became a novice and then swiftly Mother Superior at an early age due to her beloved's untimely death and instead channelled her heart to a succession of girls suffering from their own romantic befuddlement - and the wild redhead Glory O'Shea - "as cliché-ridden, story-book Irish as they come", as Mary Cadogan and Patricia Craig aptly described her. After Glory was finally tamed by a wedding ring, writer Mrs. de Winter Baker promptly restarted the cycle with a series focusing on Glory's equally wilful daughter.

The title faced increasing competition after the war, as C. Arthur Pearson Ltd. and Edward Hulton launched their own weeklies in 1919, Peg's Paper and Girls Own Stories respectively, using a smaller format. Amalgamated Press launched their own responses - Bow Bells in 1919, Girls' Cinema in 1920, The Girl's Favourite in 1922 (the same year DC Thomson joined the market with Blue Bird, having already debuted Girls' Weekly in 1912), Ruby in 1923 and Poppy's Paper in 1925.

A change to the same smaller format as these rivals brought The Girls' Friend some respite, but with competition growing and fashions changing the 25 January 1931 was the final issue before it merged with Poppy's Paper after a remarkable 1628 issues. Much like The Boys' Friend, the library bearing The Girls' Friend's name would outlive it considerably, only ending through paper shortages in 1940.
