= Unmarried Wives =

1924 film

- Directed by: James P. Hogan
- Written by: Dorothy Howell
- Produced by: Samuel Sax; James P. Hogan
- Starring: Mildred Harris; Gladys Brockwell; Lloyd Whitlock
- Cinematography: Jack MacKenzie
- Production company: Gotham Pictures
- Distributed by: Lumas Film Corporation
- Release date: August 2, 1924
- Running time: 60 minutes
- Country: United States
- Languages: Silent; English intertitles

Unmarried Wives is a 1924 American silent drama film directed by James P. Hogan and starring Mildred Harris, Gladys Brockwell and Lloyd Whitlock.

== Plot ==
The plot evolves around a love triangle in New-York City.

== Cast ==
- Mildred Harris as Princess Sonya
- Gladys Brockwell as Mrs. Gregory
- Lloyd Whitlock as Tom Gregory
- Bernard Randall as Morris Sands
- George Cooper as Joe Dugan
- Alice Davenport as 'Ma' Casey
- Majel Coleman as Mrs. Lowell

== Preservation ==
The film is preserved in a foreign archive, Filmoteca Espanola Madrid.

== Bibliography ==
- Connelly, Robert B. The Silents: Silent Feature Films, 1910-36, Volume 40, Issue 2. December Press, 1998.
- Munden, Kenneth White. The American Film Institute Catalog of Motion Pictures Produced in the United States, Part 1. University of California Press, 1997.
