= William Mason High School (Mason, Ohio) =

High school in Ohio, United States

Location
- 6100 Mason-Montgomery Road; Mason, Ohio 45040; United States; 39°21′3″N 84°18′26″W

Information
- School type: Public, Coeducational
- School district: Mason City Schools
- Superintendent: Jonathan Cooper
- CEEB code: 363275
- Principal: Ben Brown
- Teaching staff: 141.50 (FTE)
- Grades: 9-12
- Enrollment: 3,488 (2023-2024)
- Student to teacher ratio: 24.65
- Color
- Athletics conference: Greater Miami Conference
- Nickname: Comets
- Newspaper: The Chronicle
- Literary Magazine: Writers' Block
- Website: mhs.masonohioschools.com

William Mason High School, also known as Mason High School (WMHS or MHS), is a four-year public high school located in the Mason City Schools district in Mason, Ohio, a suburb of Cincinnati, Ohio.

== History ==
Mason High School's first commencement was held May 21, 1886, at the Mason Presbyterian Church. The seven graduates completed the three-year high school program and each read their topic paper at the graduation ceremony. Professor Louis Coleman was the school superintendent and possibly the only teacher in the high school.

== Current ==
The current Mason High School facility opened for the 2002-03 school year with 379,000 square feet on a 73-acre campus. In 2009, a $30 million expansion project added 49 classrooms in two new, three-story wings. Opened in 2003, and connected to the high school, is the 149,000 square-foot Mason Community Center, which features an Olympic-sized competition swimming pool, therapy pools, six basketball courts, fitness rooms and exercise equipment. It was a joint project of the City of Mason and Mason City Schools.

As of the 2020-21 school year, Mason High School's enrollment is 3,507 students. It is the largest high school by enrollment in the state of Ohio.

== Athletics ==
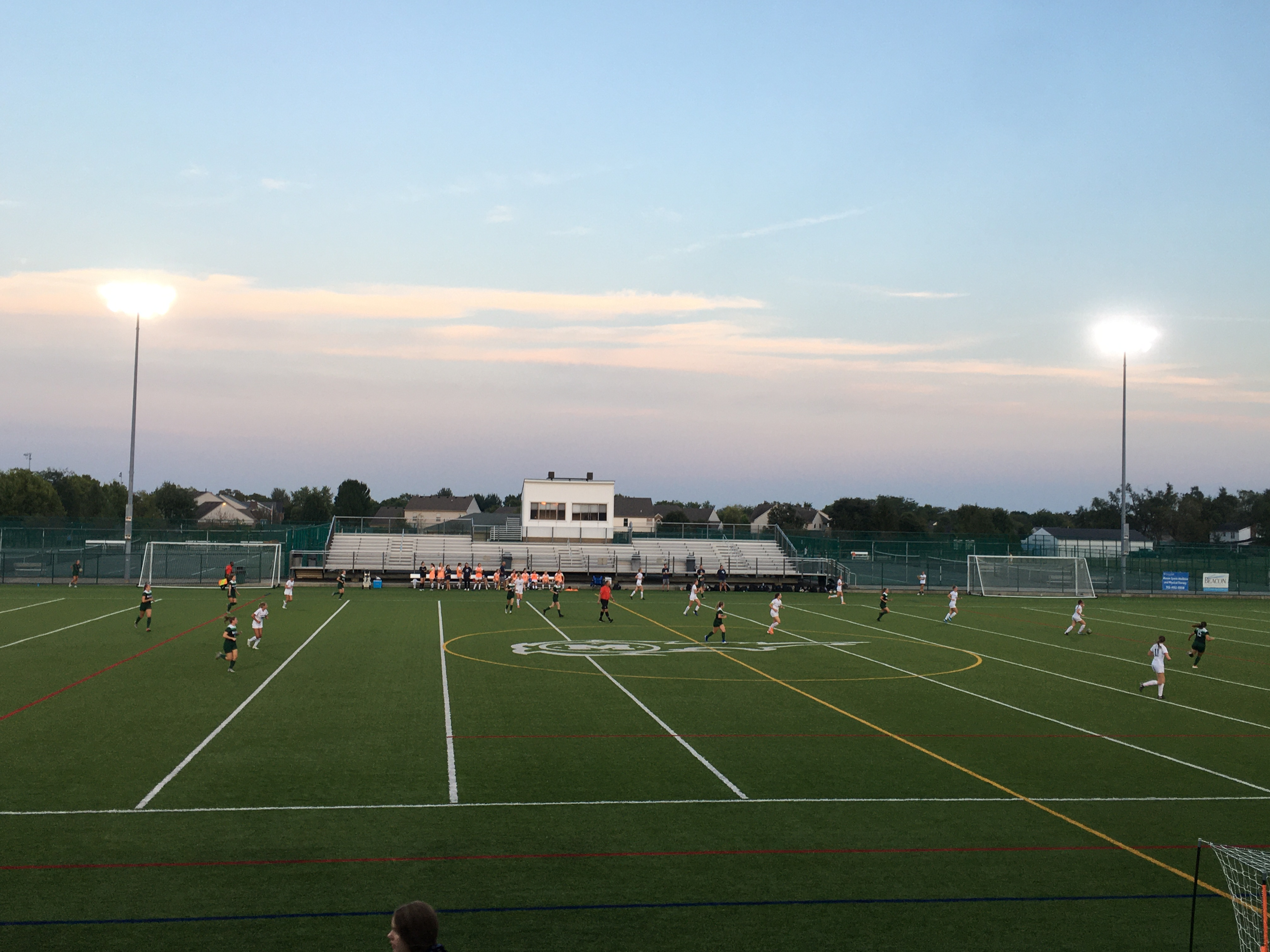
Dwire Field at Beacon Orthopedics TriHealth Stadium, Mason High School

The Comets participate in the Greater Miami Conference, in which they have won 18 consecutive All-Sports titles through 2024-25. Previously, Mason was a charter member of the Fort Ancient Valley Conference from 1965-66 to 2006-07.

=== OHSAA State championships ===
- Baseball - 2024
- Boys cross country - 2008, 2014, 2021, 2022, 2024
- Boys soccer - 2013
- Girls swimming and diving - 2018, 2019
- Girls cross country - 2012, 2013, 2022
- Girls golf - 2008, 2009, 2010
- Girls track and field - 2004
- Girls basketball - 2000

==== Non-OHSAA State Championships ====
- Girls tennis - 2017, 2018, 2019, 2020, 2021, 2022, 2023, 2024 (Ohio Tennis Coaches Association tournament)
- Boys tennis - 2018, 2019, 2021, 2025, (Ohio Tennis Coaches Association tournament)
- Boys lacrosse - 2004
- Girls water polo - 2013
- Boys ultimate frisbee - 2017, 2021, 2022, 2023

== Notable alumni ==
- Angela Bizzarri (class of 2006), NCAA national champion, 9-time All-American cross country and track runner at the University of Illinois
- Percy Coleman (class of 1894), MLB pitcher
- Brant Daugherty (class of 2004), actor, Pretty Little Liars, Army Wives, Dancing with the Stars
- Josh Kline (class of 2008), NFL offensive lineman; member of 2015 Super Bowl-winning New England Patriots
- Elijah Nkansah (class of 2013), NFL offensive lineman
- Dan Patrick (class of 1974), sports broadcaster and host, NBC Sports and ESPN, TV/radio host of The Dan Patrick Show
- T. J. Zeuch (class of 2013), MLB pitcher
