= Josh Kline =

American football player (born 1989)

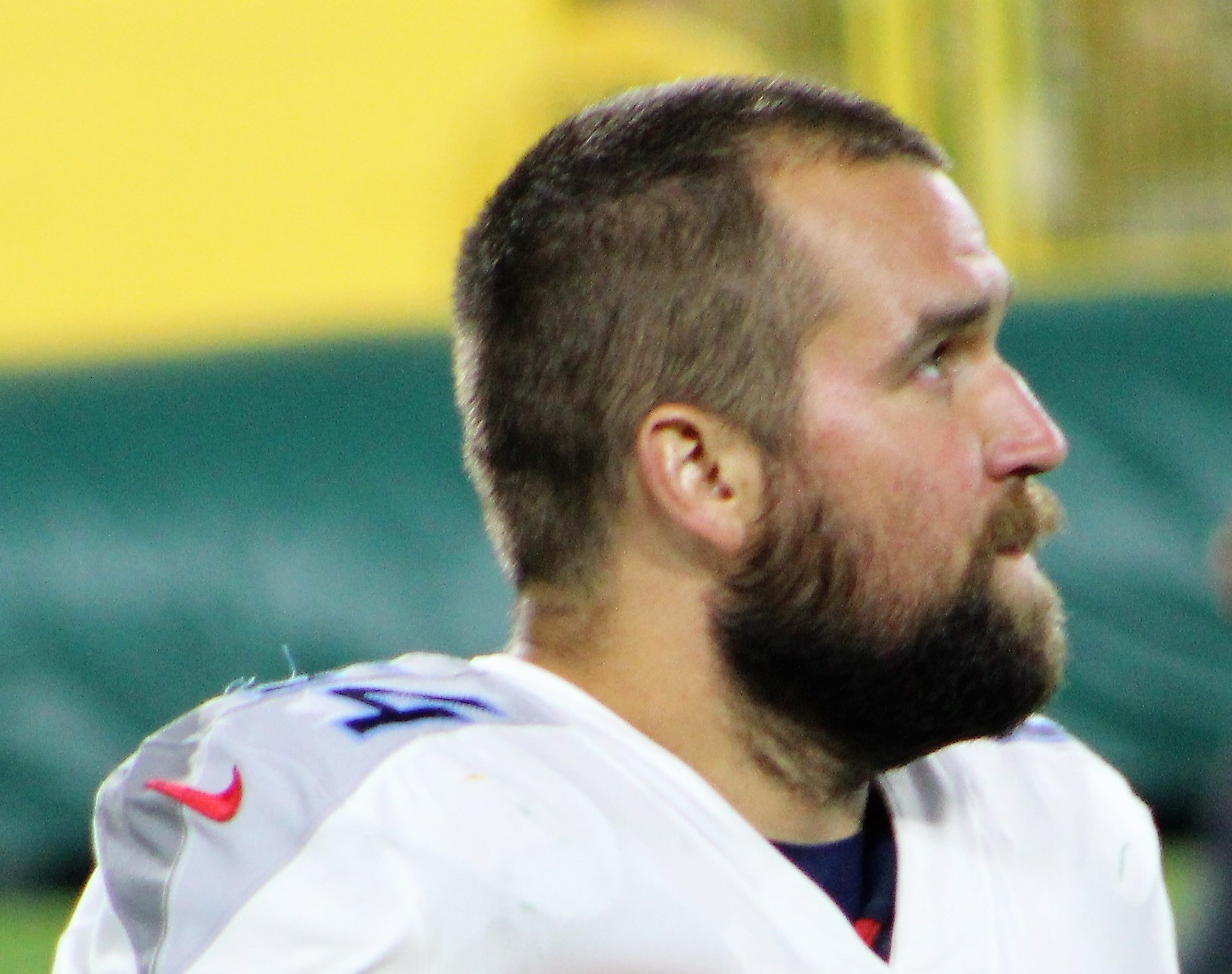
- Kline with the Tennessee Titans in 2018

No. 67, 64
- Position: Guard

Personal information
- Born: December 29, 1989 (age 36); Hoffman Estates, Illinois, U.S.
- Listed height: 6 ft 3 in (1.91 m)
- Listed weight: 300 lb (136 kg)

Career information
- High school: William Mason (Mason, Ohio)
- College: Kent State
- NFL draft: 2013: undrafted

Career history
- New England Patriots (2013–2015); Tennessee Titans (2016–2018); Minnesota Vikings (2019)

Awards and highlights
- Super Bowl champion (XLIX); Second-team All-MAC (2012)

Career NFL statistics
- Games played: 92
- Games started: 77
- Stats at Pro Football Reference

Josh Kline (born December 29, 1989) is an American former professional football player who was an offensive guard in the National Football League (NFL). He played college football for Kent State Golden Flashes.

== Early life ==
Kline was born in Hoffman Estates, Illinois, to Rick and Julie Kline. Josh and his family lived in Hartville, Ohio (near Akron), until they moved to Mason, just north of Cincinnati, when Josh was in second grade.

Kline grew up in Mason, and graduated from William Mason High School in 2008. He was an offensive lineman in football, playing tackle and center, earning second-team All-Greater Miami Conference honors as the Comets' center his senior year.

As a wrestler, in his senior year, Kline was the Ohio Division I (big-school) champion in the 285-pound weight class. His record for the year was 45–1 with 32 pins. In the state meet, he pinned his first two opponents and in the semifinal he was taken to overtime, prevailing 6–4. He then won the championship match by pin.

Although he grew up just outside Cincinnati, Kline was a Cleveland Browns fan due to his father Rick's roots in northeast Ohio.

== College career ==
Kline was recruited by Mid-American Conference schools and chose to attend Kent State University in Kent, Ohio. "My grandparents still live there. I was familiar with Kent and knew the area well. ... it was a combination of having a chance to play and an opportunity to help change the culture a little bit. We did my senior year. It was a good experience and I’m glad I picked it.” Kline redshirted the 2008 season before playing in all 12 games of his redshirt freshman campaign in 2009. In 2010, he started in eight of 12 games, then started all 12 games in 2011, making seven starts at right tackle before sliding inside to right guard for the final five games.

As a senior, Kline primarily played left guard as he earned second-team all Mid-American Conference honors as the Golden Flashes had their best season in 40 years, going 11–3 overall, winning the MAC East title and playing in the MAC Championship Game, which they lost in double overtime to Northern Illinois University. They earned a berth in the postseason GoDaddy.com Bowl, where they were defeated 17–13 by Arkansas State University.

== Professional career ==
Pre-draft measurables
Height	Weight	40-yard dash	10-yard split	20-yard split	20-yard shuttle	Three-cone drill	Vertical jump	Broad jump	Bench press
6 ft 2 5/8 in (1.90 m)	307 lb (139 kg)	5.12 s	1.76 s	3.00 s	4.59 s	7.66 s	27 in (0.69 m)	8 ft 5 in (2.57 m)	25 reps
All values from Kent State Pro Day

=== New England Patriots ===
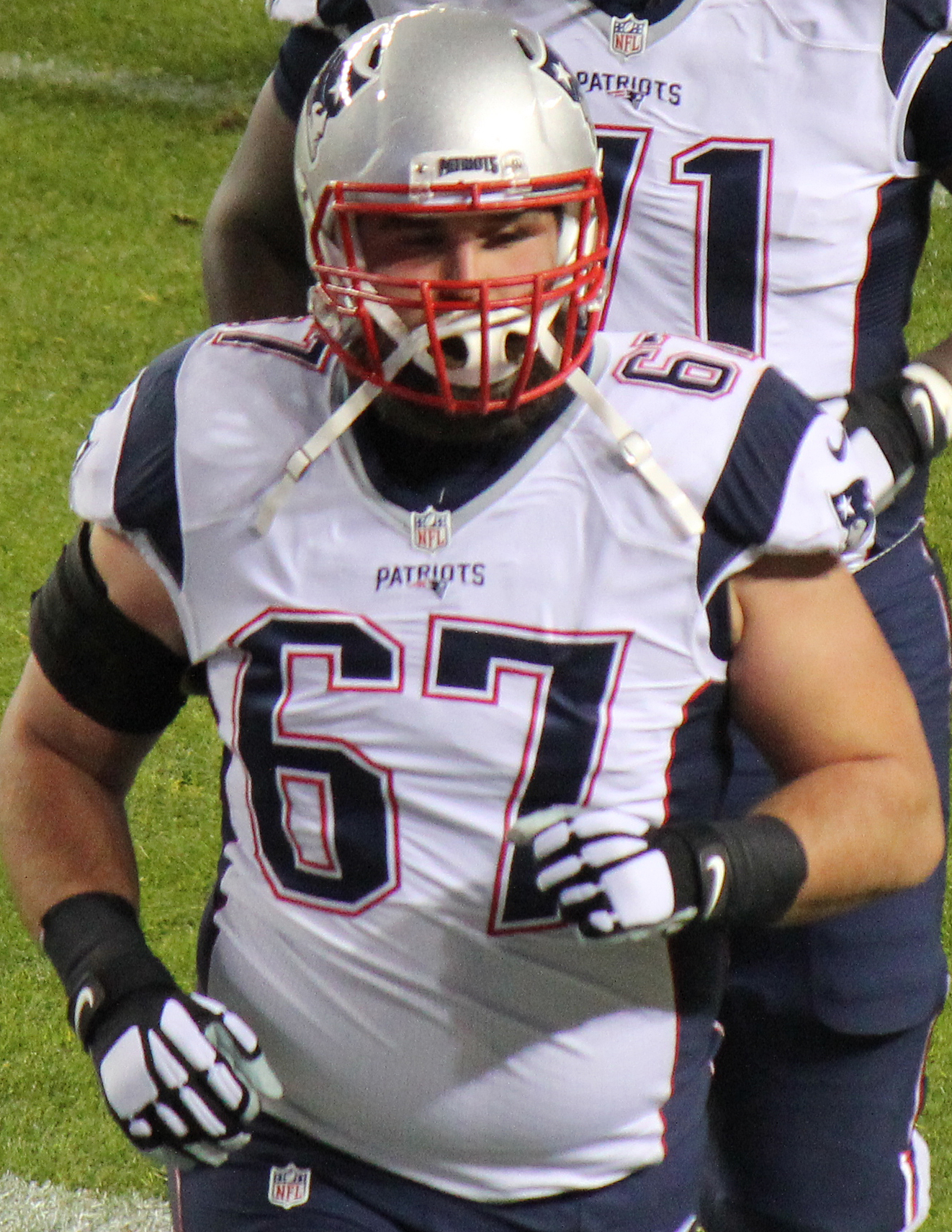
Kline with the New England Patriots in 2015

==== 2013 ====
Kline was projected by some to be chosen in the late rounds of the 2013 NFL draft on April 25–27, 2013. He had private pre-draft workouts with the New England Patriots as well as the New York Jets, Indianapolis Colts, Kansas City Chiefs, Cincinnati Bengals, Tennessee Titans and Oakland Raiders.

He went undrafted, but after the draft ended on April 27, he was signed that day as a rookie free agent by the Patriots. He was released on September 2 but quickly re-signed to the Patriots' practice squad. He was activated for one game against the Buffalo Bills, then returned to the practice squad before again being added to the active roster on November 2. Kline appeared in his first NFL game on November 3 when he entered the game at left guard for the final play, a kneel-down against the Pittsburgh Steelers. He played briefly in the Patriots' 34–31 win December 1 over the Houston Texans.

He saw his first significant playing time in a December 15 game against the Miami Dolphins, when Patriots starting offensive lineman Nate Solder went down with an injury. Kline was inserted into the lineup and played most of the game at left guard, with starting left guard Logan Mankins shifting to left tackle.

Kline made his first start and played the entire game at left guard as the Patriots cruised to a 41–7 win over the Baltimore Ravens on December 22, 2013.

For the season, Kline played in seven regular season games, including one start.

By the end of the season, on the Patriots depth chart, he was listed as the second-team left guard behind starter and six-time Pro Bowl selection Mankins as well as second-team right guard behind Dan Connolly.

==== 2014 ====
Just days before the Patriots' final preseason game, on August 26 the perennial All-Pro Mankins was traded to the Tampa Bay Buccaneers, a move expected to provide an opportunity for increased playing time for Kline, who started the final preseason game. However, after a subpar performance in that game, Kline was on the inactive roster for the regular season opener against the Miami Dolphins. Prior to the Patriots' second game, against the Minnesota Vikings, he was again added to the active roster. and saw action on eight plays in the fourth quarter. He was returned to the inactive list for their next three games

Kline was reactivated for the October 12 Patriots win vs. the Buffalo Bills and started at right guard, his first start of the season and second of his career, playing 71 snaps. Four days later on October 16 he started again at right guard, playing 57 snaps in a Thursday night Patriots win over the New York Jets. He stayed on the active roster and played 23 snaps in a 51–23 win over the Chicago Bears. He remained on the active roster through the regular season finale against the Buffalo Bills, starting one of those games (his third start of the year), and finishing with 12 regular season games played in 2014.

Kline made his first postseason start January 18, 2015 in the AFC Championship Game against the Indianapolis Colts following an injury to rookie center Bryan Stork, which resulted in guard Ryan Wendell moving to center and Kline at right guard. Kline earned praise for his performance as the Patriots dominated the Colts 45–7 to advance to Super Bowl XLIX. Kline then earned a Super Bowl ring as the Patriots defeated the Seattle Seahawks 28–24 in Super Bowl XLIX on February 1, 2015. Kline was one of two Patriots (the other being backup quarterback Jimmy Garoppolo) who was active but did not play any snaps.

==== 2015 ====
In the Patriots' regular-season opener against the Pittsburgh Steelers on September 10, Kline started the game at left guard in the 28-21 Patriots win. In the offense's second series, he was switched to right guard, and rotated between the two positions throughout the game. He was in the lineup for 54 of 61 offensive plays (89 percent).

Through Week 9, Kline started every game for New England, rotating between left and right guard.

On November 10, 2015, the Patriots announced the signing of Kline to a two-year contract extension through the 2017 season.

In the 2015 regular season, Kline played in 14 games, starting 13. He missed two games due to a shoulder injury. Kline played in 816 snaps, or 77.6 percent of the team's offensive plays as the Patriots won their division and the #2 seed in the AFC Playoffs.

Kline underwent shoulder surgery after the completion of the 2015 season. On September 7, 2016, Kline was released by the Patriots.

=== Tennessee Titans ===
==== 2016 ====
On September 8, 2016, Kline was claimed off waivers by the Tennessee Titans. After being inactive for the team's first two games, on September 25, Kline started at right guard in the Titans' 17–10 loss to the Oakland Raiders. He went on to start the rest of the season at right guard to help spearhead a ground game that ran for more than 136 yards per game, good for third in the league. Pro Football Focus awarded the Titans' the Offensive Line of the Year honor. PFF rated Kline an 80.0, 27th among guards.

==== 2017 ====
In 2017 Kline started all 16 games at right guard for the Titans as the team went 9-7 and made the AFC Playoffs for the first time since 2008. The team won its first-round game against the Kansas City Chiefs before losing to Kline's former team and eventual AFC Champion New England Patriots. The offensive line was rated fifth-best in the NFL according to Pro Football Focus, with Kline scoring a 75.8 rating, number 22 among NFL guards.

==== 2018 ====
On March 14, 2018, Kline signed a four-year contract extension with the Tennessee Titans. He started all 16 of the Titans' games at right guard for the second consecutive season as the team finished 9–7.

On March 15, 2019, Kline was released by the Titans.

=== Minnesota Vikings ===
On March 20, 2019, Kline signed a three-year $15.75 million contract with the Minnesota Vikings. played in and started 13 of the Vikings' 16 games, missing games due to a concussion, and a foot injury. Kline was immediately named a starter for the 2019 season. He started the Vikings' first three games; missed the fourth game due to a concussion; started game 5; then he missed game 6 with a foot injury.

On March 18, 2020, Kline was released by the Vikings. He did not play during the 2020 season.

On July 28, 2021, Kline announced his retirement from the NFL.

== Personal life ==
Kline married his wife, Natalie, on April 9, 2016, in Saint Croix, U.S. Virgin Islands.
