= Sunny Ducrow =

1919 novel by English author Henry St. John Cooper

Sunny Ducrow is a 1919 novel by English author Henry St. John Cooper. It follows Elizabeth Ann "Sunny" Ducrow, a pleasant, clever, and driven teenager from the London slums who left her backbreaking factory job to become a stage performer, and later, a successful business owner.

== Main characters ==
- Elizabeth Ann "Sunny" Ducrow: A semi-literate orphan, Sunny was working in a pickle factory at age 16 when a chance encounter with Leslie Montressor led her to become an actress. Sunny's confidence and ambition propelled her upward; her kind and loyal nature won her many friends and connections. She confronted every obstacle with a smile. After her career at the first theatre company ended, she managed to land a job at the Realm, the biggest theatre group in England. After she became one of the biggest stage stars, she even delved into the business world: she invested in her former pickle company and built cottages for the workers.
- Albert "Bert" Jackson: Sunny's best buddy from the slums. A dejected and awkward fellow, he was always supported by Sunny. He later achieved success as a playwright and married Evy.
- Mrs. Melkin: Sunny's aunt and only relative. A grumpy and sentimental widow, she later married Porkey.
- Stanley Alwyn, Viscount Dobrington: Sunny's first love. Despite his aristocratic status he fell for Sunny, but his fickleness and distrust in her ended their relationship.
- Evelyn "Evy" Clifforde: Another actress at the Realm. Once Sunny's rival, she became Sunny's best friend and flatmate. She later married Bert.
- Arthur Curtiss: Mr. Barstowe's secretary. He fell in love with Sunny and they got together by the novel's end.
- Mr. Barstowe: Owner of the Realm and the "King of the Music Hall World". He also farmed on his days "off".
- Lady Blessendale: Countess and Stanley's overprotective mother.
- Max Hemmingway: Theatre manager.
- Felix Rostheimer: Hemmingway's depraved German financer.
- Leslie Montressor: Star performer under Hemmingway who discovered Sunny. She later left for America.
- Mr. Johnson: Owner of the pickle factory.
- Edward "Porkey" Porkberry: Gatekeeper at the Realm. He later married Mrs. Melkin.

== Reception ==
Mary Cadogan considered it an "attractive account." G. I. Colbron of Publishers Weekly praised the writing as "sincere and simple in style". The New York Times wrote: "In Sunny Ducrow Henry St. John barely escapes unwittingly surpassing the 'novels' that first established Stephen Leacock's reputation."

== Adaptation ==
In 1926, the novel was made into a Hollywood film, Sunny Side Up, starring Vera Reynolds as Sunny Ducrow.
