= West of Broadway (1926 film) =

1926 film

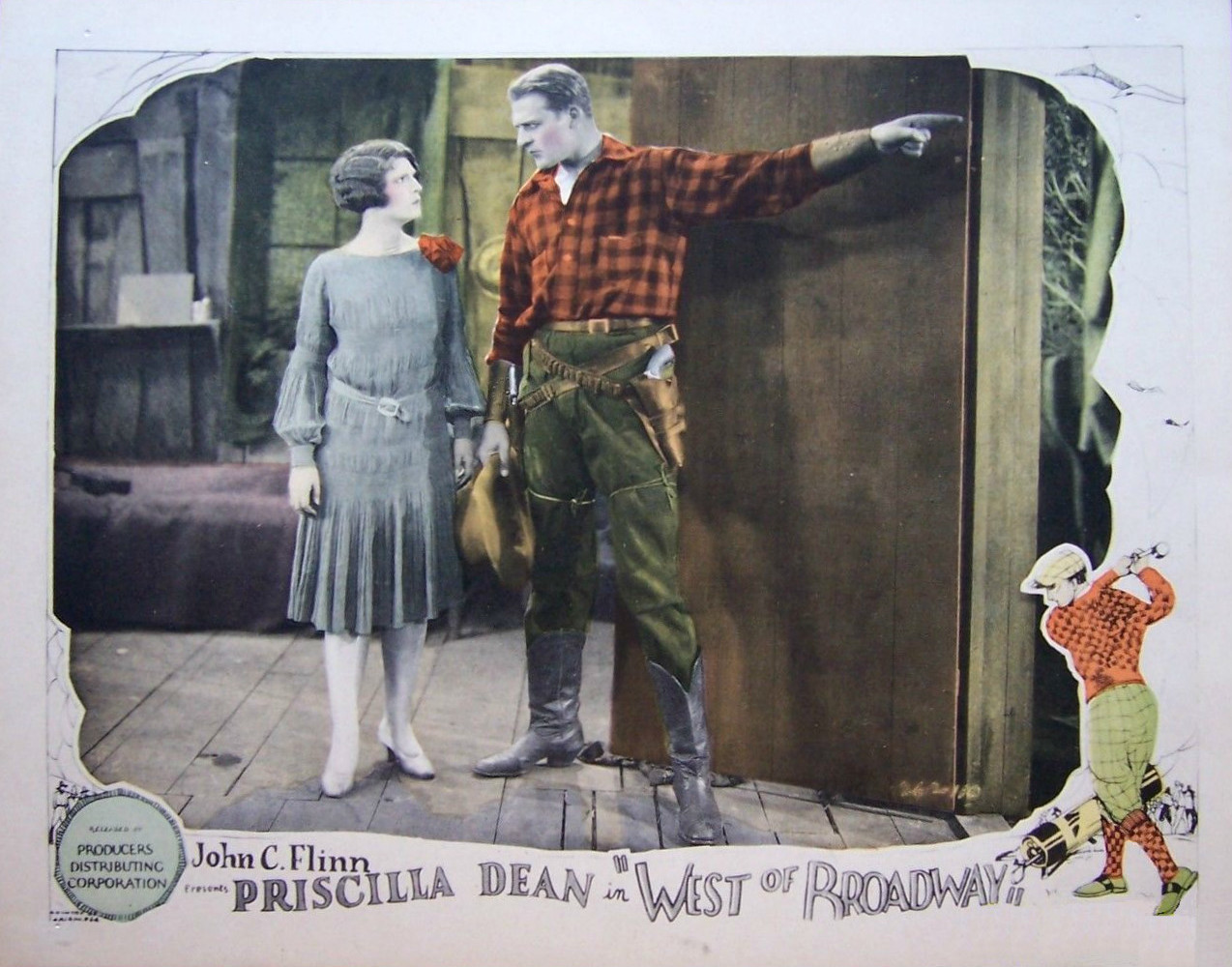
- Lobby card
- Directed by: Robert Thornby
- Written by: Harold Shumate (adaptation); Jack Cunningham (scenario)
- Based on: "New York West" by Wallace Smith
- Produced by: John C. Flinn
- Starring: Priscilla Dean
- Cinematography: Georges Benoît
- Production company: Metropolitan Pictures Corporation of California
- Distributed by: Producers Distributing Corporation
- Release date: October 18, 1926
- Running time: 58 minutes
- Country: United States
- Languages: Silent; English intertitles

West of Broadway is a lost 1926 American silent romantic comedy Western film directed by Robert Thornby and starring Priscilla Dean. It was released through Producers Distributing Corporation. The film was based on the short story "New York West" by Wallace Smith and was adapted for the screen by Harold Shumate.

== Cast ==
- Priscilla Dean as 'Freddie' Hayden
- Arnold Gray as Bruce Elwood
- Majel Coleman as Muriel Styles
- Walter Long as Bad Willie
- George M. Hall as Cherokee Charlie
- William Austin as Mortimer Allison
