= Mason, Ohio =

- City
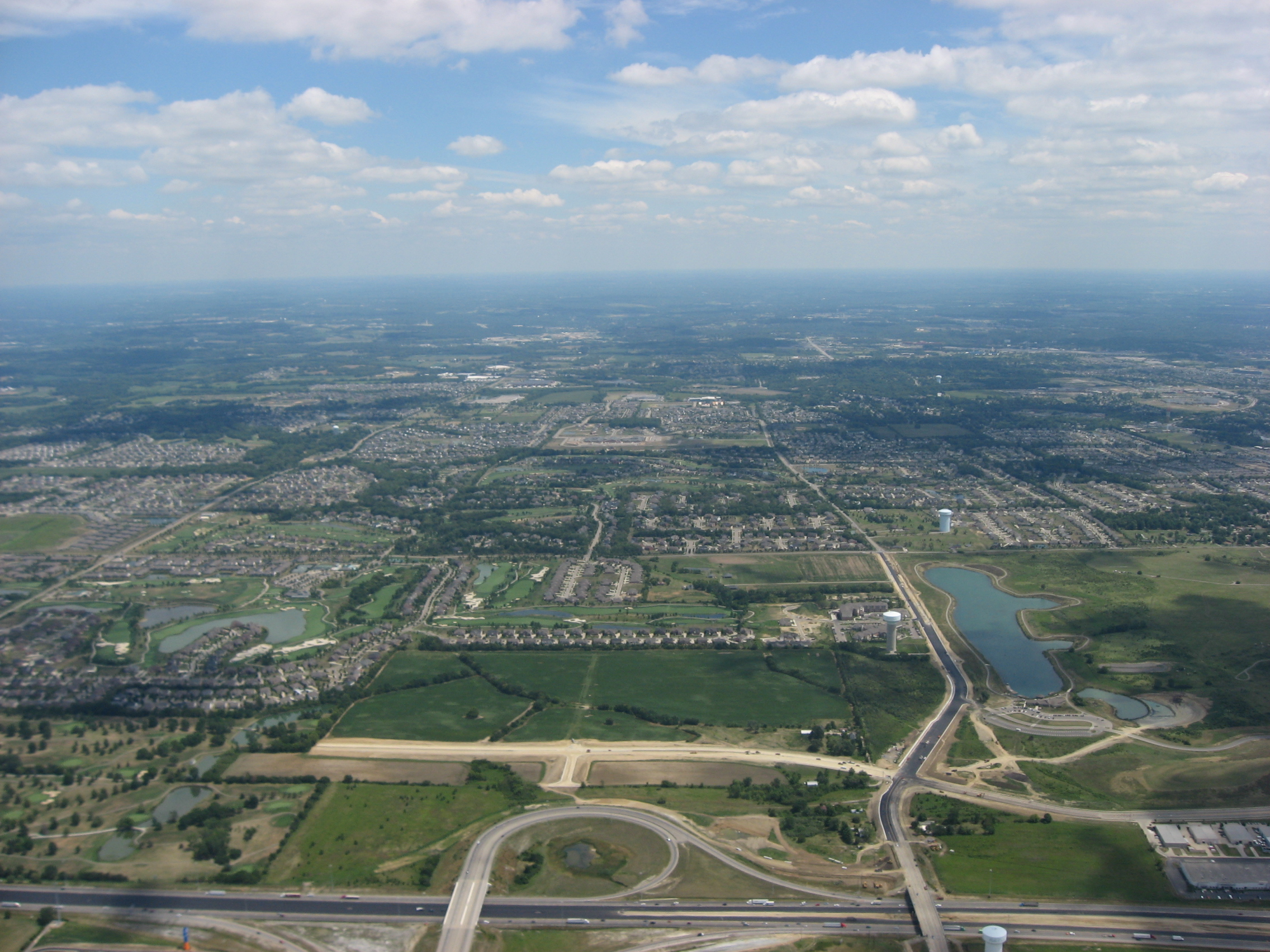
- An aerial view of Mason

- Flag Logo
- Motto: "More than you imagine."
- Interactive map of Mason, Ohio
- Location within Ohio Location within the United States
- Coordinates: 39°22′00″N 84°17′43″W
- Country: United States
- State: Ohio
- County: Warren

Government
  - Type: Council-Manager
  - Mayor: Josh Styrcula
  - City Manager: Eric Hansen

Area
  - Total: 19.28 sq mi (49.93 km^{2})
  - Land: 19.26 sq mi (49.89 km^{2})
  - Water: 0.015 sq mi (0.04 km^{2})
- Elevation: 794 ft (242 m)

Population (2020)
  - Total: 34,792
  - Density: 1,806.3/sq mi (697.41/km^{2})
- Time zone: UTC-5 (Eastern (EST))
  - Summer (DST): UTC-4 (EDT)
- ZIP code: 45040
- Area code: 513
- FIPS code: 39-48188
- GNIS feature ID: 2395039
- Website: imaginemason.org

Mason is a city in southwestern Warren County, Ohio, United States. The population was 34,792 at the 2020 census. Located approximately 22 miles (35 km) north of downtown Cincinnati, it is home to Fortune 500 corporation Cintas, the Kings Island amusement park, and the Lindner Family Tennis Center, home of the Cincinnati Open.

== History ==
On June 1, 1803, Revolutionary War veteran William Mason paid $1,700 at auction to purchase 640 acres (2.6 km^{2}) of land in what is now downtown Mason. In 1815, he platted 16 lots on this land and named the village "Palmyra."

In 1835, a petition was sent to the federal post office to correct the name of the town. The town had been listed as Kirkwood, possibly an error because the postmaster at the time was named William Kirkwood. When village officials were informed that there was another Palmyra in Ohio, the name was officially changed to "Mason."

In 1923, Main Street was paved, prompting a celebration throughout the town.

Mason remained a small farming community for another 125 years. In 1970, a year before the town was incorporated to become a city, there were fewer than 5,700 residents.

In February 1997, Mason withdrew from surrounding Deerfield Township by forming a paper township called Mason Township.

=== Voice of America ===
In 1928 the 50,000 watt, 831-foot WLW-AM tower was built on Tylersville Road. Six years after its construction, President Franklin Roosevelt ordered the station's equipment be upgraded to operate at 500,000 watts, making it the most powerful broadcast station in the country at the time, powerful enough to broadcast across the Atlantic ocean. This proved bothersome for locals, as they could hear the broadcast through their bedsprings, downspouts, and fencing.

In 1939, after complaints from other radio stations due to signal interference, the power was reduced back to 50,000 watts after the Federal Communications Commission chose not to renew the station's experimental broadcasting license. This decision was appealed by the Crosley Corporation, the company who operated the tower, and taken all the way to the Supreme Court, where it was denied.

== Geography ==
According to the United States Census Bureau, the city has a total area of 18.67 square miles (48.36 km^{2}), of which 18.63 square miles (48.25 km^{2}) is land and 0.04 square miles (0.10 km^{2}) is water. The city has a short border along the Little Miami River.

=== Climate ===
Climate data for Mason, Ohio
Month	Jan	Feb	Mar	Apr	May	Jun	Jul	Aug	Sep	Oct	Nov	Dec	Year
Record high °F (°C)	72 (22)	76 (24)	84 (29)	89 (32)	93 (34)	97 (36)	104 (40)	101 (38)	98 (37)	88 (31)	81 (27)	75 (24)	104 (40)
Mean daily maximum °F (°C)	38 (3)	43 (6)	53 (12)	65 (18)	75 (24)	83 (28)	87 (31)	86 (30)	79 (26)	68 (20)	54 (12)	43 (6)	65 (18)
Mean daily minimum °F (°C)	19 (−7)	21 (−6)	30 (−1)	39 (4)	49 (9)	58 (14)	63 (17)	61 (16)	53 (12)	41 (5)	32 (0)	24 (−4)	41 (5)
Record low °F (°C)	−25 (−32)	−13 (−25)	−10 (−23)	18 (−8)	27 (−3)	36 (2)	40 (4)	41 (5)	26 (−3)	12 (−11)	−3 (−19)	−22 (−30)	−25 (−32)
Average precipitation inches (mm)	3.18 (81)	2.72 (69)	3.73 (95)	4.10 (104)	4.96 (126)	4.54 (115)	4.04 (103)	4.18 (106)	3.14 (80)	3.09 (78)	3.65 (93)	3.35 (85)	44.68 (1,135)
Source: The Weather Channel

== Demographics ==
=== Racial and ethnic composition ===
Mason, Ohio – Racial and ethnic composition Note: the US Census treats Hispanic/Latino as an ethnic category. This table excludes Latinos from the racial categories and assigns them to a separate category. Hispanics/Latinos may be of any race.
Race / Ethnicity (NH = Non-Hispanic)	Pop 2000	Pop 2010	Pop 2020	% 2000	% 2010	% 2020
White alone (NH)	20,705	25,434	23,636	94.05%	82.81%	67.94%
Black or African American alone (NH)	353	990	1,461	1.60%	3.22%	4.20%
Native American or Alaska Native alone (NH)	42	36	48	0.19%	0.12%	0.14%
Asian alone (NH)	480	2,754	6,398	2.18%	8.97%	18.39%
Native Hawaiian or Pacific Islander alone (NH)	2	35	80	0.01%	0.11%	0.23%
Other race alone (NH)	19	50	143	0.09%	0.16%	0.41%
Mixed race or Multiracial (NH)	202	425	1,472	0.92%	1.38%	4.23%
Hispanic or Latino (any race)	213	988	1,554	0.97%	3.22%	4.47%
Total	22,016	30,712	34,792	100.00%	100.00%	100.00%

Historical population
Census	Pop.	Note	%±
1850	431		—
1860	441		2.3%
1870	387		−12.2%
1880	431		11.4%
1890	564		30.9%
1900	629		11.5%
1910	737		17.2%
1920	816		10.7%
1930	854		4.7%
1940	902		5.6%
1950	1,196		32.6%
1960	4,727		295.2%
1970	5,677		20.1%
1980	8,692		53.1%
1990	11,452		31.8%
2000	22,019		92.3%
2010	30,712		39.5%
2020	34,792		13.3%
2025 (est.)	35,834		3.0%

=== 2020 census ===
As of the 2020 census, Mason had a population of 34,792, for a population density of 1,806.25 inhabitants per square mile (697.4/km^{2}). The median age was 40.5 years; 26.1% of residents were under the age of 18 and 13.9% of residents were 65 years of age or older. For every 100 females there were 94.0 males, and for every 100 females age 18 and over there were 91.3 males age 18 and over.

Nearly all of Mason's residents (99.5%) lived in urban areas while 0.5% lived in rural areas.

There were 12,617 households in Mason, of which 39.2% had children under the age of 18 living in them. Of all households, 62.3% were married-couple households, 12.1% were households with a male householder and no spouse or partner present, and 21.6% were households with a female householder and no spouse or partner present. About 22.8% of all households were made up of individuals, and 10.7% had someone living alone who was 65 years of age or older. There were 13,052 housing units, of which 3.3% were vacant; the homeowner vacancy rate was 0.8% and the rental vacancy rate was 5.9%.

Racial composition as of the 2020 census
Race	Number	Percent
White	23,878	68.6%
Black or African American	1,467	4.2%
American Indian and Alaska Native	76	0.2%
Asian	6,408	18.4%
Native Hawaiian and Other Pacific Islander	80	0.2%
Some other race	586	1.7%
Two or more races	2,297	6.6%
Hispanic or Latino (of any race)	1,554	4.5%

=== 2016-2020 American Community Survey ===
According to the U.S. Census American Community Survey, for the period 2016-2020 the estimated median annual income for a household in the city was $121,082, and the median income for a family was $140,991. About 3.8% of the population were living below the poverty line, including 4.1% of those under age 18 and 2.8% of those age 65 or over. About 66.1% of the population were employed, and 61.8% had a bachelor's degree or higher.

=== 2010 census ===
As of the 2010 census, there were 30,712 residents, 11,016 households, and 8,205 families residing in the city. The population density was 1,648.5 inhabitants per square mile (636.5/km^{2}). There were 11,471 housing units at an average density of 615.7 per square mile (237.7/km^{2}). The racial makeup of the city was 85.1% White, 3.3% African American, 0.2% Native American, 9.0% Asian, 0.1% Pacific Islander, 0.8% from other races, and 1.5% from two or more races. Hispanic or Latino of any race were 3.2% of the population.

There were 11,016 households, of which 44.5% had children under the age of 18 living with them, 63.4% were married couples living together, 8.4% had a female householder with no husband present, 2.7% had a male householder with no wife present, and 25.5% were non-families. 22.4% of all households were made up of individuals, and 8.3% had someone living alone who was 65 years of age or older. The average household size was 2.77 and the average family size was 3.30.

The median age in the city was 38.4 years. 30.8% of residents were under the age of 18; 5.7% were between the ages of 18 and 24; 26.1% were from 25 to 44; 27.4% were from 45 to 64; and 9.9% were 65 years of age or older. The gender makeup of the city was 48.5% male and 51.5% female.

=== 2000 census ===
As of the 2000 census, there were 22,016 residents, 7,789 households, and 5,981 families residing in the city. The population density was 1,250.0 inhabitants per square mile (482.6/km^{2}). There were 8,111 housing units at an average density of 460.5 per square mile (177.8/km^{2}). The racial makeup of the city was 94.79% White, 1.61% African American, 0.19% Native American, 2.18% Asian, 0.01% Pacific Islander, 0.30% from other races, and 0.93% from two or more races. Hispanic or Latino of any race were 0.97% of the population.

There were 7,789 households 45.2% of which had children under the age of 18, 67.5% had married couples living together, 6.8% had a female householder with no husband present, and 23.2% were non-families. 20.0% of all households were made up of individuals, and 6.7% had someone living alone who was 65 years of age or older. The average household size was 2.80 persons and the average family size was 3.27 persons.

In the city, the population was spread out, with 32.1% under the age of 18, 5.1% between 18 and 24, 35.3% between 25 and 44, 19.1% between 45 and 64, and 8.4% over the age of 65. The median age was 34 years. For every 100 females, there were 95.7 males. For every 100 females age 18 and over, there were 92.4 males.

== Economy ==
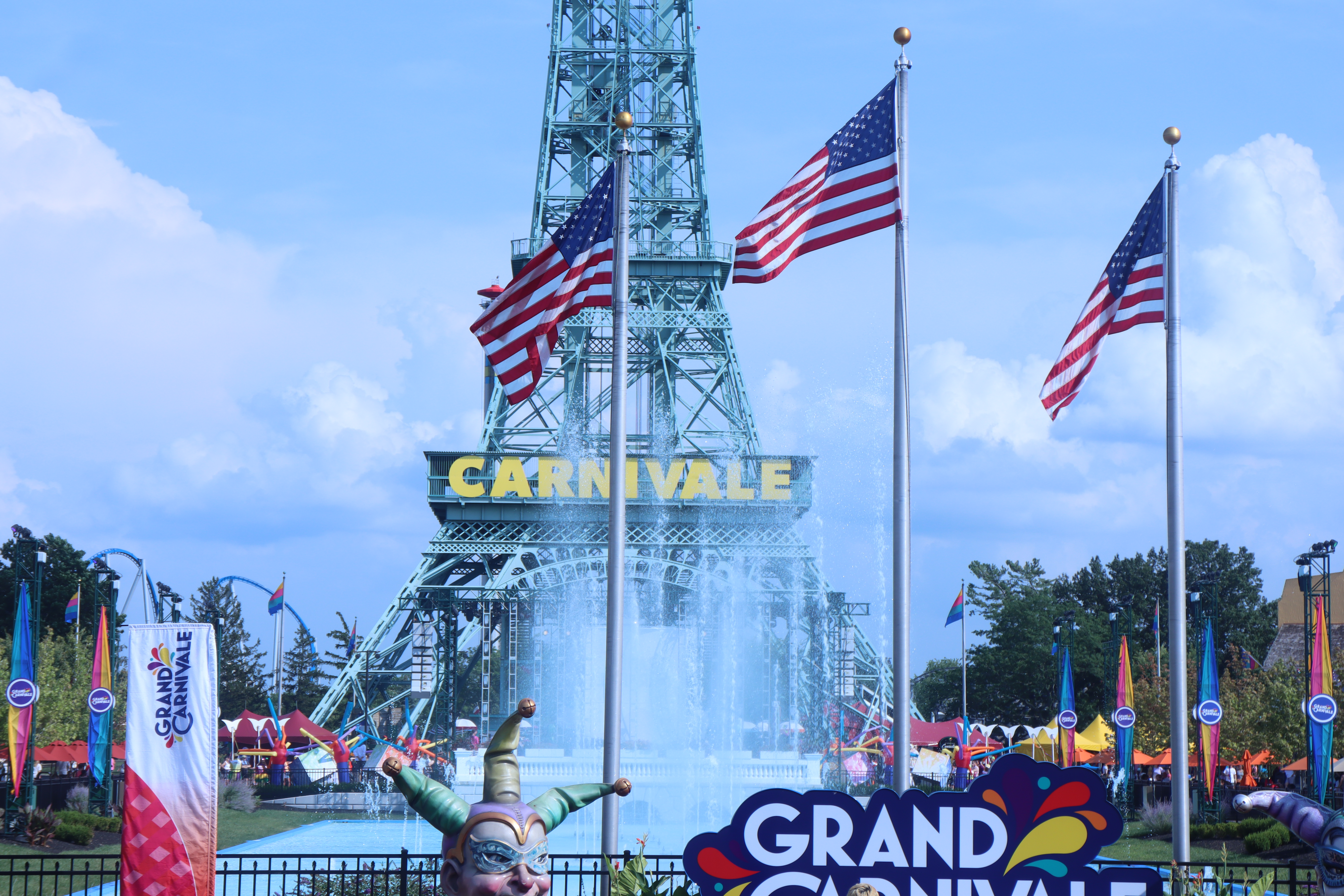
The Eiffel Tower at Kings Island

Tourist attractions in Mason include Kings Island amusement park and its Soak City water park, Great Wolf Lodge indoor water park and resort, and The Lindner Family Tennis Center, which hosts the historic Cincinnati Open tennis tournament, one of the top nine in the world within the ATP Tour Masters 1000 series.

Mason's largest employers include the Procter & Gamble Mason Business Center, the headquarters of Luxottica Retail and Cintas corporate headquarters. Other notable companies with large operations in Mason are Mitsubishi Electric, L-3 Communications, Heinz, and Prasco Laboratories.

Over 500 businesses operate in Mason. More than 90 corporations have headquarters or manufacturing operations in Mason's 24 commerce parks.

== Arts and culture ==
The Mason Veterans Memorial, adjacent to the Mason Municipal Center, was dedicated on Saturday, November 8, 2003. Neil Armstrong, a Korean War veteran and the first man to walk on the Moon, was the guest of honor. The main feature of the memorial is a set of 10 pillars representing the 10 major conflicts in American history. The height of each pillar is proportional to the number of casualties in the war. The memorial also features an eternal flame.

Mason has a lending library, the Mason Public Library, which received an expansion in 2013.

In April 2024, President Russell M. Nelson of The Church of Jesus Christ of Latter-day Saints announced the Cincinnati Ohio Temple, the Church's first temple in southern Ohio. The Church later announced that the temple would be built in Mason, on Mason-Montgomery Road.

== Parks and recreation ==
Mason is home to seven city parks, covering about 300 acres. These include fishing lakes, walking trails, ball fields, tennis courts, picnic shelters, and playgrounds. The 199,000 square-foot multi-use Mason Community Center, which opened in 2003, is one of the largest public recreation facilities in the state. It has two pools, a gymnasium, a field house, a fitness center, a walking track, a senior center, exergames, a climbing wall, and classroom and meeting areas. A continually expanding network of bike paths connect neighborhoods to schools, parks and downtown. An outdoor recreation center began construction in 2019, which includes an enclosed 50 meter pool, a 203,000 gallon heated leisure pool, an interactive splash pad, a lazy river, and a 1,100 square foot event space.

== Government ==
City council is the legislative body of Mason's city government, and a city manager is appointed by council. Three or four council members are elected in odd-numbered years and serve four-year terms. City government is housed primarily at the Mason Municipal Center, a 120,000 square-foot, two-story facility which opened in fall 2002. Its most distinct feature is a 51-foot-high central atrium. The facility houses Mason Municipal Court, the police and fire departments, a community meeting room and all other city departments except public works and public utilities.

The Mason Police Department is accredited by the Commission on Accreditation for Law Enforcement Agencies (CALEA). The department employs 39 full-time sworn police officers, including the chief, two assistant chiefs, four lieutenants, and four sergeants. Additionally, the department has seven non-sworn support personnel, including two court security officers. The City of Mason Police Department operates 17 fully equipped marked police cruisers, eight unmarked police cars, and one D.A.R.E. car. In addition, the department operates several special purpose vehicles, including motorcycles, bicycles, and Segways.

The Mason Fire Department has more than 50 fire and emergency medical personnel, including the fire chief, four deputy chiefs, administrative staff, fire inspectors, and full or part-time firefighters. Firefighters are also trained as paramedics or emergency medical technicians (EMTs). The department has two pumpers, one 100-foot ladder truck, one 100-foot tower ladder, one heavy rescue/hazardous materials truck, four paramedic ambulances, one paramedic response car, and additional staff vehicles. These vehicles respond from one of the city's two fire stations.

== Education ==
Mason City Schools is consistently one of the highest-rated school districts in the state, with a rating of 26 out of 26 indicators on the 2011-2012 Ohio Report Card.

Mason has five public schools: Mason Early Childhood Center (pre-K to 2nd grade), Mason Elementary School (grades 3-4), Mason Intermediate School (grades 5-6), Mason Middle School (grades 7-8), and William Mason High School. Mason also has a community center that is connected to the high school. The last building to open was Mason Elementary School, which opened in 2019.

Mason is also home to Sinclair Community College's Sinclair in Mason campus since 2007. The facility is located on 75 acres near I-71. It serves about 1,400 students as of 2024.

== Media ==
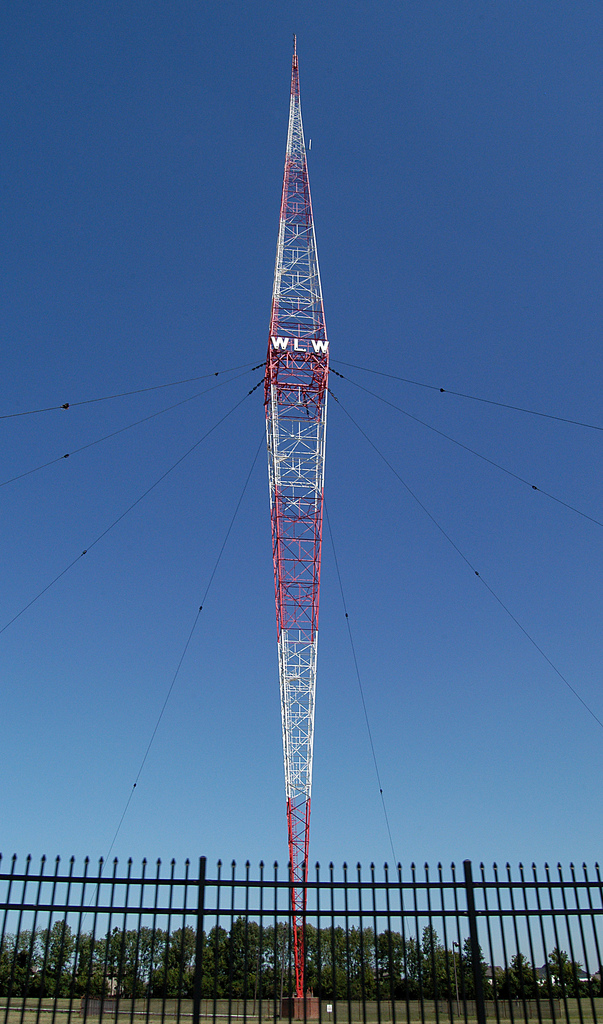
WLW Tower

Mason is part of the Cincinnati media market. Although no broadcast stations are licensed to Mason itself, the city is home to the transmitter site of iHeartMedia, Inc.-owned WLW (AM 700, licensed to Cincinnati), which uses one of only seven remaining Blaw-Knox diamond-shaped towers. WLW was once (from 1934 to 1939) the most powerful broadcast station in the country at 500 kilowatts.

== Notable people ==
- George Clooney, actor
- Majel Coleman, actress and model
- Brant Daugherty, actor
- Carson Foster, swimmer
- Josh Kline, National Football League offensive lineman
- Dan Patrick, journalist, TV and radio host
- Carson Williams, electrical engineer
- T.J. Zeuch, baseball player
