= Ella Stuart Carson =

American screenwriter (1800–??)

- Born: Cora Ella Carson; 1880; Hebron, Indiana, USA
- Died: Unknown
- Education: Indiana University
- Occupations: Screenwriter, journalist
- Years active: 1917–1921
- Spouse: R. Cecil Smith

Ella Stuart Carson (born Cora Ella Carson) was an American screenwriter active during Hollywood's early silent days.

== Biography ==
Ella was born in Hebron, Indiana, to James Carson and Mary Jane Stuart. She attended the Indiana University intent on becoming a teacher, but afterward, she embarked on a career as a newspaperwoman, working at The Chicago Tribune and The Albuquerque Journal.

By the mid-1910s, she and her husband, R. Cecil Smith, got work writing scripts at Thomas H. Ince's studio. The pair—who reportedly wrote over 100 screenplays together—filed a trademark in 1920 to have the rest of their screenplays jointly credited to "the R. Cecil Smiths."

== Filmography ==
- Gilded Lies (1921)
- The Fighter (1921)
- Worlds Apart (1921)
- Broadway and Home (1920)
- A Fool and His Money (1920)
- What's Your Husband Doing? (1920)
- The Law of Men (1919)
- The Law of the North (1918)
- Green Eyes (1918)
- The Claws of the Hun (1918)
- His Mother's Boy (1917)
- Love Letters (1917)
- The Price Mark (1917)
