= The Czarina's Secret =

1928 film

- Directed by: R. William Neill
- Written by: Russell Hickson
- Produced by: Herbert T. Kalmus
- Starring: Olga Baclanova; Sally Rand; Lucio Flamma; David Mir
- Production companies: Metro-Goldwyn-Mayer; Technicolor Corporation
- Distributed by: Metro-Goldwyn-Mayer
- Release date: March 17, 1928
- Country: United States
- Languages: Silent; English Intertitles
- Budget: $20,068.54

The Czarina's Secret is a 1928 MGM silent fictionalized film short in two-color Technicolor. It was the fourth film produced as part of Metro-Goldwyn-Mayer's "Great Events" series.

== Production ==
The film was shot over five days at the Tec-Art Studio in Hollywood. The budget, slightly over $20,000, made it one of the more "higher priced productions" in the "Great Events" series. Cast members Sally Rand and Lucio Flamma had appeared in Technicolor sequences for Cecil B. deMille's The King of Kings less than a year earlier. As with the previous "Great Events" production, The Lady of Victories, The Czarina's Secret made extensive, experimental use of night scenes.

== Release ==
The released version of The Czarina's Secret was well-reviewed, prompting Film Spectator to state that "Technicolor has brought its process to a point of perfection that our big producers can not ignore much longer," and surmising that audience demand for Technicolor would soon be on the increase.

== Preservation status ==
The Czarina's Secret is considered a lost film.
