= The Silent Man =

The Silent Man may refer to:

- The Silent Man (film), a 1917 Western silent film
- The Silent Man, a 2009 thriller novel by Alex Berenson
- Mark Felt: The Man Who Brought Down the White House, a 2017 film filmed under the working title The Silent Man
- "The Silent Man", a song by Dream Theater from the album Awake
