= Jan of the Big Snows =

1922 film

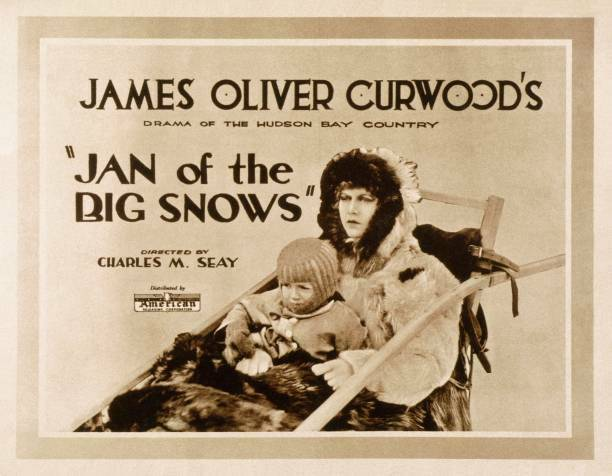
- Directed by: Charles M. Seay
- Written by: James Oliver Curwood (story); Frederick Gaye
- Produced by: Charles M. Seay
- Starring: Warner Richmond; Louise Prussing; Richard Neill
- Production company: Dirigo Films
- Distributed by: American Releasing Corporation
- Release date: March 12, 1922
- Running time: 50 minutes
- Country: United States
- Languages: Silent; English intertitles

Jan of the Big Snows is a 1922 American silent northern drama film directed by Charles M. Seay and starring Warner Richmond, Louise Prussing and Richard Neill.

== Cast ==
- Warner Richmond as Jan Allaire
- Louise Prussing as Nancy Cummings
- William Peavey as Frederick Cummings
- Baby Eastman Haywood as Freddie
- Frank Robbins as Mukee
- Richard Neill as Blanding

== Bibliography ==
- Connelly, Robert B. The Silents: Silent Feature Films, 1910-36, Volume 40, Issue 2. December Press, 1998.
- Munden, Kenneth White. The American Film Institute Catalog of Motion Pictures Produced in the United States, Part 1. University of California Press, 1997.
