= The Woman in White (1929 film) =

1929 film

- Directed by: Herbert Wilcox
- Written by: Robert Cullen; Herbert Wilcox
- Based on: The Woman in White; 1860 novel by Wilkie Collins
- Produced by: Herbert Wilcox
- Starring: Blanche Sweet; Haddon Mason; Cecil Humphreys; Louise Prussing
- Cinematography: David Kesson
- Edited by: Harry Chandlee
- Production company: British & Dominions Film Corporation
- Distributed by: Woolf & Freedman Film Service
- Release dates: January 1929 (UK); 24 May 1929 (US)
- Running time: 67 minutes
- Country: United Kingdom
- Languages: Silent; English intertitles

The Woman in White is a 1929 British silent mystery film directed by Herbert Wilcox (whose main career was as a producer) and starring Blanche Sweet, Haddon Mason and Cecil Humphreys. It was written by Robert Cullen and Herbert Wilcox, based on the 1859 mystery novel The Woman in White by Wilkie Collins.

The film was made at Cricklewood Studios in London and was the first British film version of the novel. Some sources disagree on whether the film was actually made in England or in Scotland, however.

== Plot ==
A recently married heiress named Laura Fairlie keeps seeing visions of a woman in white around her estate. Laura is unaware that her husband Sir Percival Glyde is plotting to steal her inheritance. Her sister Marion learns of the plot, but falls ill before she can warn Laura. When Marion recovers from her illness, she learns that Laura has died and has been buried. Laura's old boyfriend Walter Hartwright discovers however that Laura isn't really dead. It seems Laura had a lookalike (the woman in white) who actually died, and Laura's husband had Laura committed to an insane asylum and pretended that it was she who died.

== Cast ==
- Blanche Sweet - Laura Fairlie / Anne (a dual role)
- Haddon Mason - Walter Hartwright
- Cecil Humphreys - Sir Percival Glyde
- Louise Prussing - Marion Halcombe
- Frank Perfitt - Count Fosco
- Minna Grey - Countess Fosco

== Production ==
The film's art direction was by Clifford Pember. Blanche Sweet played the dual role of both Laura (the heiress) and her lookalike (the woman in white).

== Other Versions ==
Several silent versions were made, two in 1912 and one by Fox in 1917 entitled Tangled Lives. Another 1917 silent version was filmed by Thanhouser and starred Florence La Badie, which still survives in the Library of Congress. It was remade again in England in 1940 as a horror film called Crimes at the Dark House (starring Tod Slaughter), and remade yet again in 1948.

== Bibliography ==
- Low, Rachael. History of the British Film, 1918-1929. George Allen & Unwin, 1971.
- Wood, Linda. British Films, 1927-1939. British Film Institute, 1986.
