= Fog Bound =

1923 film by Irvin Willat

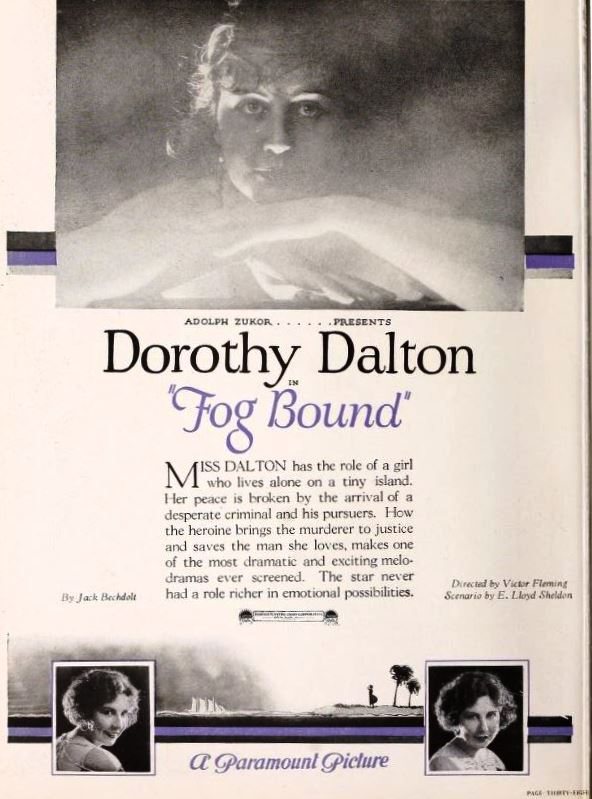
- Trade advertisement announcing film
- Directed by: Irvin Willat
- Screenplay by: Jack Bechdolt; Paul Dickey
- Produced by: Adolph Zukor
- Starring: Dorothy Dalton; David Powell; Martha Mansfield; Maurice Costello; Jack Richardson; Ella Miller; Willard Cooley
- Cinematography: Henry Cronjager
- Production company: Famous Players–Lasky Corporation
- Distributed by: Paramount Pictures
- Release date: May 27, 1923
- Running time: 60 minutes
- Country: United States
- Language: Silent (English intertitles)

Fog Bound is a 1923 American silent drama film directed by Irvin Willat and written by Jack Bechdolt and Paul Dickey. The film stars Dorothy Dalton, David Powell, Martha Mansfield, Maurice Costello, Jack Richardson, Ella Miller, and Willard Cooley. The film was released on May 27, 1923, by Paramount Pictures.

== Cast ==
- Dorothy Dalton as Gale Brenon
- David Powell as Roger Wainright
- Martha Mansfield as Mildred Van Buren
- Maurice Costello as Deputy Brown
- Jack Richardson as Sheriff Holmes
- Ella Miller as Mammy
- Willard Cooley as Deputy Kane
- William David as Gordon Phillips
- Warren Cook as Revenue Officer Brenon
