= His Wife's Friend =

1919 film by Joe De Grasse

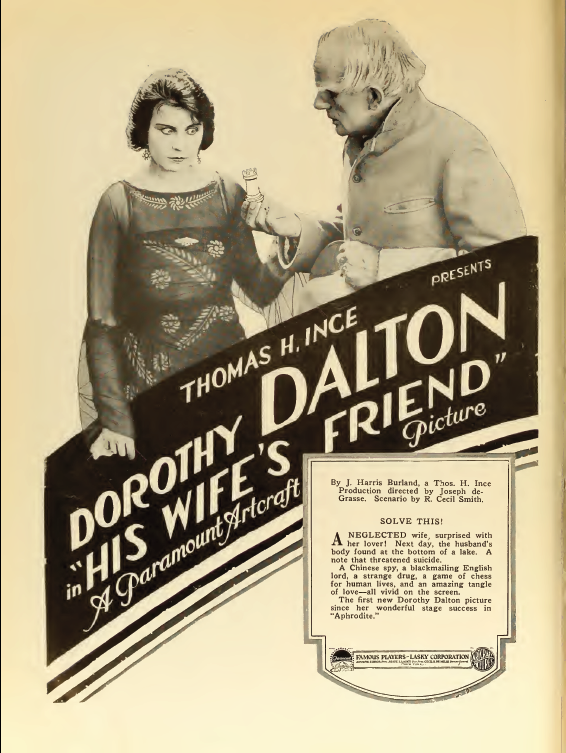
- Ad for film
- Directed by: Joe De Grasse
- Screenplay by: John Burland Harris-Burland; R. Cecil Smith
- Produced by: Thomas H. Ince
- Starring: Dorothy Dalton; Warren Cook; Henry Mortimer; Richard Neill; S. Barrett; William A. Williams
- Cinematography: John Stumar
- Edited by: Ralph Dixon
- Production companies: Thomas H. Ince Productions; Famous Players–Lasky Corporation
- Distributed by: Paramount Pictures
- Release date: December 21, 1919
- Running time: 60 minutes
- Country: United States
- Language: Silent (English intertitles)

His Wife's Friend is a lost 1919 American silent mystery film directed by Joe De Grasse and written by John Burland Harris-Burland and R. Cecil Smith. The film stars Dorothy Dalton, Warren Cook, Henry Mortimer, Richard Neill, S. Barrett, and William A. Williams. The film was released on December 21, 1919, by Paramount Pictures.

== Plot ==
As described in a film magazine, Lady Marion Grimwood finds little congeniality in her union with Sir Robert Grimwood and welcomes the innocent attentions of John Heritage when he shows an interest in her. The sudden death of her husband by drowning is apparently explained when she receives a note claiming that Sir Robert knew of her attachment to John before his death. While she ponders over this, unwilling to believe in its entirety, she is attacked by Sir Waiverly, whose attempt to kill her is blocked. It is then discovered that a Chinese man, Ling Foo, possesses a poison that paralyzes will power. This, it is discovered, was the cause of Sir Robert's death. With this last obstacle removed, Lady Marion and John look forward to a life of happiness.

== Cast ==
- Dorothy Dalton as Lady Marion Grimwood
- Warren Cook as Sir Robert Grimwood
- Henry Mortimer as John Heritage
- Richard Neill as Lord Waverly (credited as Richard Neil)
- S. Barrett as Insp. Marsh
- William A. Williams as Dr. Larner (credited as William Williams)
- Tom Cameron as Nind
- Paul Cazeneuve as Ling Foo
