= Madame du Barry (disambiguation) =

Madame du Barry was a mistress of King Louis XV of France.

Madame du Barry may also refer to films about her life:

- Madame Du Barry (1917 film), starring Theda Bara
- Madame DuBarry (1919 film), a German production directed by Ernst Lubitsch and featuring Pola Negri
- Madame du Barry (1928 film), a 1928 MGM short silent film
- Madame Du Barry (1934 film), starring Delores del Rio
- Madame du Barry (1954 film), a French film

== See also ==
- Madame du Barry#In popular culture, for other films
