= A Fool and His Money (1920 film) =

1920 film directed by Robert Ellis

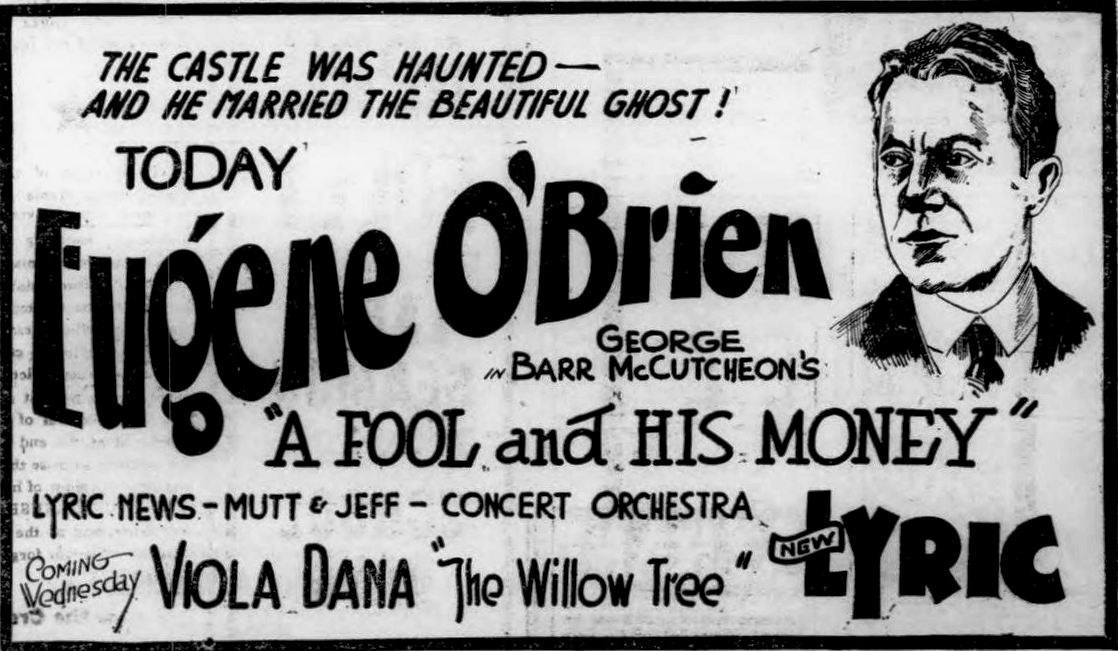
- contemporary advert
- Directed by: Robert Ellis
- Written by: Ella Stuart Carson
- Based on: novel, A Fool and His Money, by George Barr McCutcheon c.1913
- Produced by: Lewis J. Selznick
- Cinematography: Jack Brown; Walter Arthur
- Production company: Selznick Pictures
- Distributed by: Select Pictures
- Release date: March 29, 1920
- Running time: 5 or 6 reels
- Country: United States
- Language: Silent (English intertitles)

A Fool and His Money is a lost 1920 American silent drama film directed by actor Robert Ellis and starring Eugene O'Brien. It was produced at Lewis J. Selznick studios and distributed by the Select Film Company.

The film was remade in 1925 with William Haines in O'Brien's role.

== Cast ==
- Eugene O'Brien as John B. Smart
- Rubye De Remer as Aline
- Emile La Croix as Mr. Schmick
- Anne Brody as Mrs. Schmick
- Finnstron Erics as Schmick's son
- George Dowling as Schmicks's Elder Son
- Frank Goldsmith as Dr. Hazzard
- Wray Page as Mrs. Hazzard
- Ned Hay as Billy Smith
- Louise Prussing as Mrs. Smith
- Arthur Housman as Count Tarnowsky
- Charles Craig as Secretary Poopendyke
- Jules Cowles as Benton
- Elizabeth Garrison as Mrs. Titus
