= A Manhattan Knight =

1920 film by George Beranger

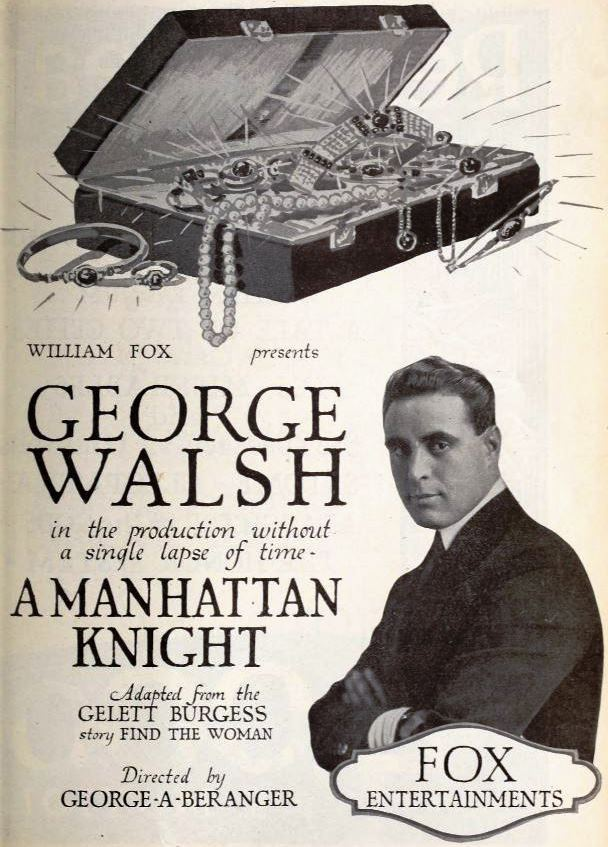
- Advertising of A Manhattan Knight on page 13 of the Exhibitors Herald (March 6, 1920).
- Directed by: George Beranger
- Written by: Paul Sloane (scenario); George Beranger (scenario)
- Based on: Find the Woman by Gelett Burgess
- Produced by: William Fox
- Starring: George Walsh; Virginia Hammond; William H. Budd; Warren Cook; Jack Hopkins; William T. Hayes
- Cinematography: John W. Boyle
- Production company: Fox Film Corporation
- Distributed by: Fox Film Corporation
- Release date: March 1920
- Running time: 5 reels
- Country: United States
- Languages: Silent film (English intertitles)

A Manhattan Knight is a 1920 American silent mystery film directed by George Beranger and starring George Walsh, Virginia Hammond, William H. Budd, Warren Cook, Jack Hopkins, and William T. Hayes. It is based on the 1911 novel Find the Woman by Gelett Burgess. The film was released by Fox Film Corporation in March 1920.

== Cast ==
- George Walsh as John Fenton
- Virginia Hammond as Belle Charmion
- William H. Budd as Gordon Brewster
- Warren Cook as Their Uncle
- Jack Hopkins as Crook Butler
- William T. Hayes as The Family Doctor
- Cedric Ellis as A Medium
- Charles Slattery as Detective
- Louis Wolheim as Mangus O'Shea
- John Raymond as Stool Pigeon
- Walter Mann as Sproul
- Pauline Garon as His Daughter
- Billy Sullivan as Her Sweetheart
- L.J. O'Connor as Another Detective

== Preservation ==
It is unknown whether the film survives as no copies have been located, likely lost.
