= Is Money Everything? =

- Directed by: Glen Lyons
- Written by: Glen Lyons
- Starring: Norman Kerry; Miriam Cooper; Martha Mansfield
- Cinematography: Alvin Knechtel
- Production company: D.M. Film Corporation
- Distributed by: Lee-Bradford Corporation
- Release date: February 1, 1923
- Running time: 58 minutes
- Country: United States
- Languages: Silent; English intertitles

Is Money Everything? is a 1923 American silent drama film directed by Glen Lyons and starring Norman Kerry, Miriam Cooper and Martha Mansfield.

== Cast ==
- Norman Kerry as John Brand
- Miriam Cooper as Marion Brand
- Andrew Hicks as Sam Slack
- John Sylvester as Rev. John Brooks
- Martha Mansfield as Mrs. Justine Pelham
- William Bailey as Roy Pelham
- Lawrence Brooke as Phil Graham

== Bibliography ==
- Lowe, Denise. An Encyclopedic Dictionary of Women in Early American Films: 1895-1930. Routledge, 2014.
