= What's Your Husband Doing? =

1920 film by Lloyd Ingraham

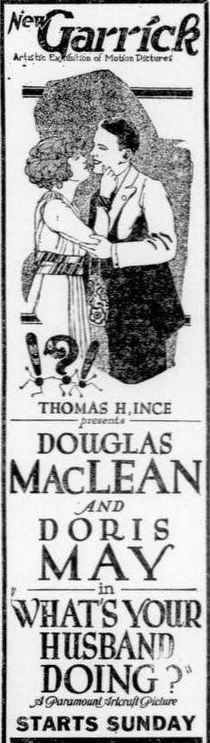
- Newspaper advertisement
- Directed by: Lloyd Ingraham
- Screenplay by: R. Cecil Smith; Ella Stuart Carson
- Based on: What's Your Husband Doing? by George V. Hobart
- Produced by: Thomas H. Ince
- Starring: Douglas MacLean; Doris May; Walter Hiers; William Buckley; Norris Johnson; Alice Claire Elliott
- Cinematography: Charles J. Stumar
- Edited by: Harry L. Decker
- Production companies: Thomas H. Ince Corporation; Artcraft Pictures Corporation; Famous Players–Lasky Corporation
- Distributed by: Paramount Pictures
- Release date: January 25, 1920
- Running time: 50 minutes
- Country: United States
- Language: Silent (English intertitles)

What's Your Husband Doing? is a 1920 American silent comedy film directed by Lloyd Ingraham and written by R. Cecil Smith based upon the play of the same name by George V. Hobart. The film stars Douglas MacLean, Doris May, Walter Hiers, William Buckley, Norris Johnson, and Alice Claire Elliott. The film was released on January 25, 1920, by Paramount Pictures.

== Plot ==
As described in a film magazine, Beatrice Ridley, a young wife who possesses a devoted husband, spends her leisure time dreaming up romances about her Robert in which he figures as a gay Lothario and she the much wronged wife. Her suspicions become aroused when Robert receives letters each morning from the Honeysuckle Inn, a roadhouse frequented by sportsmen. These letters Robert quickly conceals with no word of explanation offered. Beatrice suspects the involvement of another woman and consults with attorneys, Widgast and Pidgeon, with a view of obtaining relief. Both of these lawyers are young men with young wives who also suffer torments of jealousy. Mrs. Widgast and Mrs. Pidgeon are on the scent for any possible infidelities on the part of their husbands. All clues lead to the Honeysuckle Inn and when all the characters meet there, there is a general clearing up of complications and ill-founded suspicions.

== Cast ==
- Douglas MacLean as John P. Widgast
- Doris May as Beatrice Ridley
- Walter Hiers as Charley Pidgeon
- William Buckley as Robert Ridley
- Norris Johnson as Helen Widgast
- Alice Claire Elliott as Gwendolyn Pidgeon
- Alice Wilson as Sylvia Pennywise
- Margaret Livingston as Madge Mitchell
- J. P. Lockney as Tyrus Trotman

== Survival status ==
What's Your Husband Doing? is presumed to be a lost film with only a single incomplete reel surviving at the Library of Congress.
