= Green Eyes (1918 film) =

1918 American silent drama film

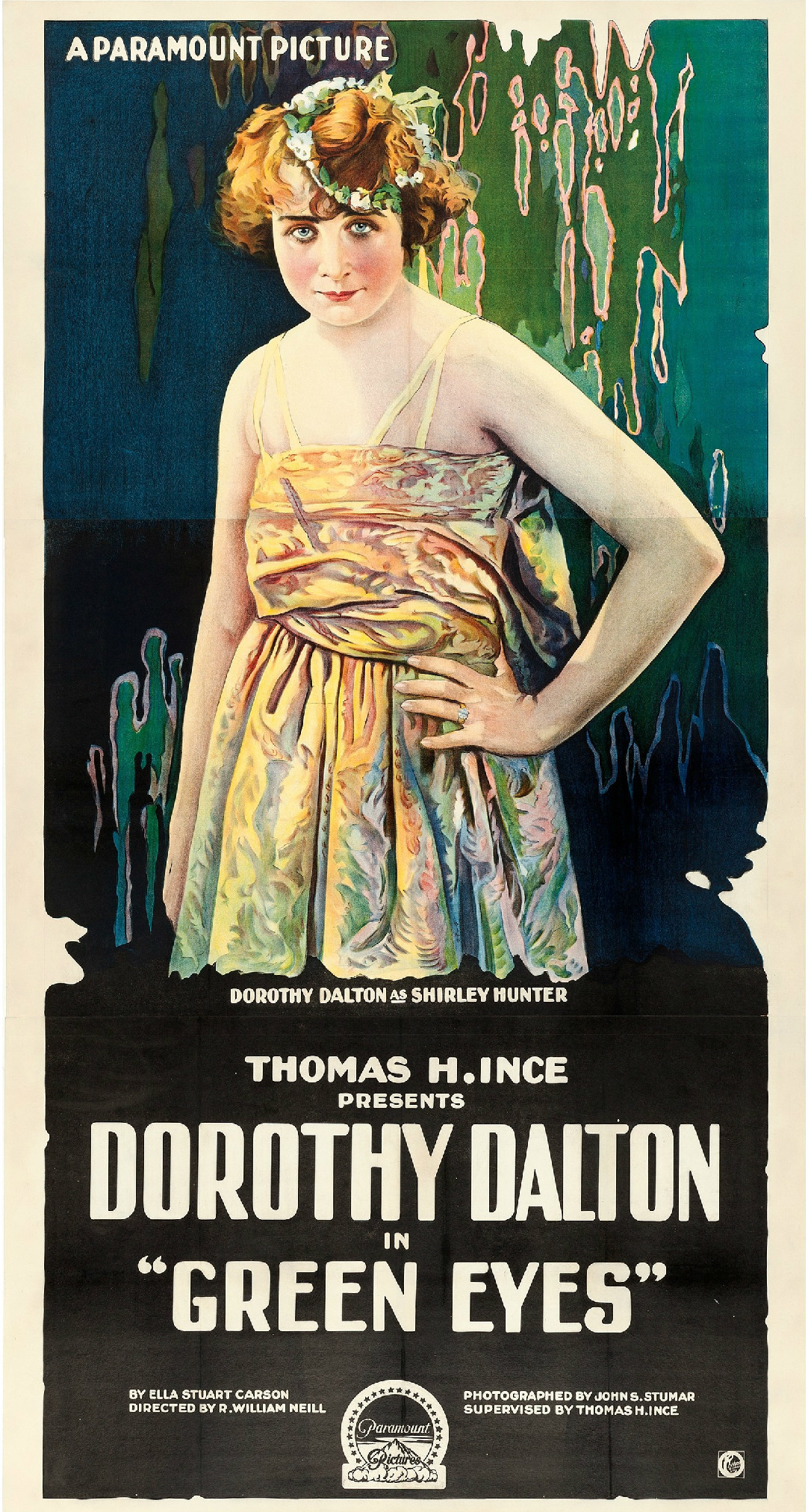
- poster
- Directed by: Roy William Neill
- Screenplay by: Ella Stuart Carson; John Lynch; R. Cecil Smith (scenario)
- Produced by: Thomas H. Ince
- Starring: Dorothy Dalton; Jack Holt; Emory Johnson; Doris May; Robert McKim; Clyde Benson
- Cinematography: John Stumar
- Production company: Thomas H. Ince Corporation
- Distributed by: Paramount Pictures
- Release date: August 11, 1918
- Running time: 50 minutes
- Country: United States
- Language: Silent (English intertitles)

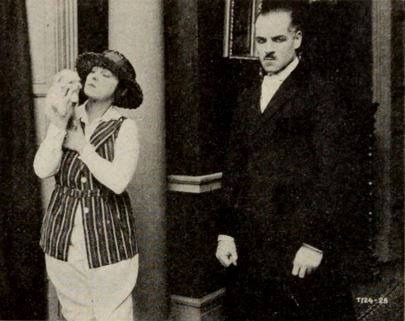
Still with Dalton and Holt.

Green Eyes is a 1918 American silent drama film directed by Roy William Neill and written by Ella Stuart Carson, John Lynch, and R. Cecil Smith. The film stars Dorothy Dalton, Jack Holt, Emory Johnson, Doris May, Robert McKim, and Clyde Benson. The film was released on August 11, 1918, by Paramount Pictures. It is not known whether the film currently survives.

== Plot ==
As described in a film magazine, hardly had Pearson Hunter returned to the south with his young bride Shirley than he flew into a jealous rage because his wife knew one of the men in the welcoming party. Later, when the two lost their way while on a hunting trip, he vented an unreasonable rage upon her.

Margery Gibson, fiancé of his brother Morgan, felt the pangs of the green-eyed monster whenever Morgan showed his sister-in-law the slightest courtesy. She confided her suspicions to Pearson. In the meantime Morgan, resenting a slur upon his brother's wife by Alexander Chapman, fell him with a blow.

A mulatto who hated Chapman was lurking nearby and choked the prostrate man to death. Morgan, thinking he was a murderer, fled in panic and hid in his sister-in-law's room, where he was found by his brother Pearson.

Pearson at once passed judgement and did not want to hear explanations, but later after learning the truth upon hearing the confession of the mulatto, he sought forgiveness and promised to banish jealousy from his life.

== Cast ==
- Dorothy Dalton as Shirley Hunter
- Jack Holt as Pearson Hunter
- Emory Johnson as Morgan Hunter
- Doris May as Margery Gibson
- Robert McKim as Alexander Chapman
- Clyde Benson as Jim Webb
- Charles K. French as Reverend Doctor Gibson

== Reception ==
Like many American films of the time, Green Eyes was subject to restrictions and cuts by city and state film censorship boards. For example, the Chicago Board of Censors removed slurs by required a cut, in Reel 1, of the intertitle "You white nigger, how dare you talk to a gentlemen" and, in Reel 4, the intertitle "I'se the white nigger you kicked in the dirt".
