= Love Me (1918 film) =

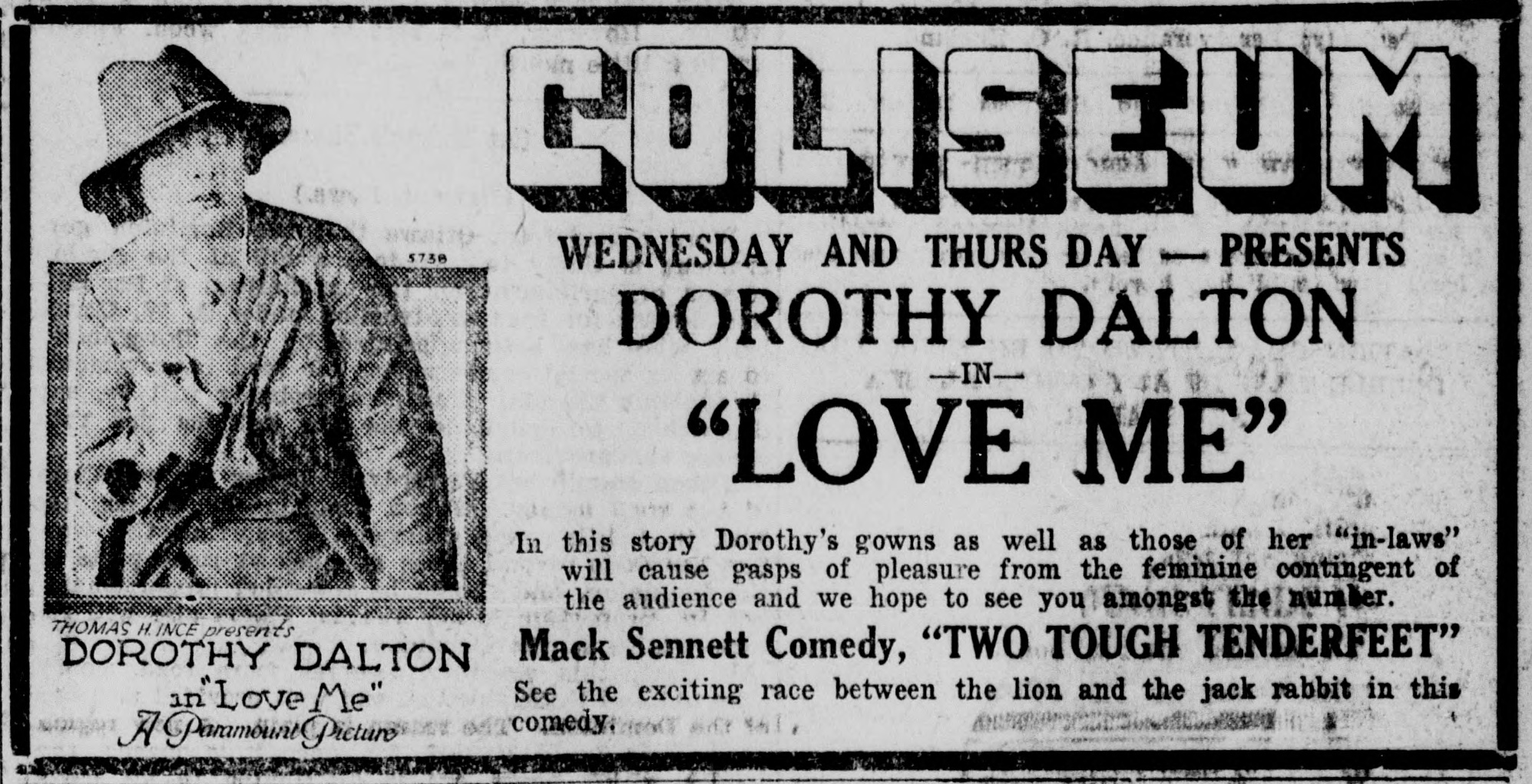
- Contemporary newspaper advertisement
- Directed by: Roy William Neill
- Screenplay by: C. Gardner Sullivan
- Produced by: Thomas H. Ince
- Starring: Dorothy Dalton; Jack Holt; William Conklin; Dorcas Matthews; Melbourne MacDowell; Elinor Hancock
- Cinematography: John Stumar
- Production company: Thomas H. Ince Corporation
- Distributed by: Paramount Pictures
- Release date: March 18, 1918
- Running time: 50 minutes
- Country: United States
- Language: Silent (English intertitles)

Love Me is a surviving 1918 American silent drama film directed by Roy William Neill and written by C. Gardner Sullivan. The film stars Dorothy Dalton, Jack Holt, William Conklin, Dorcas Matthews, Melbourne MacDowell and Elinor Hancock. The film was released on March 18, 1918, by Paramount Pictures.

== Cast ==
- Dorothy Dalton as Maida Madison
- Jack Holt as Gordon Appleby
- William Conklin as Rupert Fenton
- Dorcas Matthews as Eunice
- Melbourne MacDowell as Grant Appleby
- Elinor Hancock as Mrs. Appleby
- Robert McKim as Mortimer Appleby

== Preservation status ==
- Prints survive in the Library of Congress collection and the Academy Film Archive (Beverly Hills).
