= It May Be You =

1915 film

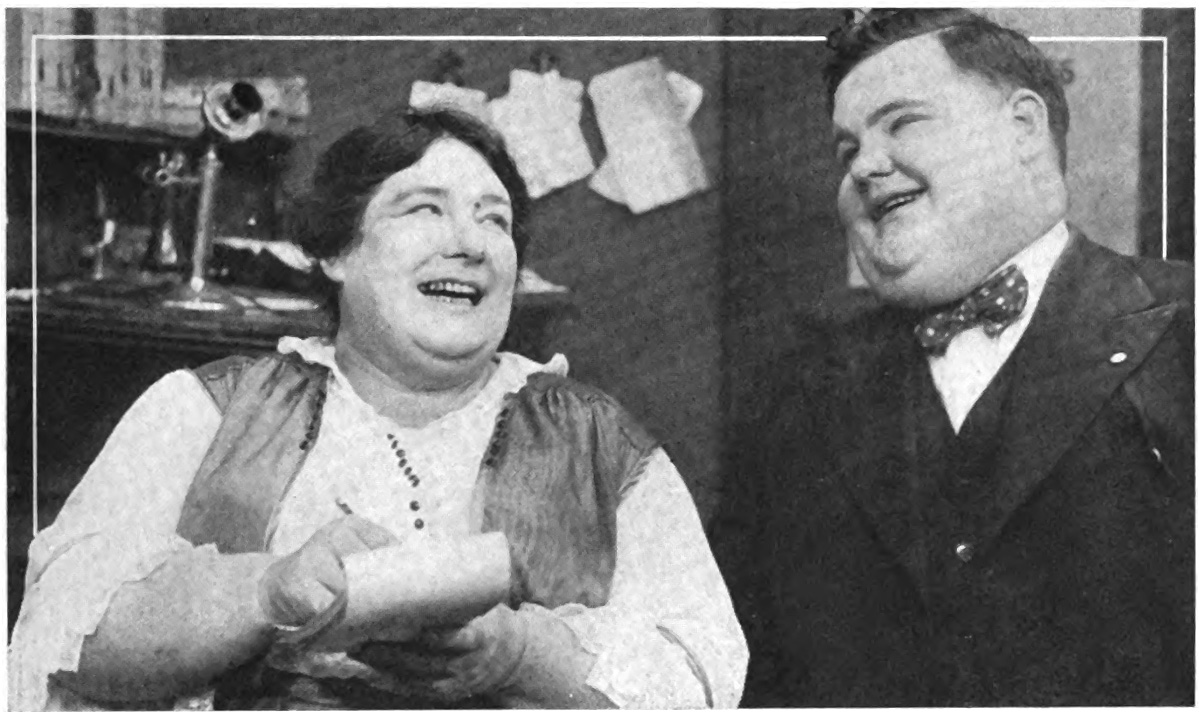
- Promotional still from It May Be You with Oliver Hardy (right)
- Directed by: Will Louis
- Written by: Lawrence Corey
- Starring: Arthur Housman
- Release date: July 7, 1915
- Country: United States
- Languages: Silent film English intertitles

It May Be You is a 1915 American silent comedy film featuring Oliver Hardy.

== Plot ==
This plot summary was published in The Moving Picture World for July 24, 1915

A capital farce motive furnishes "the cue for action" in this one-reel comedy. The construction is apt, the humorous climax being brought about skillfully. Arthur Housman. Dallis Welford, and the other members of the long cast make the performance score heavily.

== Cast ==
- Arthur Housman - Jack Kenwood
- Andy Clark - The Office Boy (as Andrew J. Clark)
- Dallas Welford - Hi Jinks
- Mabel Dwight - Mrs. Jinks
- Maxine Brown - Jinks's Stenographer
- Charles Ascot - William Hall (as Charles Ascott)
- Caroline Rankin - Stenographer
- Oliver Hardy - Paul Simmons (as O.N. Hardy)
- Jessie Stevens - Stenographer
- Harry Eytinge - A Banker
- Gladys Leslie - His secretary
- Julian Reed - James Redfield
- Jean Dumar - Lillian

== See also ==
- List of American films of 1915
- Oliver Hardy filmography
