= Civilian Clothes =

1920 film by Hugh Ford

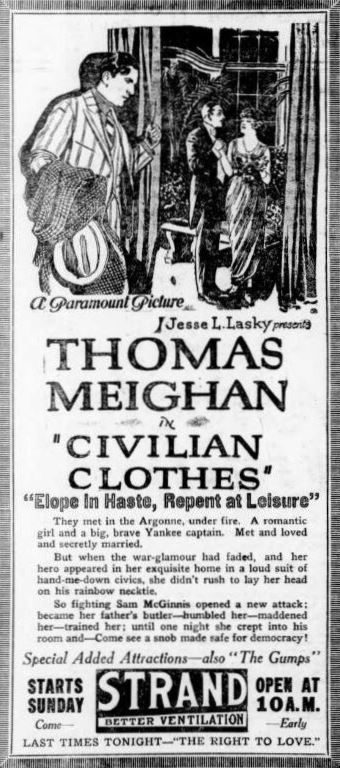
- Newspaper advertisement
- Directed by: Hugh Ford
- Written by: Clara Beranger (scenario)
- Based on: Civilian Clothes by Thompson Buchanan
- Produced by: Adolph Zukor; Jesse L. Lasky
- Starring: Thomas Meighan; Martha Mansfield
- Cinematography: Hal Young
- Distributed by: Paramount Pictures
- Release date: September 5, 1920
- Running time: 60 minutes; 6 reels
- Country: United States
- Language: Silent (English intertitles)

Civilian Clothes is a surviving 1920 American silent comedy film produced by Famous Players–Lasky and distributed by Paramount Pictures. It stars Thomas Meighan and was directed by Hugh Ford. This film is based on the 1919 Broadway play, Civilian Clothes, by Thompson Buchanan. Thurston Hall played Meighan's part in the play.

== Plot ==
As described in a film magazine, Florence Lanham, married in France while a Salvation Army worker to Captain Sam McGinnis, returns to society life in America after receiving word that he was killed in battle. She keeps news of her wedding secret and permits the attentions of Billy Arkwright, an early lover. When McGinnis suddenly appears on the scene, clothed in startlingly bold habiliments, the Lanham stubbornness asserts itself. To impart upon her his own gospel of democracy, McGinnis obtains the place of a discharged butler in the Lanham household. With the help of a former Colonel and a lively young widow, he succeeds in his plan to teach her a lesson about her snobbishness, completely conquering and humbling the young wife, who finds that, after all, the clothes make little difference to the depth of real love.

== Cast ==
- Thomas Meighan as Captain Sam McGinnis
- Martha Mansfield as Florence Lanham
- Maude Turner Gordon as Mrs. Lanham
- Alfred Hickman as William Arkwright
- Frank Losee as Walter Dumont
- Marie Shotwell as Mrs. Smythe
- Warren Cook as Mr. Lanham
- Albert Gran as Dodson
- Isabelle Garrison as Mrs. Arkwright
- Halbert Brown as Major General Girard
- Kathryn Hildreth as Elizabeth Lanham

== Preservation ==
A complete print of Civilian Clothes is held by Gosfilmofond in Moscow.
