= Idolators =

1917 film

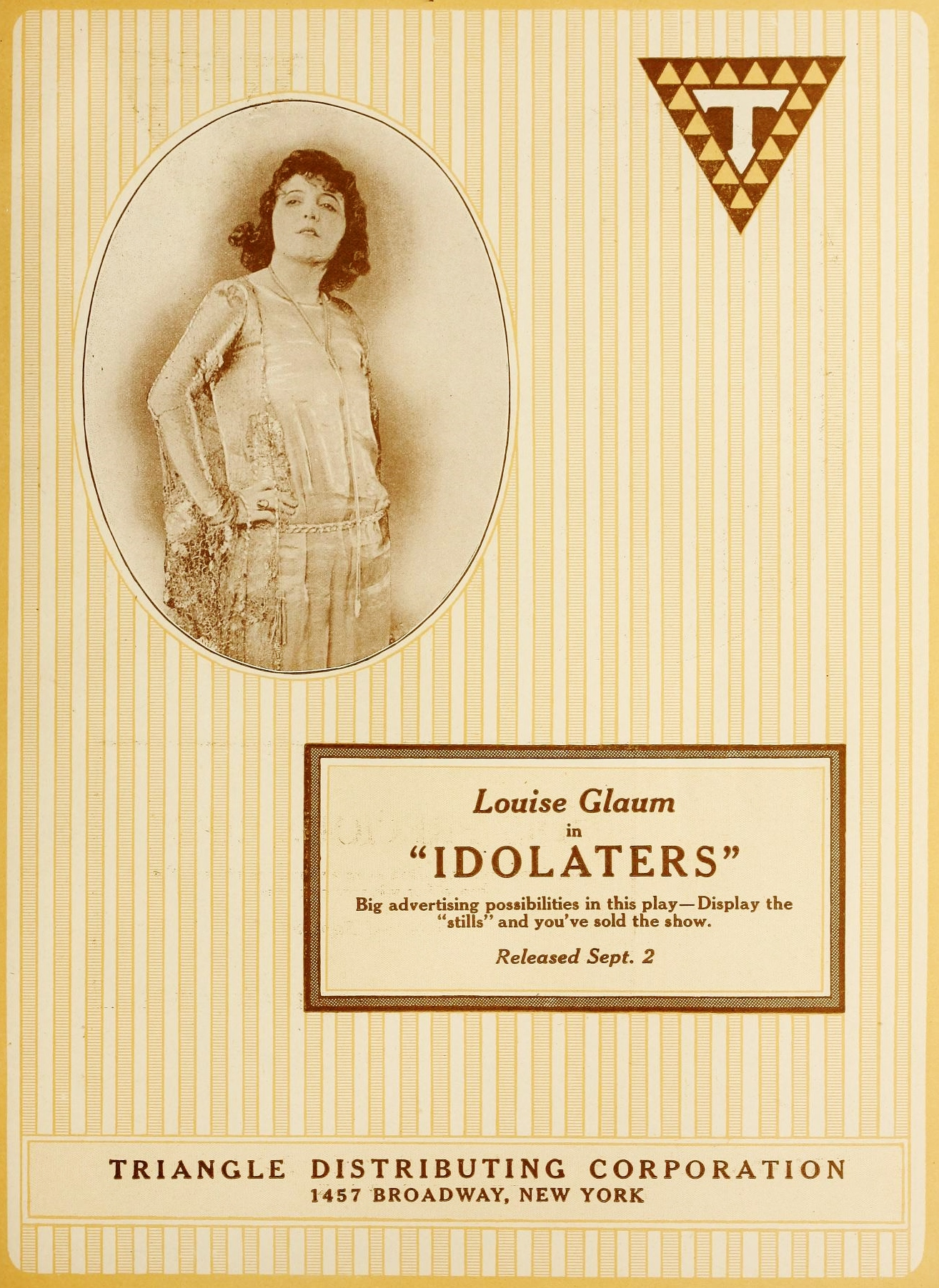
- Directed by: Walter Edwards
- Written by: Monte M. Katterjohn; John Lynch
- Starring: Louise Glaum; George Webb; Dorcas Matthews
- Cinematography: Chester A. Lyons
- Production company: Triangle Film Corporation
- Distributed by: Triangle Distributing
- Release date: September 9, 1917
- Running time: 50 minutes
- Country: United States
- Language: Silent (English intertitles)

Idolators is a 1917 American silent drama film directed by Walter Edwards and starring Louise Glaum, George Webb, and Dorcas Matthews.

== Cast ==
- Louise Glaum as Viola Strathmore
- George Webb as Curtis de Forest Ralston
- Dorcas Matthews as Anita Carew
- Lee Hill as Borul
- Tom Guise as Burr Britton
- Hugo B. Koch as Bruce Winthrope
- Milton Ross as Oscar Brent

== Bibliography ==
- Robert B. Connelly. The Silents: Silent Feature Films, 1910-36, Volume 40, Issue 2. December Press, 1998.
