= Roy William Neill =

Irish-American film director (1887–1946)

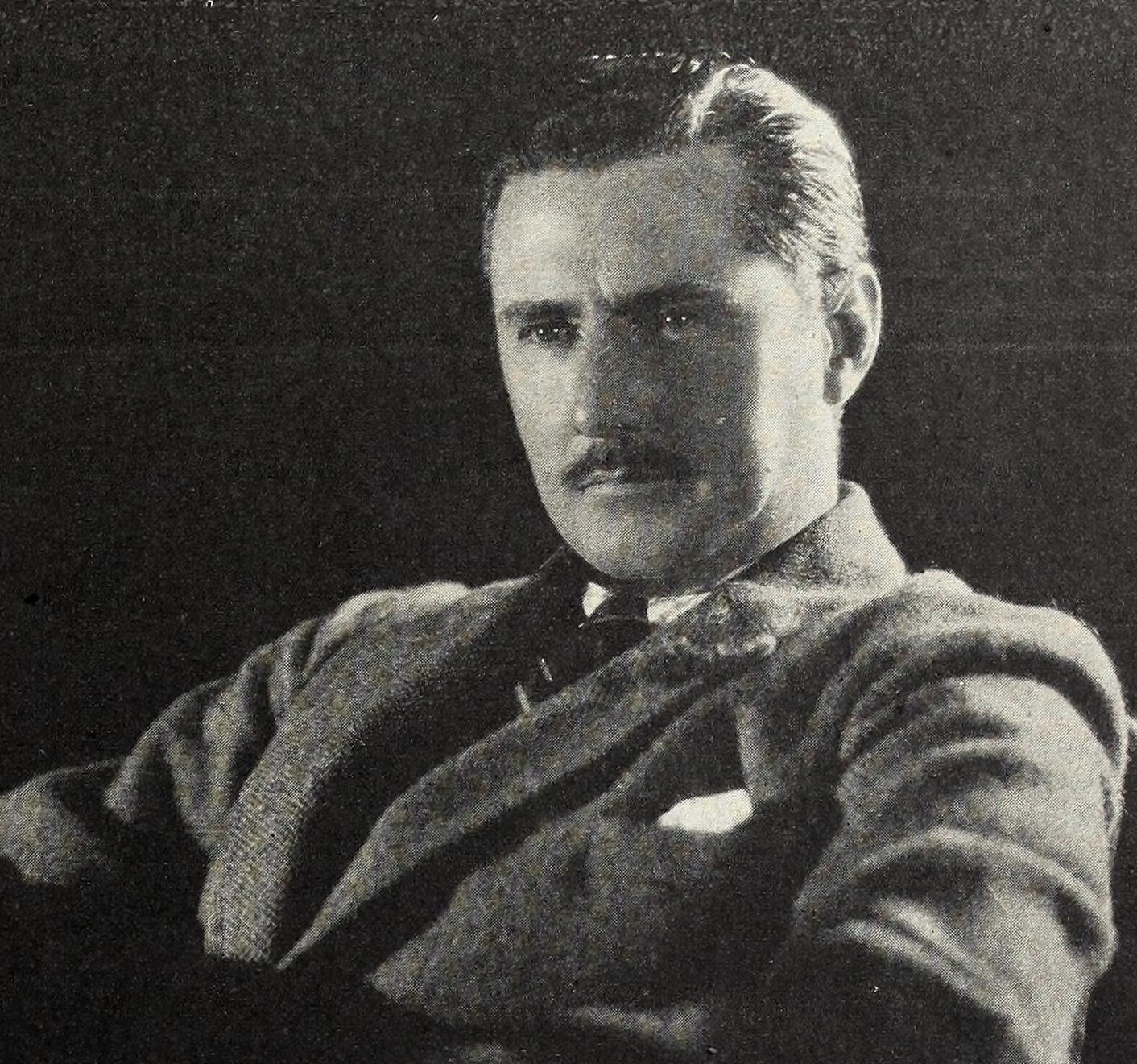
- Roy William Neill c. 1926
- Born: 4 September 1887; Ireland
- Died: 14 December 1946 (aged 59); London, England
- Occupation: Film director
- Years active: 1917–1946

Roy William Neill (born Roland de Gostrie, 4 September 1887 – 14 December 1946) was an Irish-born American film director best known for producing and directing almost all of the Sherlock Holmes films starring Basil Rathbone and Nigel Bruce, made between 1942 and 1946 and released by Universal Pictures. He also directed Frankenstein Meets the Wolf Man (1943), an entry in the popular Universal Monsters franchise.

== Biography ==
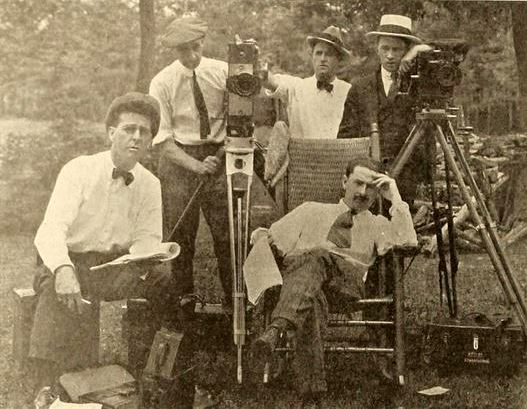
1919 film crew (from left): Thomas Walsh (assistant director), Ned Van Buen (camera operator), Edward James (assistant director), Edward Wynard (camera operator), Neill (director, seated)

With his father as the captain, Roy William Neill was born on a ship off the coast of Ireland. Neill lived in the United States for most of his career and was an American citizen. He began directing silent films in 1917 and went on to helm 111 films, 55 of them silent. He was also credited in some works as R. William Neill, Roy W. Neill, and Roy Neill.

Neill was known for his striking visual style: meticulously lit scenes, careful compositions, and layered shadows that would become the tone of film noir in the late 1940s (his last film, Black Angel (1946), is considered a film noir). Neill's imaginative direction and compositions were noticed by then-low-budget Columbia Pictures, which hired him in 1928.

Roy William Neill became one of Columbia's dependable directors. His best-known Columbia features are Whirlpool, a Jack Holt vehicle that introduced one of Columbia's major stars, Jean Arthur; and The Black Room (1935), a costume thriller starring Boris Karloff in a dual role. Neill also directed additional scenes, without screen credit, for Frank Capra's 1932 feature American Madness.

In 1935 Neill left Columbia for a five-year stay in London, where better opportunities existed for American directors. British film producer Edward Black hired Neill to direct The Lady Vanishes. However, due to delays in production, Black engaged Alfred Hitchcock to direct instead.

In 1942 Neill became a producer-director for Universal Pictures. After the studio's first Sherlock Holmes mystery, produced by Howard Benedict and directed by John Rawlins, the studio assigned Roy William Neill to take over the series as both producer and director. Most of Neill's Universal films are atmospheric thrillers, although he did direct one musical, Rhythm of the Islands (1943). His best-known Universal feature, apart from the Sherlock Holmes pictures, is Frankenstein Meets the Wolf Man (1943).

In 1942, when Universal's major production Flesh and Fantasy was recut after its preview from four sequences to three, the deleted sequence starring Gloria Jean, Alan Curtis, and Frank Craven was shelved. In August 1944, the studio assigned Roy William Neill to expand the half-hour sequence into a full-length feature called The Fugitive. Neill produced the new material but did not direct; the project was rushed through production in less than two weeks while Gloria Jean was available, so Neill had no time to prepare any original direction. The feature version was ultimately released in December 1944 as Destiny.

After Destiny, Neill supervised the Sherlock Holmes series almost exclusively; he remained with Universal through 1946. He died in London, England, from a heart attack.

Director Joe Dante cited Neill as one of his favorites as a director.

== Filmography ==
- The Girl, Glory (1917)
- The Mother Instinct (1917)
- They're Off (1917)
- The Price Mark (1917)
- Love Letters (1917)
- Flare-Up Sal (1918)
- Love Me (1918)
- Free and Equal (1918)
- Tyrant Fear (1918)
- The Mating of Marcella (1918)
- The Kaiser's Shadow (1918)
- Green Eyes (1918)
- Vive la France! (1918)
- Puppy Love (1919)
- Charge It to Me (1919)
- Trixie from Broadway (1919)
- The Career of Katherine Bush (1919)
- The Bandbox (1919)
- The Woman Gives (1920)
- The Inner Voice (1920)
- Yes or No? (1920)
- Good References (1920)
- Dangerous Business (1920)
- Something Different (1920)
- The Idol of the North (1921)
- The Conquest of Canaan (1921)
- The Iron Trail (1921)
- What's Wrong with the Women? (1922)
- The Man From M.A.R.S. (1922)
- Toilers of the Sea (1923)
- By Divine Right (1924)
- Vanity's Price (1924)
- Broken Laws (1924)
- Percy (1925)
- Marriage in Transit (1925)
- The Kiss Barrier (1925)
- Greater Than a Crown (1925)
- The Cowboy and the Countess (1926)
- The Fighting Buckaroo (1926)
- A Man Four-Square (1926)
- Black Paradise (1926)
- The City (1926)
- Marriage (1927)
- The Arizona Wildcat (1927)
- The Lady of Victories (1928) - short
- The Czarina's Secret (1928) - short
- San Francisco Nights (1928)
- The Virgin Queen (1928) - short
- The Olympic Hero (1928)
- Lady Raffles (1928)
- Cleopatra (1928) - short
- The Heart of General Robert E. Lee (1928) - short
- The Viking (1928)
- Madame DuBarry (1928) - short
- Behind Closed Doors (1929)
- Wall Street (1929)
- The Melody Man (1930)
- Cock 'o the Walk (1930) - lost film
- Just Like Heaven (1930)
- Fifty Fathoms Deep (1931)
- The Avenger (1931)
- The Good Bad Girl (1931)
- Fifty Fathoms Deep (1931)
- The Menace (1932)
- American Madness (1932) - uncredited
- That's My Boy (1932)
- The Circus Queen Murder (1933)
- As the Devil Commands (1933)
- Fury of the Jungle (1933)
- Above the Clouds (1933)
- The Ninth Guest (1934)
- Whirlpool (1934)
- Black Moon (1934)
- Blind Date (1934)
- I'll Fix It (1934)
- Jealousy (1934)
- Mills of the Gods (1934)
- Eight Bells (1935)
- The Black Room (1935)
- The Lone Wolf Returns (1935)
- Gypsy (1937)
- Doctor Syn (1937)
- Quiet Please (1938)
- The Viper (1938)
- Simply Terrific (1938)
- Double or Quits (1938)
- Thank Evans (1938) British
- Many Tanks Mr. Atkins (1938)
- Everything Happens to Me (1938)
- A Gentleman's Gentleman (1939)
- Murder Will Out (1939)
- His Brother's Keeper (1940)
- Hoots Mon! (1940)
- The Good Old Days (1939)
- Eyes of the Underworld (1942)
- Madame Spy (1942)
- Sherlock Holmes and the Secret Weapon (1942)
- Sherlock Holmes in Washington (1943)
- Frankenstein Meets the Wolf Man (1943)
- Rhythm of the Islands (1943)
- Sherlock Holmes Faces Death (1943)
- The Spider Woman (1943)
- The Scarlet Claw (1944)
- The Pearl of Death (1944)
- Gypsy Wildcat (1944)
- The House of Fear (1945)
- The Woman in Green (1945)
- Pursuit to Algiers (1945)
- Terror by Night (1946)
- Dressed to Kill (1946)
- Black Angel (1946)
