= Dorcas Matthews =

American actress (1890–1969)

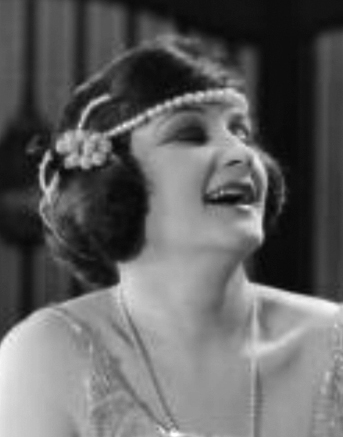
- Matthews in The Woman in the Suitcase (1920)
- Born: Dorcas Neville Matthews; 5 November 1890; Lancashire, England
- Died: 24 January 1969 (aged 78); Berkeley, California, U.S.
- Occupation: Actress
- Years active: 1916–1956
- Spouse: Robert McKim (m. 1920; died 1927)
- Children: 2

Dorcas Neville Matthews (5 November 1890 – 24 January 1969) was an English actress in silent films in the U.S. She had numerous roles as a supporting actress and was well known.

== Biography ==
Dorcas Neville Matthews was born in Lancashire, England, in 1890. She came to North America as part of the Jeanne Russell Theatrical Company, along with actor William Henry Pratt who became known as Boris Karloff. 1911 census records show that Matthews resided in a lodging house in Vancouver, British Columbia, Canada.

She married fellow actor Robert McKim in Hawaii on 25 April 1920, and had two children with him. According to Fandango, she retired to take care of them. She appeared in a small number of films in uncredited roles in later decades. New York Motion Picture Corporation sued Thomas H. Ince and among the allegations was poaching actors including Matthews.

She was widowed when McKim died in 1927 and apparently never remarried.

== Selected filmography ==
- The Captive God (1916), along with her husband, Robert McKim
- The Jungle Child (1916)
- Honor Thy Name (1916)
- Puppets (1917)
- A Strange Transgressor (1917)
- Borrowed Plumage (1917)
- Idolators (1917)
- Love or Justice (1917)
- The Little Brother (1917)
- Ten of Diamonds (1917)
- Madcap Madge (1917)
- The Silent Man (1917)
- Love Letters (1917)
- The Price Mark (1917)
- The Tar Heel Warrior (1917)
- The Millionaire Vagrant (1917)
- Love Me (1918)
- The Claws of the Hun (1918)
- A Nine O'Clock Town (1918)
- The Virtuous Thief (1919)
- The Market of Souls (1919)
- The Law of Men (1919)
- The Haunted Bedroom (1919)
- Beckoning Roads (1919)
- The Luck of Geraldine Laird (1920)
- The Woman in the Suitcase (1920)
- Blood and Sand (1922)
- Vanity Fair (1932)
- The Famous Mrs. Fair (1923)
- A Lady Takes a Chance (1943)
