= The Fool's Revenge =

1916 film by Will S. Davis

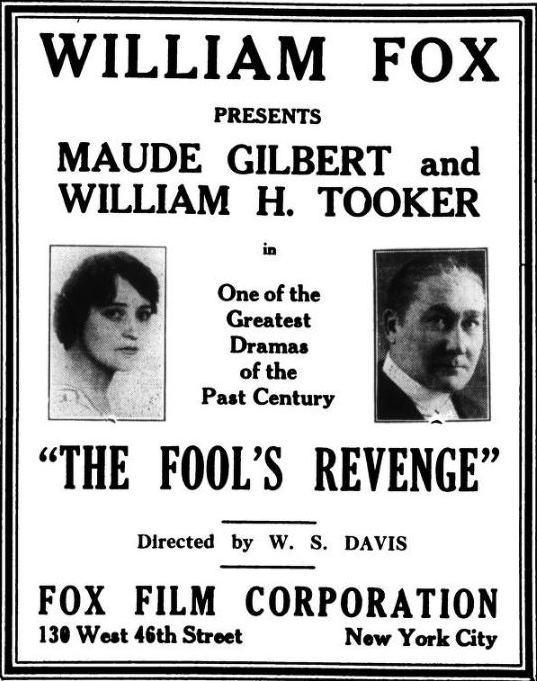
- Directed by: Will S. Davis
- Written by: Tom Taylor (play); Will S. Davis
- Produced by: William Fox
- Starring: William H. Tooker; Richard Neill; Ruth Findlay
- Production company: Fox Film
- Distributed by: Fox Film
- Release date: February 13, 1916
- Running time: 6 reels
- Country: United States
- Languages: Silent; English intertitles

The Fool's Revenge is a lost 1916 American silent drama film directed by Will S. Davis and starring William H. Tooker, Richard Neill and Ruth Findlay.

== Cast ==
- William H. Tooker as Anson
- Maude Gilbert as Anson's Wife
- Ruth Findlay as Ethel - Anson's Daughter
- Richard Neill as Randall
- Warner Oland
- Kittens Reichert as Ethel - as a Child

== Bibliography ==
- Solomon, Aubrey. The Fox Film Corporation, 1915-1935: A History and Filmography. McFarland, 2011.
