= Martha Mansfield =

American actress (1899–1923)

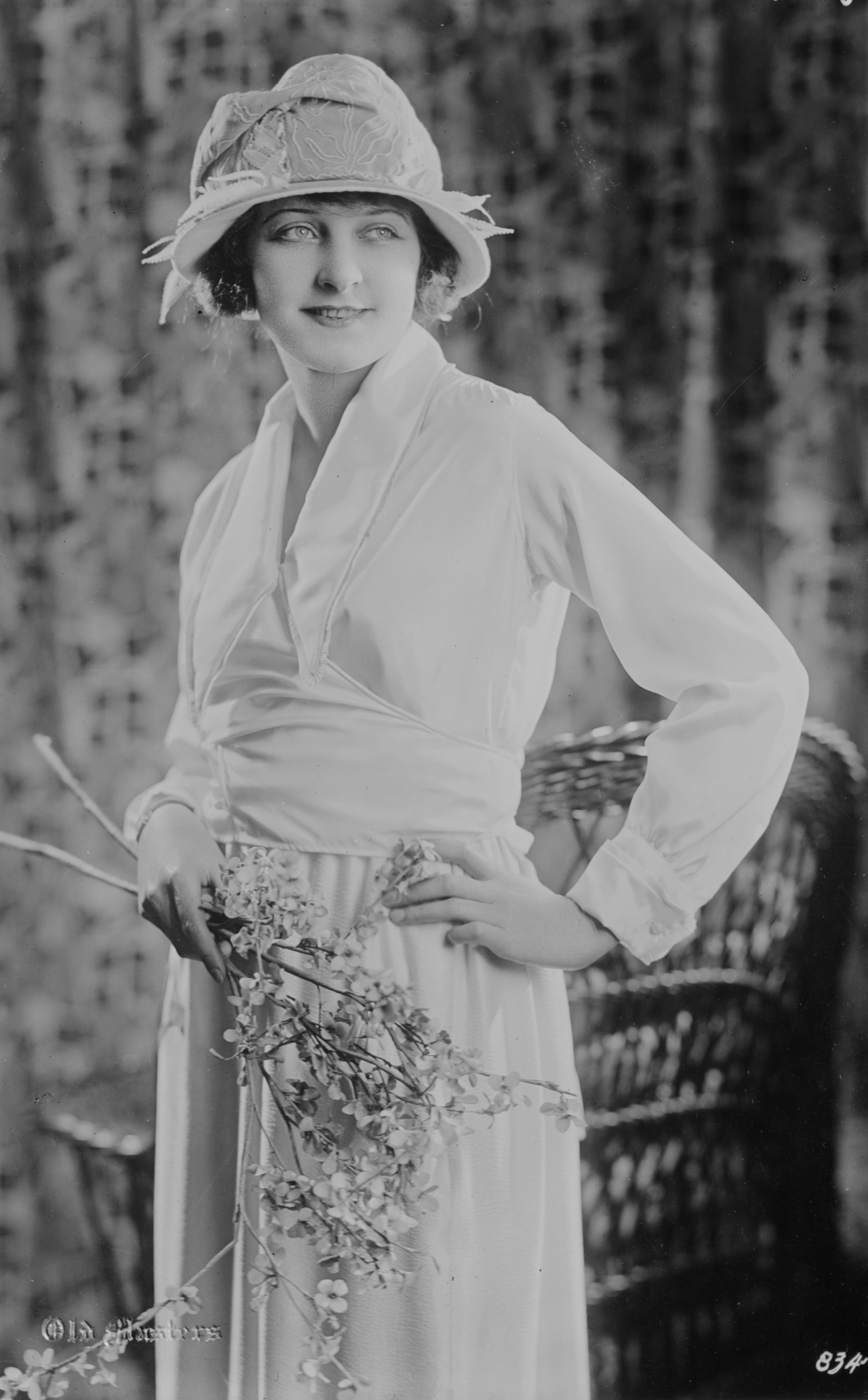
- Mansfield in 1922
- Born: Martha Ehrlich; July 14, 1899; New York City, U.S.
- Died: November 30, 1923 (aged 24); San Antonio, Texas, U.S.
- Resting place: Woodlawn Cemetery
- Other name: Martha Early
- Occupation: Actress
- Years active: 1912–1923

Martha Mansfield (born Martha Ehrlich; July 14, 1899 – November 30, 1923) was an American actress in silent films and vaudeville stage plays.

== Early life ==
She was born in New York City to Maurice and Harriett Gibson Ehrlich. She had a younger sister, Edith, born in 1905. Although many biographies state that Martha was born in Mansfield, Ohio, her birth record and death certificate both have New York City as her place of birth. Her mother, Harriet, was from Mansfield, Ohio, having emigrated there from Ireland in 1885. Martha later adopted the name of the town as her stage name. By the early 1910s, Mansfield and her mother had moved to the Bronx and were living on 158th Street.

== Career ==
At the age of 14, she became determined to become an actress. She lobbied for, and won, a role in the Broadway production of Little Women in 1912. She also began working as an artists' model and dancer. She danced in the musical Hop o' My Thumb in 1913, still using her birth name. She also acted in The Passing Show of 1915 and Robinson Crusoe, Jr. before changing her name. As a model, she posed for illustrator Harrison Fisher and was the subject of more than 300 photographs by Alfred Cheney Johnston.

Using the name Martha Early, she was signed to a six-month contract with Essanay Studios in 1917 where she appeared in three films with French actor Max Linder. In 1918, she appeared in the Ziegfeld Follies. Later that same year, she made her feature film debut in Broadway Bill, opposite Harold Lockwood. In early 1919, Mansfield announced that she had decided to pursue a film career full-time. Before she relocated to the west coast, Mansfield played leads in films produced by Famous Players–Lasky. In October 1919, she appeared in Florenz Ziegfeld's The Midnight Frolic.

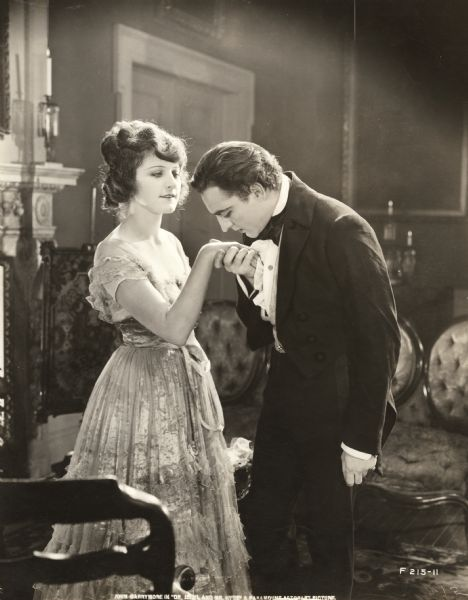
Martha Mansfield and John Barrymore in a scene still from Dr. Jekyll and Mr. Hyde, 1920.

Her first Hollywood movie was Civilian Clothes (1920) directed by Hugh Ford. She gained prominence as Millicent Carew (originally offered to Tallulah Bankhead) in the film adaptation of Dr. Jekyll and Mr. Hyde, which starred John Barrymore. She then signed with Selznick Pictures where she was cast with Eugene O'Brien in The Perfect Lover (1919). In 1921, Mansfield returned to the stage in a vaudeville tour. She appeared in two independent films the following year: Queen of the Moulin Rouge and Till We Meet Again. She spent the remainder of the year touring the vaudeville circuit.

In 1923, Mansfield completed her contract for Selznick and signed with Fox Film Corporation. Her first film for Fox was The Silent Command, starring Edmund Lowe and Béla Lugosi. The final completed features in her short film career were Potash and Perlmutter and The Leavenworth Case, both from 1923.

== Death ==
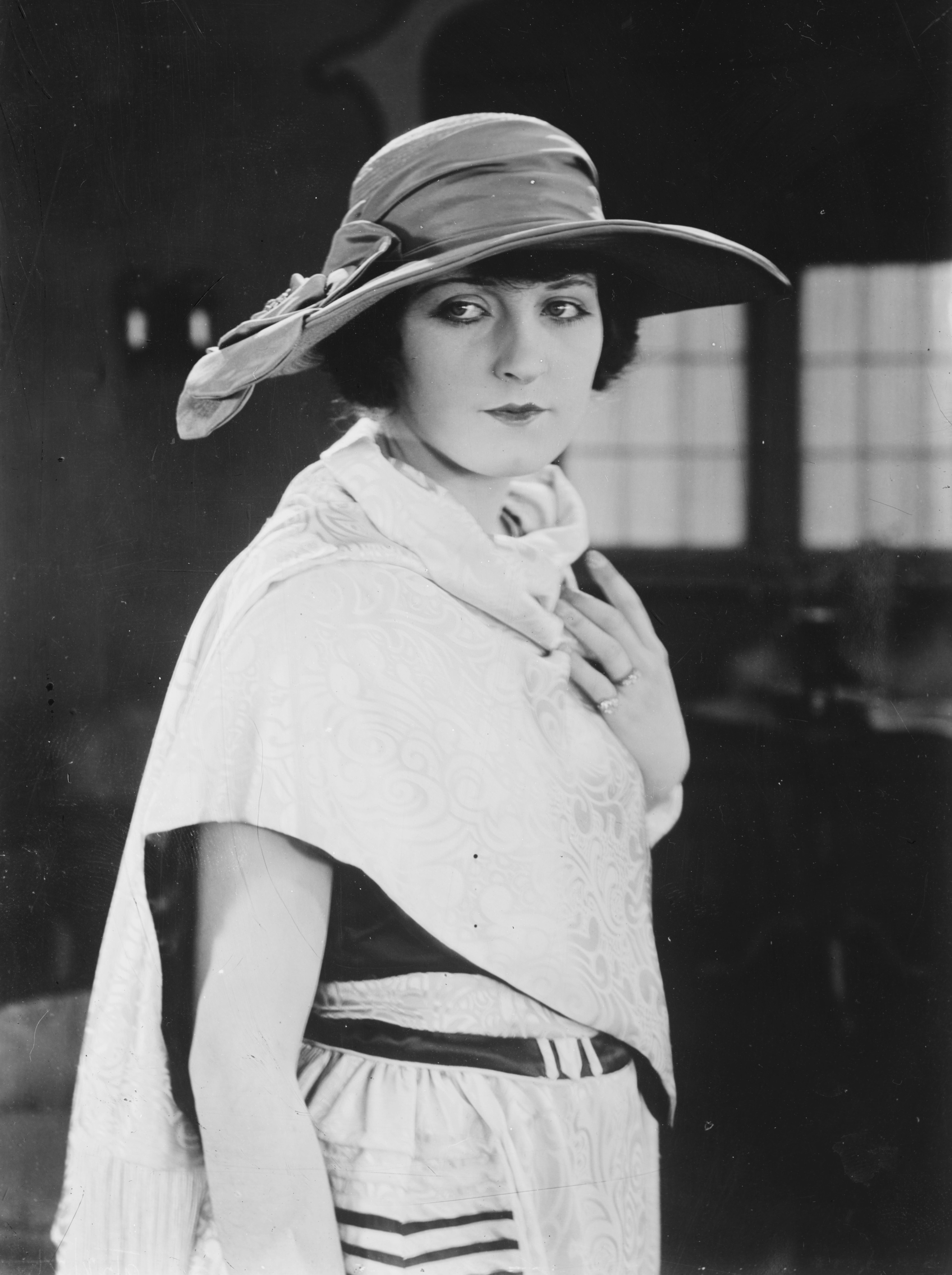
Mansfield in an undated photo

On November 29, 1923, while working on location in San Antonio, Texas on the film The Warrens of Virginia, Mansfield was severely burned when a tossed match ignited her Civil War costume of hoop skirts and flimsy ruffles. Mansfield was playing the role of Agatha Warren and had just finished her scenes and retired to a car when her clothing burst into flames. Her neck and face were saved when leading man Wilfred Lytell threw his heavy overcoat over her. The chauffeur of Mansfield's car was burned badly on his hands while trying to remove the burning clothing from the actress. The fire was put out, but she sustained substantial burns to her body.

She was rushed to a hospital where she died the following day of "burns of all extremities, general toxemia and suppression of urine". Mansfield was 24 years old. Accompanied by actor Phillip Shorey, Mansfield's body was transported back to her home in New York City. She was interred at the Woodlawn Cemetery in The Bronx. It was never determined who threw the match that ignited Mansfield's clothing. Some witnesses said they saw a match enter through the window of the car Mansfield was sitting in. Another theory was that a nervous Mansfield decided to smoke a cigarette in the car to calm her nerves and accidentally ignited the dress with a dropped match or a cigarette. Mansfield's mother, Harriett Ehrlich, dismissed this theory as she said smoking made her daughter "uncomfortable".

== Aftermath ==
When The Warrens of Virginia was finally released in late 1924, Mansfield's role had been edited down, and Rosemary Hill was promoted as the female lead.

While Mansfield left an estate valued only at US$2,473 (equivalent to $46,731 in 2025), some years before she had bequeathed $22,000 (equivalent to $415,723 in 2025) in Liberty bonds to her mother. She also left her mother two life insurance policies, each worth $25,000 (equivalent to $472,412 in 2025).

== Filmography ==
Year	Title	Role	Notes
1917	Max Comes Across		Short film
1917	Max Wants a Divorce	Max's Wife	Short film
1917	Max in a Taxi		Short film
1918	Broadway Bill	Muriel Latham	Lost film
1918	The Spoiled Girl		Short film
1919	The Hand Invisible	Katherine Dale	
1919	The Perfect Lover	Mavis Morgan	Lost film
1919	Should a Husband Forgive?		Lost film
1920	A Social Sleuth		Short film
1920	Women Men Love	Ruth Gibson	
1920	Mothers of Men	Paulette	
1920	Dr. Jekyll and Mr. Hyde	Millicent Carew	
1920	Civilian Clothes	Florence Lanham	
1920	The Wonderful Chance	Peggy Winton	
1921	His Brother's Keeper	Helen Harding	Lost film
1921	Gilded Lies	Hester Thorpe	Lost film
1921	The Last Door	Helen Rogers	Lost film
1921	A Man of Stone	Lady Fortescue	
1922	Queen of the Moulin Rouge	Rosalie Anjou	
1922	Till We Meet Again	Henrietta Carter	Lost film
1923	Is Money Everything?	Mrs. Justine Pelham	
1923	The Woman in Chains	Claudia Marvelle	
1923	Youthful Cheaters	Lois Brooke	Lost film
1923	The Little Red Schoolhouse	Mercy Brent	Lost film
1923	Fog Bound	Mildred Van Buren	Lost film
1923	The Silent Command	Peg Williams, the vamp	
1923	Potash and Perlmutter	The Head Model	Lost film
1923	The Leavenworth Case	Mary Leavenworth	Lost film
1924	The Warrens of Virginia	Agatha Warren	Released posthumously Lost film
