= The Law of Men =

The Law of Men may refer to:

- The Law of Men (1919 film)
- The Law of Men (1962 film)
