= R. Cecil Smith =

American screenwriter (1880–1922)

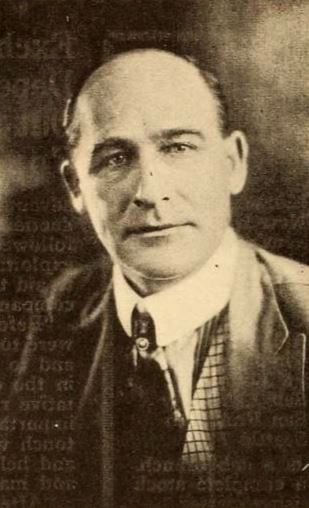
- Born: Reginald Cecil Smith; September 27, 1880; Parkersburg, West Virginia, US
- Died: December 18, 1922 (aged 42); Santa Monica, California, US
- Education: University of Chicago
- Occupation: Screenwriter
- Spouse: Ella Stuart Carson

Reginald Cecil Smith (September 27, 1880 – December 18, 1922) was an American screenwriter and actor active during Hollywood's silent era. He collaborated frequently with his screenwriter wife Ella Stuart Carson, often writing under the name the R. Cecil Smiths. He sold cars before he decided to turn his talents to writing.

== Selected filmography ==
- Footlights and Shadows (1920)
- The Valley of Doubt (1920)
- The Shadow of Rosalie Byrnes (1920)
- The Figurehead (1920)
- The Bootlegger's Daughter (1922)
- Gilded Lies (1921)
- The Fighter (1921)
- Worlds Apart (1921)
- Broadway and Home (1920)
- The Daughter Pays (1920)
- His Wife's Money (1920)
- Sooner or Later (1920)
- What's Your Husband Doing? (1920)
- The Country Cousin (1919)
- The Law of the North (1918)
- Green Eyes (1918)
- The Claws of the Hun (1918)
- Flying Colors (1917)
- Madcap Madge (1917)
