= The Thoroughbred (1928 film) =

1928 film

- Directed by: Sidney Morgan
- Written by: Sidney Morgan
- Produced by: Sidney Morgan
- Starring: Ian Hunter; Louise Prussing; Richard Barclay; Harry Agar Lyons
- Production company: London Screenplays
- Distributed by: Gaumont British Distributors
- Release date: December 1928
- Running time: 5,608 feet
- Country: United Kingdom
- Languages: Silent; English intertitles

The Thoroughbred is a 1928 British silent drama film directed by Sidney Morgan and starring Ian Hunter, Louise Prussing and Richard Barclay. It was made at Twickenham Studios. The screenplay concerns a jockey who is pressured to throw The Derby.

== Premise ==
The wife of a Member of Parliament pressures a jockey to throw The Derby.

== Cast ==
- Ian Hunter
- Louise Prussing
- Richard Barclay
- Harry Agar Lyons

== See also ==
- List of films about horses
- List of films about horse racing

== Bibliography ==
- Low, Rachel. The History of British Film: Volume IV, 1918–1929. Routledge, 1997.
- Wood, Linda. British Films, 1927-1939. British Film Institute, 1986.
