= Love Letters (1917 film) =

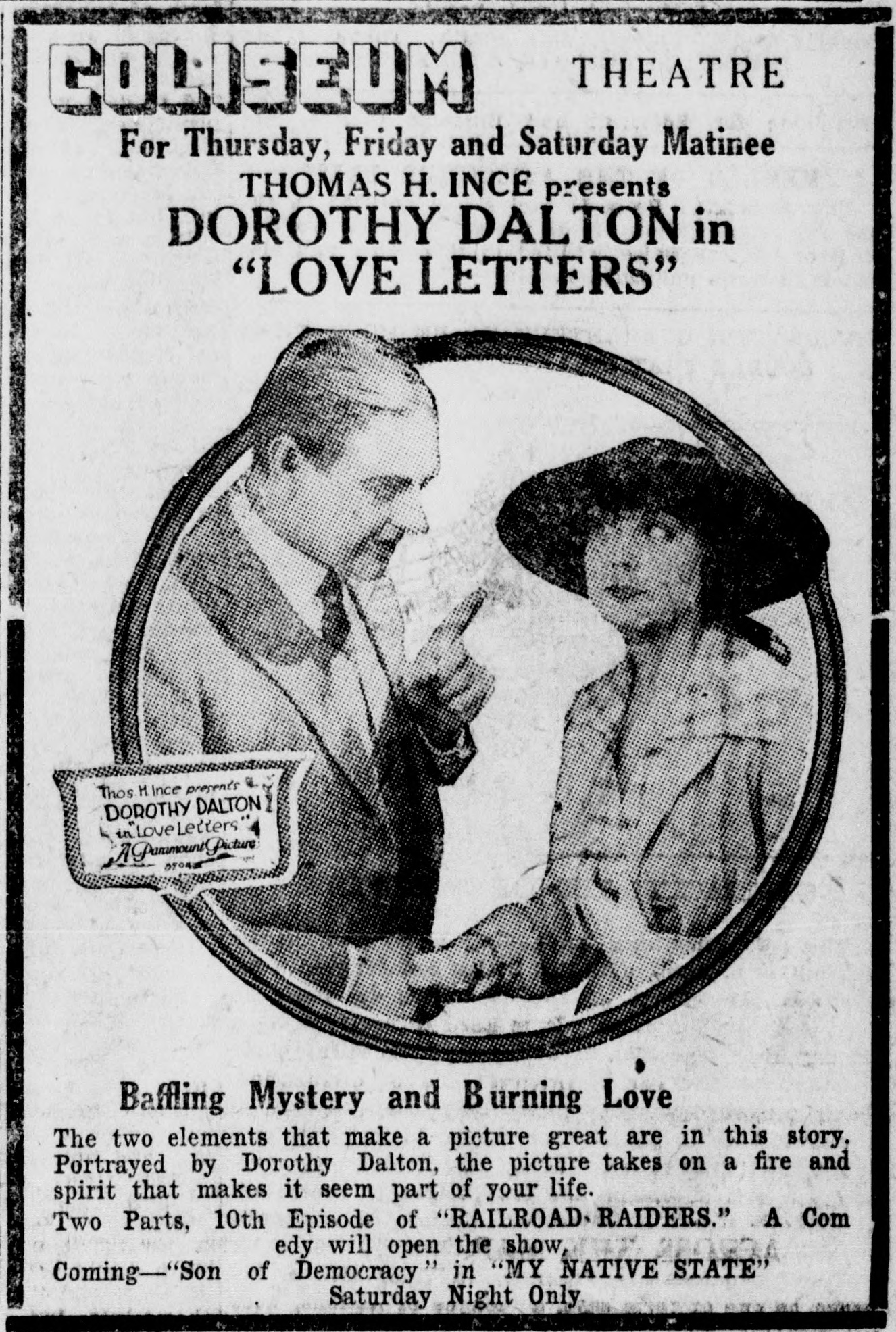
- Contemporary advertisement
- Directed by: Roy William Neill
- Screenplay by: Ella Stuart Carson; Shannon Fife
- Produced by: Thomas H. Ince
- Starring: Dorothy Dalton; William Conklin; Dorcas Matthews; Thurston Hall; Hayward Mack; William Hoffman
- Cinematography: John Stumar
- Production company: Thomas H. Ince Corporation
- Distributed by: Paramount Pictures
- Release date: December 24, 1917
- Running time: 50 minutes
- Country: United States
- Language: Silent (English intertitles)

Love Letters is a 1917 American silent drama film directed by Roy William Neill and written by Ella Stuart Carson and Shannon Fife. The film stars Dorothy Dalton, William Conklin, Dorcas Matthews, Thurston Hall, Hayward Mack, and William Hoffman. The film was released on December 24, 1917, by Paramount Pictures. A print of Love Letters is held by the Library of Congress.

== Plot ==
As described in a film magazine, Eileen Rodney is in love with Raymoond Moreland, a lecturer who favors the mating of souls without the usual ceremony. When she learns his true convictions she is disgusted and accepts the proposal of her guardian, John Harland. After she is married, Eileen meets Moreland and requests the return of her love letters, and he invites her to his home. When she gets there he forces his attentions on her. In self-defense she strikes him and, believing him dead, rushes from the home. The guilt of her action weighs on her life. Later, a half crazed gardener confesses to the crime and, with the knowledge that she is blameless, Eileen confesses everything to her husband.

== Cast ==
- Dorothy Dalton as Eileen Rodney
- William Conklin as Raymoond Moreland
- Dorcas Matthews as Eleanor Dare
- Thurston Hall as John Harland
- Hayward Mack as Robert Maxwell
- William Hoffman as Amos

== Reception ==
Like many American films of the time, Love Letters was subject to cuts by city and state film censorship boards. The Chicago Board of Censors required a cut in Reel 2 of the two intertitles "Remember he's mine and will always be mine" and "You aren't through with me yet", in Reel 4, two struggle scenes between man and young woman, in Reel 5, three intertitles "God be praised for letting me kill him — he wronged my little girl", "Don't for God's sake, don't, I intended to marry your daughter if she had waited", and "Had you nothing but letters to conceal —", and the vision scene of killing the man.
