= Arthur Housman =

American actor (1889–1942)

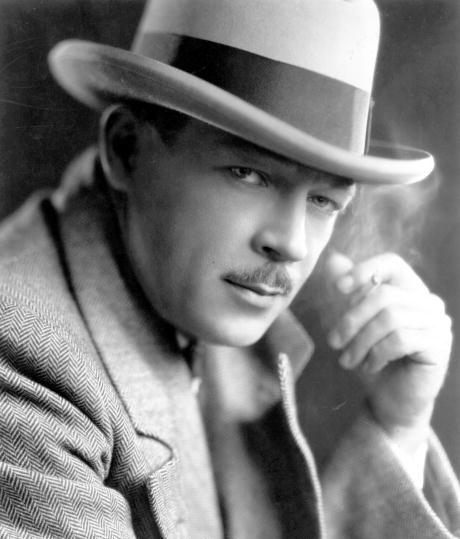
- Housman in 1925
- Born: October 10, 1889; New York City, New York, U.S.
- Died: April 8, 1942 (aged 52); Los Angeles, California, U.S.
- Years active: 1912–1941
- Spouse(s): Florence Nightingale Housman (née Banta, formerly Morse)

Arthur Housman (October 10, 1889 – April 8, 1942) was an American actor in films during both the silent film era and the Golden Age of Hollywood.

== Career ==
Arthur Housman was one of the first screen comedians known to the public by name, and one of the first to be part of a movie comedy team. He was a slapstick comic and light leading man for the pioneer Edison studio in New York. In 1913–14, the Edison company cast Housman opposite character actor William Wadsworth as the comedy team "Waddy and Arty."

As a member of Edison's stock company, Housman participated in Edison's experimental production of talking pictures. Edison had engineered a way to synchronize dialogue and music (via phonograph records) with the visual action on film, and produced such novelties as Musical Blacksmiths (a male chorus) and Nursery Favorites. Housman appeared in several reels, including The Edison Minstrels (as the interlocutor making the spoken announcements) and Jack's Joke.

The Edison Kinetophone system, while practical mechanically, was not successful in theaters because the volume could not be amplified sufficiently for large audiences. In 2018, the antique recordings were digitally remastered and synchronized, resulting in a DVD release of the Edison talkies, The Kinetophone! A Fact! A Reality!

In 1917, Housman was working at the Mayfair Film Corporation. During World War One, he served briefly in the Naval Reserve Force as a Fireman, 3rd class. Housman resumed his screen career after the war; in 1925 he was starring in Fox comedy shorts.

Initially a leading man, Housman later became known as Hollywood's most familiar comic drunkard in films of the 1930s, usually playing cameo parts in features but with better opportunities in short films. He adopted a dapper moustache for his screen appearances. His best remembered roles were in several Laurel and Hardy films, notably Scram!, Our Relations, and (in the title role) The Live Ghost. He appeared almost exclusively as drunks (in such high-profile feature films as Movie Crazy and After the Thin Man) but occasionally did play straight, sober character parts (he's the frustrated timekeeper in the Three Stooges short Punch Drunks).

Housman was plagued with alcohol problems off screen as well as his familiar film persona; he was arrested for illegal possession of alcohol in 1929 during prohibition, and jailed in 1939 for public drunkenness. His illnesses in the late 1930s resulted in fewer calls for his services as a featured performer. He continued appearing in pictures, but only the independent producers of inexpensive features would assign him sizable roles (as in 1936's With Love and Kisses, in which he plays an attorney). The major studios used him only in bit parts. His final role (again playing a drunk) was in the low-budget exploitation film Escort Girl made in 1941; the ravages of his final illness are plainly visible in Housman's now lined face.

== Death ==
Housman died of pulmonary tuberculosis at age 52. He was survived by his wife, Florence (1893–1971).

== Selected filmography ==
- What Happened to Mary (1912, Short) - Principal Comedian
- Jack's Joke (1913, Short) - Ned Brown, His Chum
- It May Be You (1915)
- The Simp and the Sophomores (1915)
- Pennington's Choice (1915)
- Hypno and Trance (1915)
- Red, White and Blue Blood (1917)
- Brown of Harvard (1918)
- With Neatness and Dispatch (1918)
- Back to the Woods (1918)
- The Gay Lord Quex (1919)
- The End of the Road (1919)
- A Fool and His Money (1920)
- The Flapper (1920)
- The Point of View (1920)
- The Road of Ambition (1920)
- The Blooming Angel (1920)
- Is Life Worth Living? (1921)
- Clay Dollars (1921)
- Room and Board (1921)
- The Way of a Maid (1921)
- The Fighter (1921)
- Worlds Apart (1921)
- The Snitching Hour (1922)
- Love's Masquerade (1922)
- Shadows of the Sea (1922)
- Destiny's Isle (1922)
- Why Announce Your Marriage? (1922)
- The Prophet's Paradise (1922)
- Wife in Name Only (1923)
- Nellie, the Beautiful Cloak Model (1924)
- The Masked Dancer (1924)
- The Bat (1926)
- The Midnight Kiss (1926)
- Early to Wed (1926)
- Love Makes 'Em Wild (1927)
- Rough House Rosie (1927)
- Sunrise: A Song of Two Humans (1927)
- Publicity Madness (1927)
- The Singing Fool (1928)
- Sins of the Fathers (1928)
- Queen of the Night Clubs (1929)
- Times Square (1929)
- Fast Company (1929)
- Song of Love (1929)
- The Squealer (1930)
- Feet First (1930)
- Officer O'Brien (1930)
- The Girl of the Golden West (1930)
- Anybody's Blonde (1931)
- Scram! (1932) (Short Subject)
- No More Orchids (1932)
- False Faces (1932)
- Stepping Sisters (1932)
- Movie Crazy (1932)
- The Intruder (1933)
- Her Bodyguard (1933)
- I Believed in You (1934)
- Babes in the Goods (1934) (Short Subject)
- Mrs. Wiggs of the Cabbage Patch (1934)
- The Live Ghost (1934) (Short Subject)
- Here Is My Heart (1934)
- Punch Drunks (1934) (Short Subject)
- The Fixer Uppers (1935) (Short Subject)
- Our Relations (1936)
- With Love and Kisses (1936)
- Racing Blood (1936)
- Youth Takes a Fling (1938)
- The Flying Deuces (1939)
- Go West (1940)
- Billy The Kid (1941)
- Escort Girl (1941)
