= Louise Prussing =

American actress

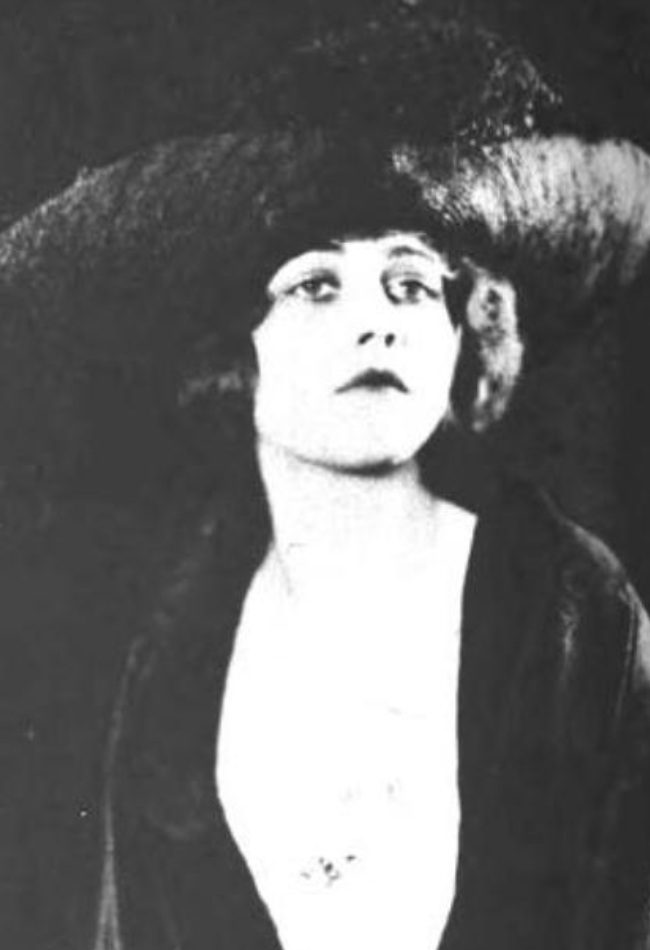
- Louise Prussing, from a 1920 publication
- Born: January 11, 1895; Chicago, Illinois, United States
- Died: March 27, 1994 (aged 99); Los Angeles, California, United States
- Occupation: Actress
- Years active: 1919-1950 (film & TV)

Louise Prussing (1895–1994) was an American stage and film actress. Known primarily for her roles on Broadway, she also appeared in a number of silent films including the 1929 British film The Woman in White.

== Filmography ==
- Out Yonder (1919)
- His Wife's Money (1920)
- A Fool and His Money (1920)
- What's Your Reputation Worth? (1921)
- Worlds Apart (1921)
- The Girl from Nowhere (1921)
- Reckless Youth (1922)
- Jan of the Big Snows (1922)
- The Thoroughbred (1928)
- The Woman in White (1929)
- Before Morning (1933)

== Bibliography ==
- Bordman, Gerald . American Theatre: A Chronicle of Comedy and Drama, 1930-1969. Oxford University Press, 1996.
- Glynn, Stephen. The British Horseracing Film: Representations of the ‘Sport of Kings’ in British Cinema. Springer, 2019.
- McGrath, Patrick J. . John Garfield: The Illustrated Career in Films and on Stage. McFarland, 2006.
