= The Law of the North =

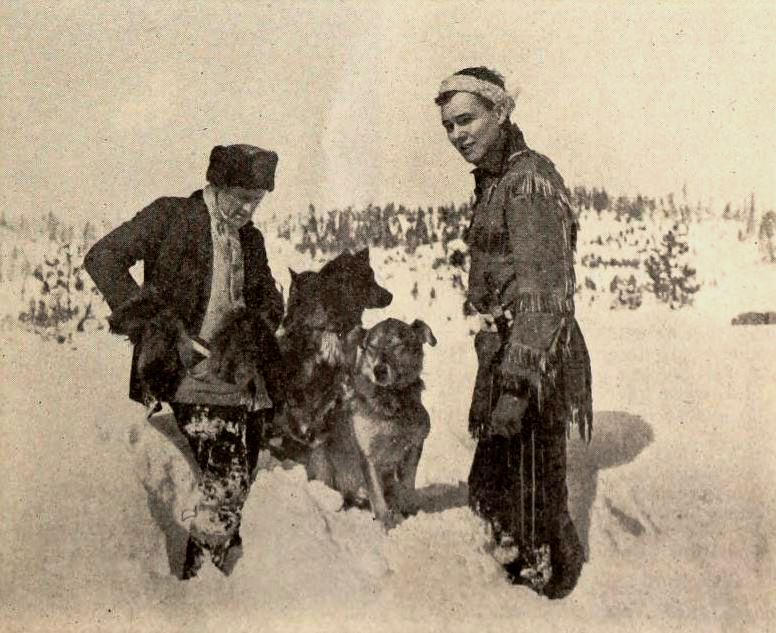
- Still with director Willat and Charles Ray on location in Truckee, California
- Directed by: Irvin Willat
- Screenplay by: Ella Stuart Carson; John Lynch; R. Cecil Smith
- Produced by: Thomas H. Ince
- Starring: Charles Ray; Doris May; Robert McKim; Gloria Hope; Charles K. French; Manuel R. Ojeda
- Cinematography: Chester A. Lyons
- Edited by: Chester A. Lyons
- Production company: Thomas H. Ince Corporation
- Distributed by: Paramount Pictures
- Release date: September 29, 1918
- Running time: 50 minutes
- Country: United States
- Language: Silent (English intertitles)

The Law of the North is a 1918 American silent drama film directed by Irvin Willat, and written by Ella Stuart Carson, John Lynch, and R. Cecil Smith. The film stars Charles Ray, Doris May, Robert McKim, Gloria Hope, Charles K. French, and Manuel R. Ojeda. The film was released on September 29, 1918, by Paramount Pictures. It is not known whether the film currently survives.

== Plot ==
As described in a film magazine, Alain de Montcalm, known as the "Eaglet", lives with his father, the Commandante Michel de Montcalm, and his sister Virginie. Caesar Le Noir, a scoundrel who courts Virginie, is second in command at the trading post. Le Noir is accused by an Indian of having wronged his daughter. Le Noir intimates that Alain is the guilty one and the Commandante soundly thrashes him. That night he persuades Virginie to run away with him. While returning for Virginie's rosary beads, Le Noir is discovered and amidst the struggle kills the Commandante. Alain returns from visiting a nearby trading post and trails Le Noir to a deserted fort, where he brings him to bay. Le Noir sends word to Alain that he will kill Virginie if Alain does not cease firing. Virginie is wounded and Le Noir escapes. Alain follows and comes upon Le Noir's daughter Therese almost dead in the snow. He takes her to his cabin and is overjoyed to find that Virginie has reached home before him and is recuperating. Le Noir is later killed in an accident and eaten by wolves, and Therese forgives Alain.

== Cast ==
- Charles Ray as Alain de Montcalm
- Doris May as Therese Le Noir
- Robert McKim as Caesar Le Noir
- Gloria Hope as Virginie de Montcalm
- Charles K. French as Michel de Montcalm
- Manuel R. Ojeda as Numa

== Reception ==
Like many American films of the time, The Law of the North was subject to cuts by city and state film censorship boards. For example, the Chicago Board of Censors required a cut, in Reel 1, of the three intertitles "Listened and sinned and now the squaws point to her with scorn", "You are a scoundrel and should be made to marry her", and "I lied to shield your brother", Reel 2, Le Noir holding knife preparatory to stabbing the man, Reel 3, the two intertitles "I am going to mate you lower than the wolves" and "You may yet have a white squaw, Numa", closeup of Indian holding young white woman in embrace and suggestively leering at her, first two den scenes showing squaws sitting on men's laps, in vision of murder eliminate scene in which Le Noir pulls out knife, two scenes of Le Noir forcibly kissing young woman, Reel 4, last scene of Indian sitting outside of young woman's door where his face registers his intention to commit rape, the intertitle "You may yet have white squaw" and vision of man struggling with young woman, and Indian going to young woman's bed and pulling off sheet.
