= The Claws of the Hun =

- Lobby card
- Directed by: Victor Schertzinger
- Screenplay by: Ella Stuart Carson; R. Cecil Smith
- Produced by: Thomas H. Ince
- Starring: Charles Ray; Jane Novak; Robert McKim; Dorcas Matthews; Melbourne MacDowell; Mollie McConnell
- Cinematography: Chester A. Lyons
- Production company: Thomas H. Ince Corporation
- Distributed by: Paramount Pictures
- Release date: June 30, 1918
- Running time: 50 minutes
- Country: United States
- Language: Silent (English intertitles)

The Claws of the Hun is a 1918 American silent drama film directed by Victor Schertzinger and written by Ella Stuart Carson and R. Cecil Smith. The film stars Charles Ray, Jane Novak, Robert McKim, Dorcas Matthews, Melbourne MacDowell, and Mollie McConnell. The film was released on June 30, 1918, by Paramount Pictures.

== Plot ==
A propaganda film about a bad agent trying to find the secret formula for an explosive.

== Cast ==
- Charles Ray as John Stanton
- Jane Novak as Virginia Lee
- Robert McKim as Alfred Werner
- Dorcas Matthews as Muriel Charters
- Melbourne MacDowell as Godfrey Stanton
- Mollie McConnell as Mrs. Godfrey Stanton
- Henry A. Barrows

== Reception ==
Like many American films of the time, The Claws of the Hun was subject to cuts by city and state film censorship boards. For example, the Chicago Board of Censors cut, in Reel 5, scene of man's hand in press, three scenes of man turning press, and shooting the American boy.
