= Cleopatra (1928 film) =

1928 film

- Directed by: R. William Neill
- Written by: Natalie Kalmus
- Screenplay by: Leon Abrams
- Story by: Natalie Kalmus
- Produced by: Herbert T. Kalmus
- Starring: Dorothy Revier; Robert Ellis; Serge Temoff; Will Walling; Ben Hendricks Jr. Evelyn Selbie
- Cinematography: George Cave
- Edited by: Aubrey Scotto
- Production companies: Metro-Goldwyn-Mayer; Technicolor Corporation
- Distributed by: Metro-Goldwyn-Mayer
- Release date: June 13, 1928
- Running time: 20 minutes
- Country: United States
- Languages: Silent; English intertitles
- Budget: $20,881.37

Cleopatra is a 1928 American Metro-Goldwyn-Mayer silent fictionalized film, shot in two-color Technicolor. It was the sixth short produced as part of Metro-Goldwyn-Mayer's "Great Events" series of short silent films. The film, also known as Three Nights with Cleopatra was produced by Herbert T. Kalmus and the film was directed by Roy William Neill.

== Plot summary ==
Cleopatra battles her bother Ptolemy for the throne of Egypt.

== Cast ==
- Dorothy Revier as Cleopatra
- Robert Ellis as Marc Antony
- Serge Temoff
- Will Walling
- Ben Hendricks Jr. as Octavius Caesar
- Evelyn Selbie as Charmian

== Production ==
The film was shot at the Tec-Art Studio in Hollywood, California.

== Preservation status ==
A complete print of this film was preserved in 1993 by Cinema Arts Laboratory and is held by the George Eastman Museum.
