= Richard Neill =

American actor

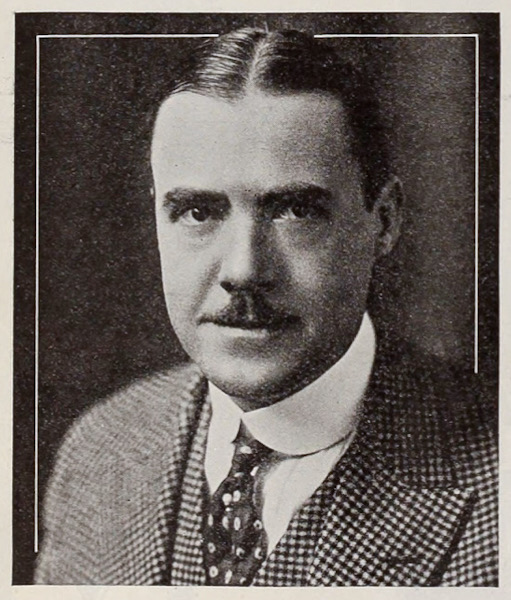
- Motion Picture News, 1916
- Born: Richard Renchaw Neill, Jr. November 12, 1875; Philadelphia, Pennsylvania, United States
- Died: April 8, 1970 (aged 94); Woodland Hills, Los Angeles, United States
- Occupations: Actor, screenwriter
- Years active: 1910–1961
- Spouse(s): Grace Jerome Williams (m. 1915-1970; his death)

Richard Renchaw Neill Jr. (November 12, 1875 – April 8, 1970) was an American actor and screenwriter who worked in both the silent and sound eras. He performed in more than 200 films from 1910 to 1959, and during the early part of his long screen career, he wrote "several scenarios" for productions. Born in Philadelphia, Pennsylvania, he died in the Woodland Hills neighborhood of Los Angeles.

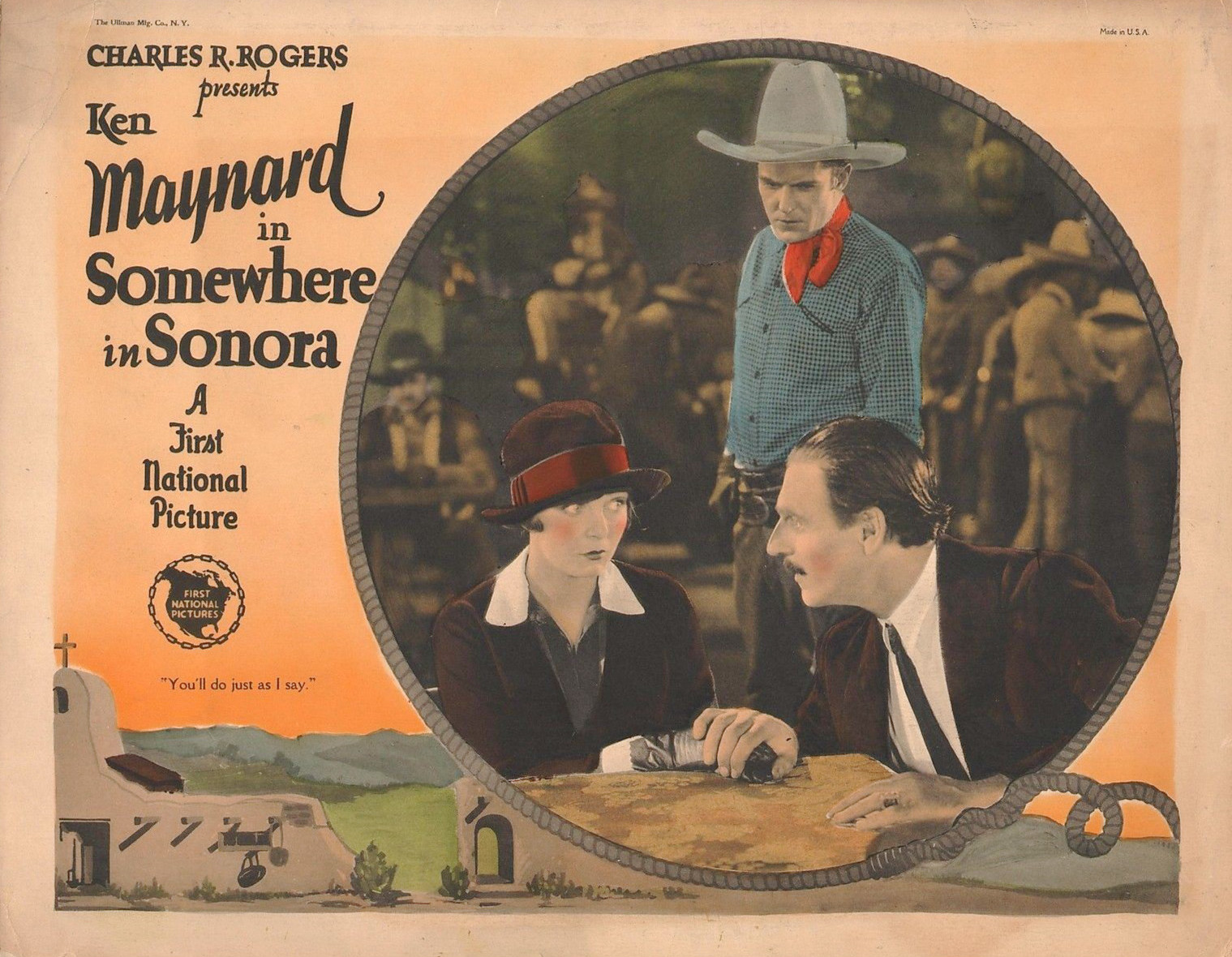
Lobby card showing Neill (right) in Somewhere in Sonora (1923)

== Partial filmography ==
- The Lighthouse by the Sea (1911, Short) - The Lighthouse Keeper's Son
- The Charge of the Light Brigade (1912)
- The Substitute Stenographer (1913, Short)
- Dolly of the Dailies (1914, Serial) - High Officer of the Secret Society [Ch. 5]
- Fantasma (1914) - The Princess' Father
- Colonel Carter of Cartersville (1915) - Robert Gill
- The Broken Law (1915) - Gaspar
- The Labyrinth (1915) - Rev. Herbert Fenton
- The Man Who Found Himself (1915) - Himself, Cameo Appearance (uncredited)
- The Fool's Revenge (1916) - Randall
- A Modern Thelma (1916)
- God's Half Acre (1916) - Perry Westley
- A Wall Street Tragedy (1916) - Ranson
- The Ragged Princess (1916) - Thomas Deigan
- The Battle of Life (1916) - O'Leary
- A Child of the Wild (1917)
- Love's Law (1917)
- The Co-Respondent (1917)
- The Woman in White (1917)
- Her Second Husband (1917)
- The Road to France (1918)
- His Wife's Friend (1919)
- The Plunger (1920)
- Go Get 'Em Hutch (1922)
- A Clouded Name (1923)
- Sinner or Saint (1923)
- Heritage of the Desert (1924)
- The Fighting Coward (1924)
- Wanderer of the Wasteland (1924)
- Percy (1925)
- Tumbleweeds (1925)
- Born to the West (1926)
- Satan Town (1926)
- The Trunk Mystery (1926)
- Galloping Thunder (1927)
- The Fightin' Comeback (1927)
- The Desert of the Lost (1927)
- Bulldog Pluck (1927)
- Somewhere in Sonora (1927)
- The Man Without a Face (1928)
- Beyond the Sierras (1928)
- The Law's Lash (1928)
- The Bushranger (1928)
- The King of the Kongo (1929)
- Where East is East (1929)
- The Last Frontier (1932)
- Jiggs and Maggie in Court (1948)
