= The Fighter (1921 film) =

1921 silent film

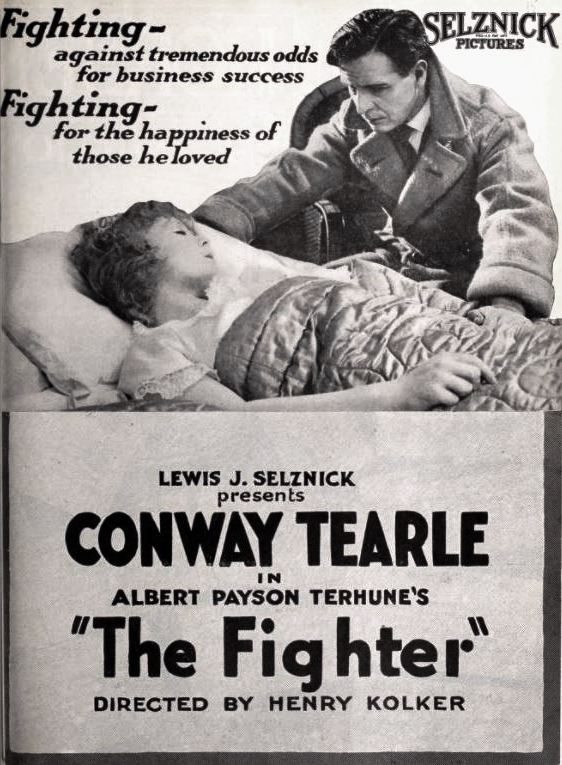
- Directed by: Henry Kolker
- Written by: R. Cecil Smith; Albert Payson Terhune
- Produced by: Lewis J. Selznick
- Starring: Conway Tearle; Winifred Westover; Arthur Housman
- Production company: Selznick Pictures
- Distributed by: Select Pictures
- Release date: July 1921
- Running time: 50 minutes
- Country: United States
- Languages: Silent; English intertitles

The Fighter is a 1921 American silent drama film directed by Henry Kolker and starring Conway Tearle, Winifred Westover and Arthur Housman.

== Cast ==
- Conway Tearle as Caleb Conover
- Winifred Westover as Dey Shevlin
- Arthur Housman as Blacardo
- Ernest Lawford as Caine
- George Stewart as Jack Standish
- Warren Cook as Senator Burke
- Helen Lindroth as Mrs. Hawarden

== Bibliography ==
- Munden, Kenneth White. The American Film Institute Catalog of Motion Pictures Produced in the United States, Part 1. University of California Press, 1997.
