= Madame du Barry (1928 film) =

1928 film

- Directed by: R. William Neill
- Written by: Jack Cunningham
- Screenplay by: Jack Cunningham
- Produced by: Herbert T. Kalmus
- Starring: Priscilla Dean; Mahlon Hamilton
- Cinematography: George Cave
- Edited by: Natalie Kalmus
- Production companies: Metro-Goldwyn-Mayer; Technicolor Corporation
- Distributed by: Metro-Goldwyn-Mayer
- Release date: November 17, 1928
- Country: United States
- Languages: Silent; English Intertitles

Madame du Barry is a 1928 MGM short silent fictionalized film short in two-color Technicolor. It was the eighth film produced as part of Metro-Goldwyn-Mayer's "Great Events" series, and the last to be released before the new year.

== Cast ==
- Priscilla Dean as Madame DuBarry
- Mahlon Hamilton as Louis XV
- George Davis
- Denis Auburn
- Bill Elliott (as Gordon Elliott)
- David Mir
- Charles Thurston

== Production ==
The film was shot at the Tec-Art Studio in Hollywood.

== Preservation Status ==
Madame du Barry has not survived in its original two-reel form. 800 feet of 35mm material from the second reel has been preserved by the Library of Congress in Washington, DC.
