= The Woman in White (1917 film) =

- Directed by: Ernest C. Warde
- Screenplay by: Lloyd Lonergan
- Based on: The Woman in White; 1860 novel by Wilkie Collins
- Produced by: Edwin Thanhouser
- Starring: Florence La Badie; Richard R. Neill; Gertrude Dallas
- Cinematography: William M. Zollinger
- Distributed by: Pathé Exchange
- Release date: July 1, 1917 (United States)
- Running time: 68 min
- Country: United States
- Language: English

The Woman in White is a 1917 American drama film directed by Ernest C. Warde and starring Florence La Badie, Richard R. Neill, and Gertrude Dallas. It comprises five reels of 4,627 feet and had its premiere on July 1, 1917. Length: 1 hour 8 minutes. The film was originally distributed by Pathé. In the 1920s it was re-released under the title The Unfortunate Marriage.

== Plot ==
As described in a film magazine review, Laura Fairlie (Florence La Badie) marries Sir Pervival Glyde (Richard R. Neill) as a result of her father's last request. Shortly after her marriage, Ann Catherick (also played by Florence La Badie), known as the "woman in white" and who resembles Laura, comes to Laura and tells her of Glyde's past, making Laura unhappy. Marian (Gertrude Dallas), Laura's half sister, learns from Laura the true state of affairs and decides to keep an eye on Sir Pervival. Through the efforts of Marian, Laura is saved from an unhappy fate.

== Cast ==
- Florence La Badie - double role as Laura Fairlie and Ann Catherick
- Richard R. Neill - Sir Pervival Glyde
- Gertrude Dallas - Marian Holcombe
- Arthur Bauer - Count Fosco
- Wayne Arey - Walter Hartridge
- J.H. Gilmour
- Claude Cooper

== Reception ==
Like many American films of the time, The Woman in White was subject to cuts by city and state film censorship boards. The Chicago Board of Censors required the cutting of two intertitles, "Patience, my friend, something tells me your wife will not enjoy good health here" and "Yes, my friend, the crazy woman is critically ill - she will not trouble you long."

== Survival status ==
Prints of the film exist in the Library of Congress film archive.
