= The Silent Man (film) =

1917 film

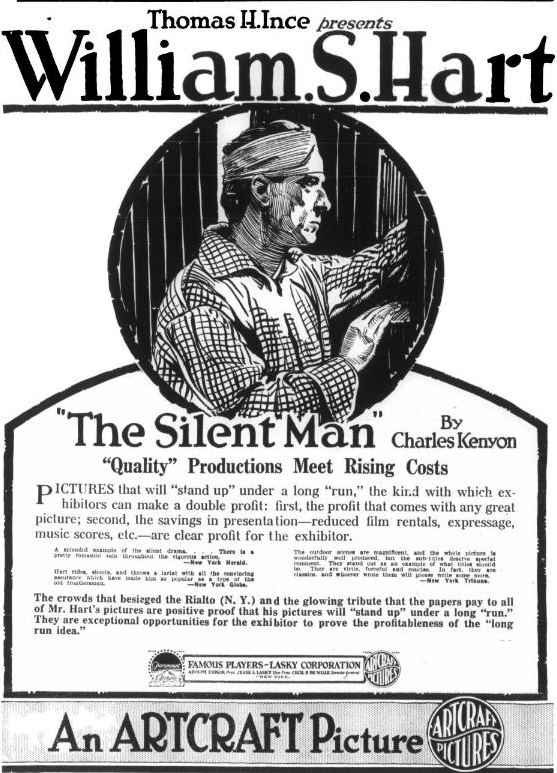
- Advertisement
- Directed by: William S. Hart
- Screenplay by: Charles Kenyon
- Produced by: William S. Hart; Thomas H. Ince
- Starring: William S. Hart; Vola Vale; Robert McKim; Dorcas Matthews; J. P. Lockney; George Nichols; Gertrude Claire
- Cinematography: Joseph H. August
- Production companies: Famous Players–Lasky Corporation; Artcraft Pictures Corporation; William S. Hart Productions
- Distributed by: Paramount Pictures
- Release date: November 26, 1917
- Running time: 61 minutes
- Country: United States
- Languages: Silent; English intertitles

The Silent Man is a 1917 American silent Western film directed by William S. Hart and written by Charles Kenyon. The film stars William S. Hart, Vola Vale, Robert McKim, Dorcas Matthews, J. P. Lockney, George Nichols, and Gertrude Claire. It was released on November 26, 1917, by Paramount Pictures. The movie premiered in Los Angeles at Sid Grauman's Million Dollar Theater.

== Plot ==
As described in a film magazine, 'Silent' Budd Marr comes to the town of Bakeoven to spend some of the gold for which he had labored so hard. Through Handsome Jack Pressley he gets into a fight, and is confined to bed for a couple of weeks during which his claim is stolen. All efforts to regain his property are unsuccessful, so when he finds the claim jumpers loading their loot on the stage coach, he holds it up, and at the same time rescues Betty Bryce, a young woman Pressley had lured with the promise of marriage to work in his dance hall. As the girl learns the true nature of Pressley she is thankful and soon falls in love with Budd. A stranger known as Uncle Grubstake has become friendly with Bud and Betty's brother David, and when the citizens attempt to hang Budd for robbing the coach, Grubstake reveals his true identity as a federal agent, and has the evidence that gets Pressley and his gang arrested. Budd and Betty end up happy.

== Cast ==
- William S. Hart as 'Silent' Budd Marr
- Vola Vale as Betty Bryce
- Robert McKim as Handsome Jack Pressley
- Dorcas Matthews as Topaz
- J. P. Lockney as 'Grubstake' Higgins
- George Nichols as Preachin' Bill Hardy
- Gertrude Claire as Mrs. Hardy
- Milton Ross as Ames Mitchell
- Harold Goodwin as David Bryce

== Reception ==
Like many American films of the time, The Silent Man was subject to cuts by city and state film censorship boards. For example, the Chicago Board of Censors required a cut, in Reel 1, of the intertitle "Region God left unfinished and cursed" etc., to flash five snake scenes, cut two scenes of young woman drinking at bar with men, five roulette scenes, flash adjustment of roulette wheel, from the intertitle "You ought to remember this dress" etc. remove the words "when I was good", Reel 2, the shooting of Hart, Reel 3, change holdup scenes to eliminate actual theft, Reel 4, eliminate three intertitles "Go get the change" etc., "You made a thief of me" etc., and "Now I will expose your hand" and replace with "You forced the act which made me appear a thief", and, Reel 5, two scenes of horse dragging Pressley.

== Preservation ==
Copies of the film are in the Library of Congress and UCLA Film & Television Archive, and it has been released on DVD.

== Gallery ==
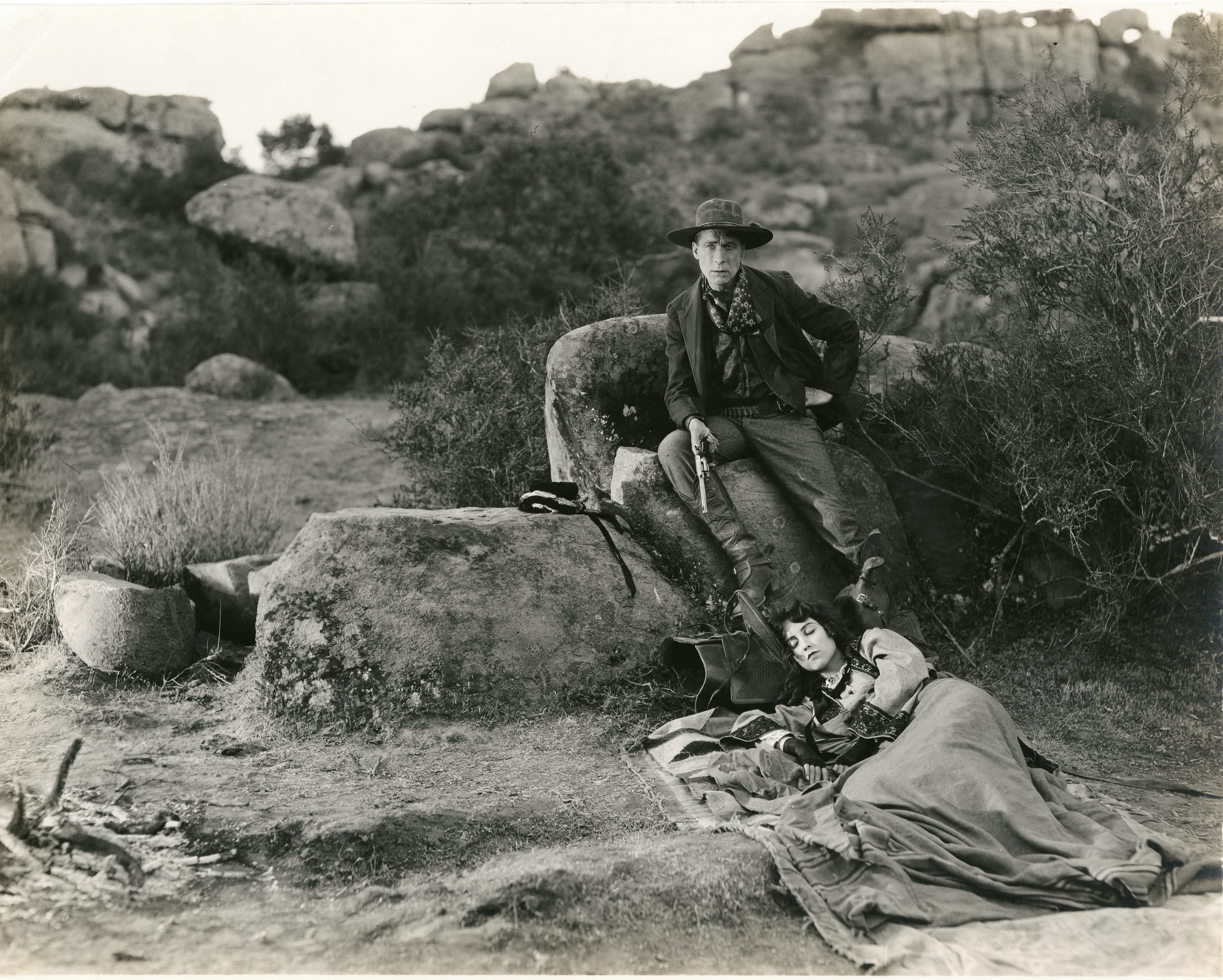
Promotional photograph featuring William S. Hart and Vola Vale

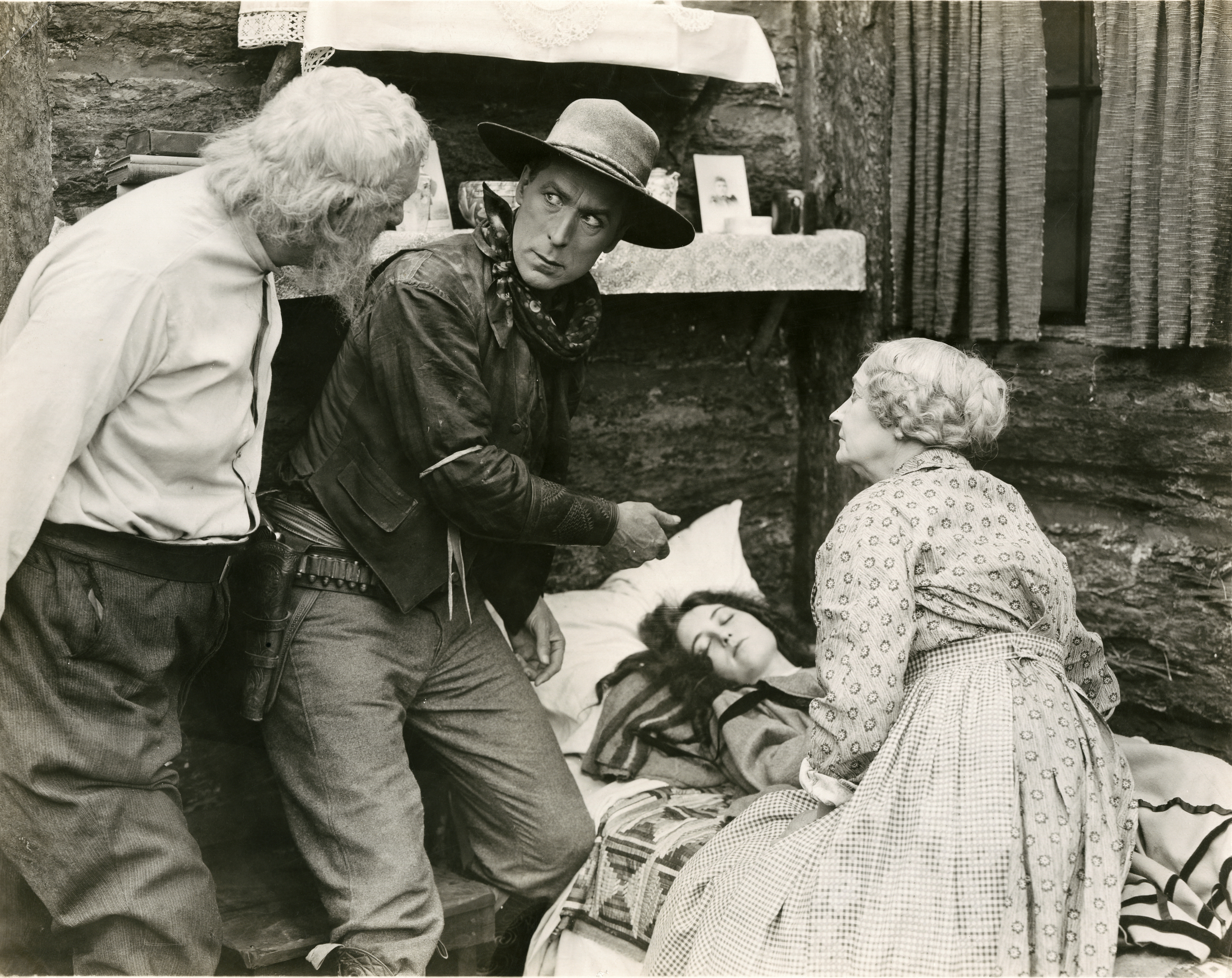
Promotional photograph featuring William S. Hart, Vola Vale, and Gertrude Claire

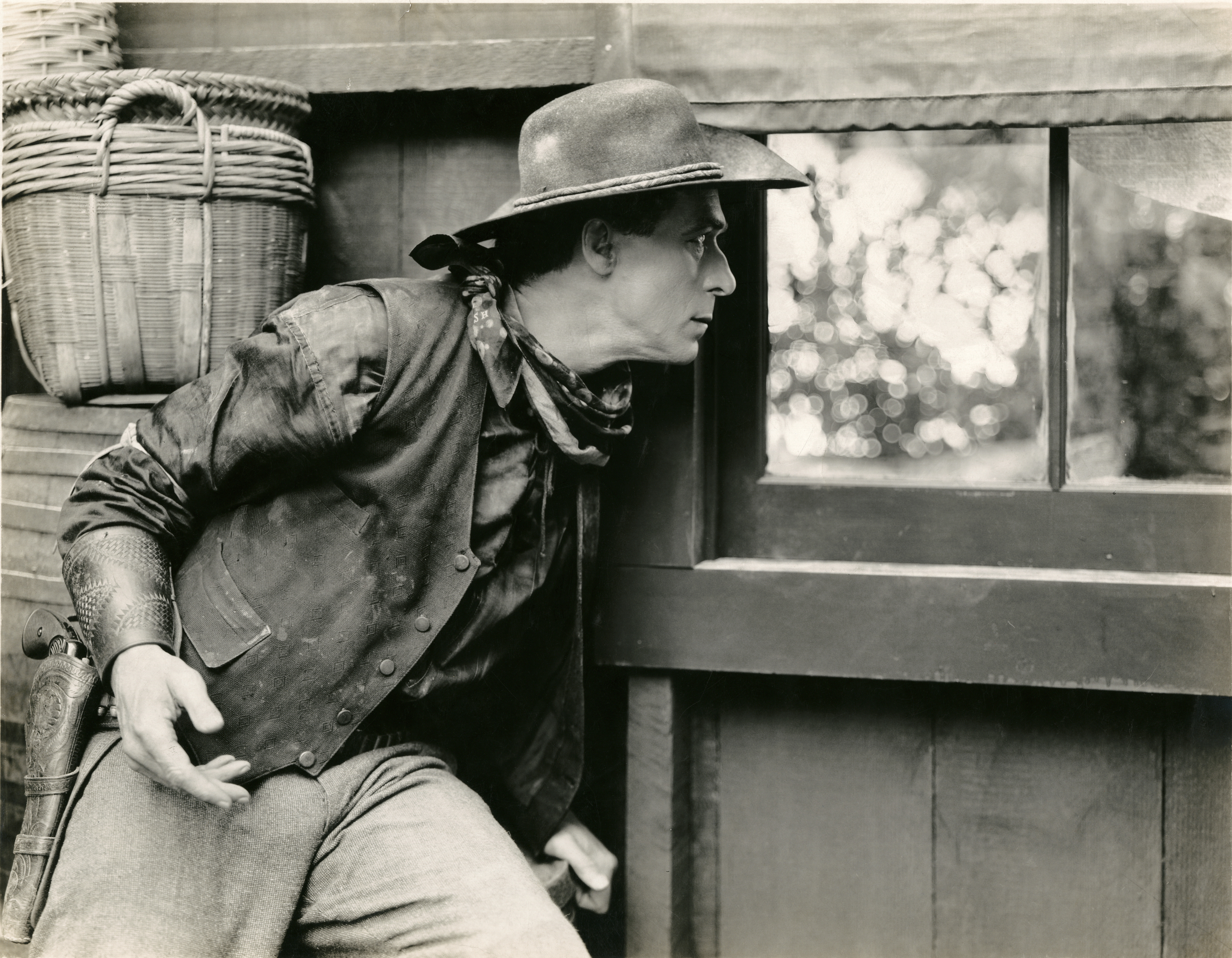
Promotional photograph featuring William S. Hart

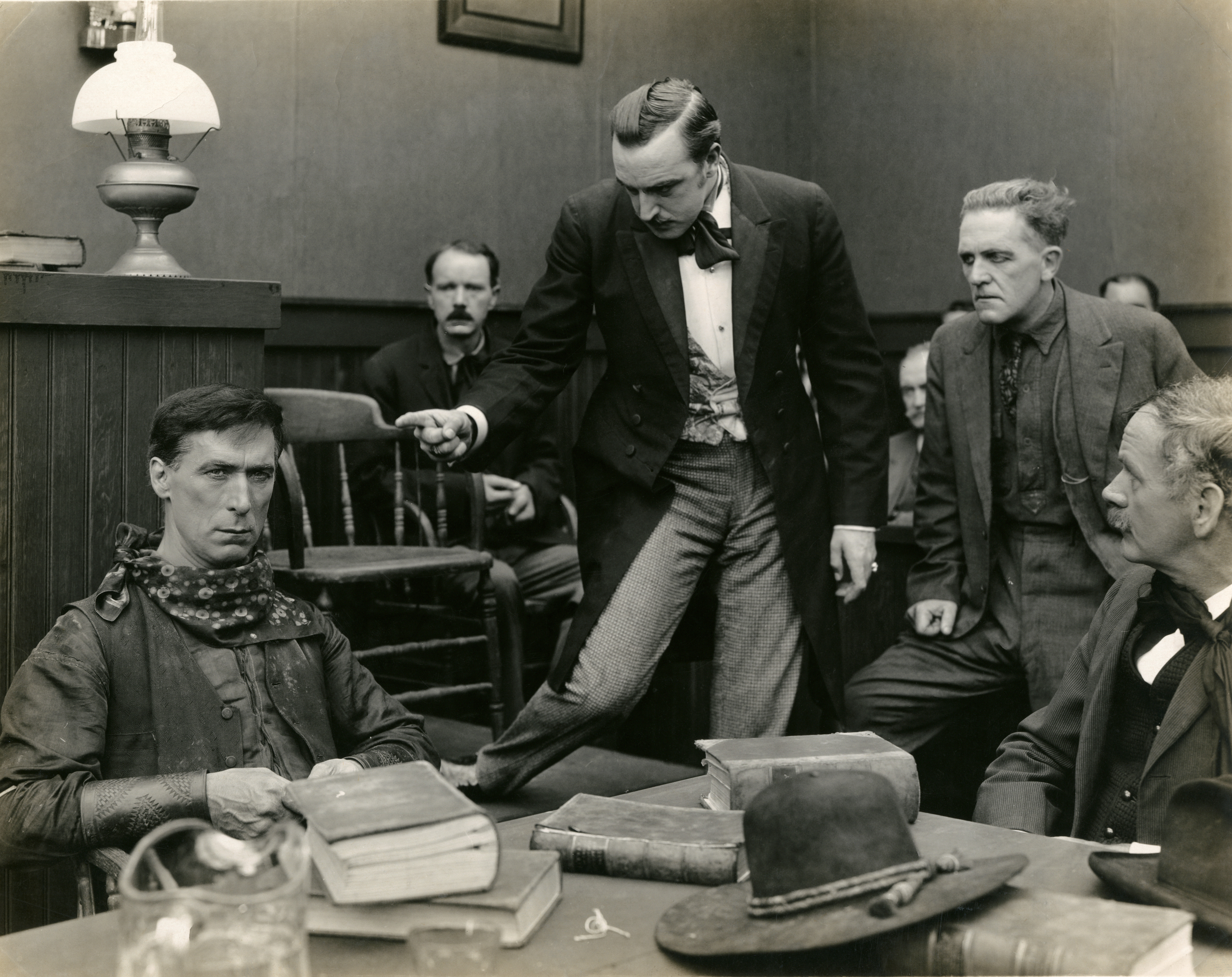
Promotional photograph featuring Robert McKim in the center
