= Gilded Lies =

1921 film

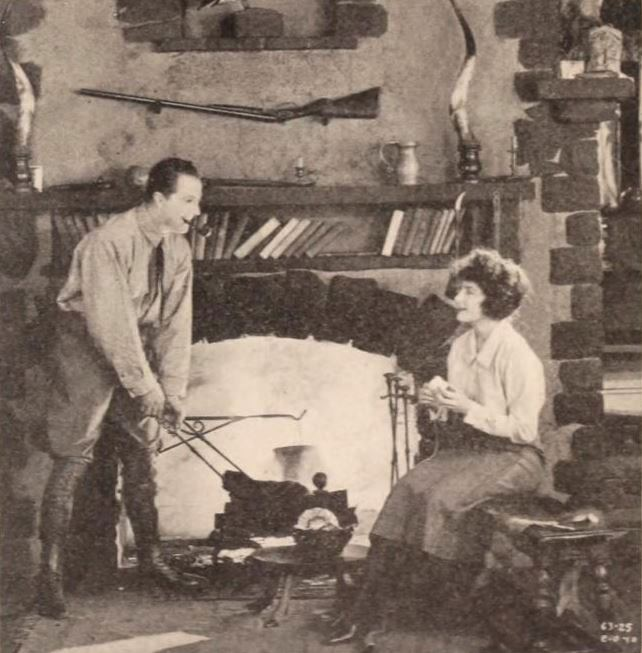
- Directed by: William P.S. Earle
- Written by: John Lynch; R. Cecil Smith
- Produced by: Lewis J. Selznick
- Starring: Eugene O'Brien; Martha Mansfield; Frank Whitson
- Cinematography: Jules Cronjager
- Production company: Selznick Pictures
- Distributed by: Select Pictures
- Release date: March 4, 1921
- Running time: 50 minutes
- Country: United States
- Languages: Silent; English intertitles

Gilded Lies is a 1921 American silent drama film directed by William P.S. Earle and starring Eugene O'Brien, Martha Mansfield and Frank Whitson.

== Cast ==
- Eugene O'Brien as Keene McComb
- Martha Mansfield as Hester Thorpe
- Frank Whitson as Martin Ward
- George Stewart as Andrew Scott
- Arthur Donaldson as Major Burns

== Bibliography ==
- Connelly, Robert B. The Silents: Silent Feature Films, 1910-36, Volume 40, Issue 2. December Press, 1998. ISBN 978-0-91320-436-8.
- Munden, Kenneth White. The American Film Institute Catalog of Motion Pictures Produced in the United States, Part 1. University of California Press, 1997. ISBN 978-0-52020-969-5.
