= Worlds Apart (1921 film) =

1921 film

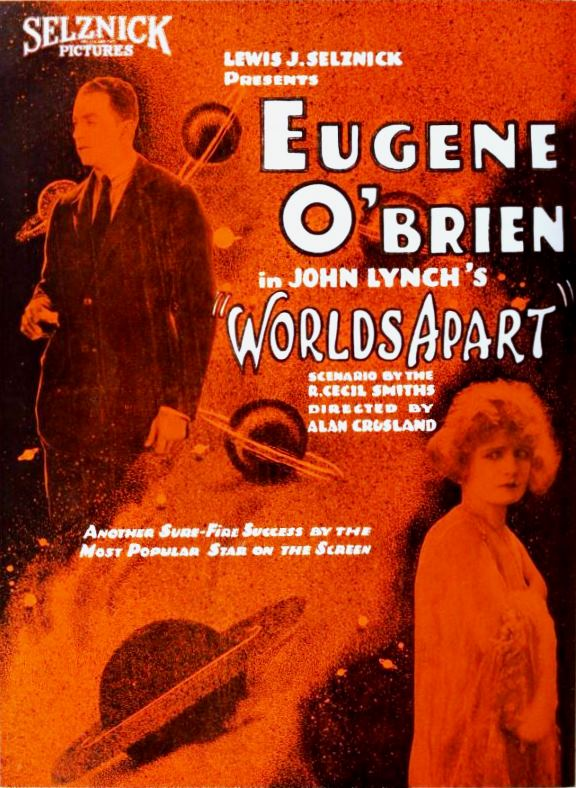
- Directed by: Alan Crosland
- Written by: John Lynch; R. Cecil Smith
- Produced by: Lewis J. Selznick
- Starring: Eugene O'Brien; Olive Tell; William H. Tooker
- Cinematography: Jules Cronjager
- Production company: Selznick Pictures
- Distributed by: Select Pictures
- Release date: January 1921
- Country: United States
- Language: Silent (English intertitles)

Worlds Apart is a lost 1921 American silent mystery film directed by Alan Crosland and starring Eugene O'Brien, Olive Tell and William H. Tooker.

== Cast ==
- Eugene O'Brien as Hugh Ledyard
- Olive Tell as Elinor Ashe
- William H. Tooker as Peter Lester
- Florence Billings as Marcia Marshall
- Arthur Housman as Harley Marshall
- Louise Prussing as Phyllis Leigh
- Warren Cook as Ten Eyck

== Bibliography ==
- Monaco, James. The Encyclopedia of Film. Perigee Books, 1991.
