= Broadway and Home =

1920 film directed by Alan Crosland

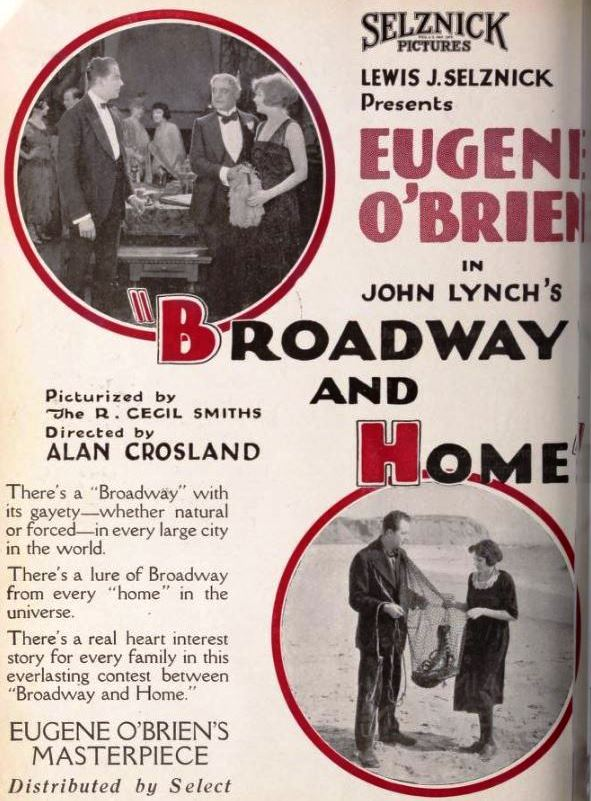
- Directed by: Alan Crosland
- Written by: John Lynch; R. Cecil Smith
- Starring: Eugene O'Brien; Elinor Fair; Warren Cook
- Production company: Selznick Pictures
- Distributed by: Select Pictures
- Release date: December 10, 1920
- Country: United States
- Language: Silent (English intertitles)

Broadway and Home is a 1920 American silent drama film directed by Alan Crosland and starring Eugene O'Brien, Elinor Fair and Warren Cook.

== Cast ==
- Eugene O'Brien as Michael Strange
- Elinor Fair as Mary Bruce
- Warren Cook as John Stephens
- Frank Losee as Paul Grayson
- Ellen Cassidy as Laura Greer

== Bibliography ==
- Monaco, James. The Encyclopedia of Film. Perigee Books, 1991.
