= The Lady of Victories =

1928 film

- Directed by: R. William Neill
- Written by: Russell Hickson
- Produced by: Herbert T. Kalmus
- Starring: Agnes Ayres; George Irving; Otto Matieson
- Cinematography: George Cave
- Edited by: Aubrey Scotto
- Production companies: Metro-Goldwyn-Mayer; Technicolor Corporation
- Distributed by: Metro-Goldwyn-Mayer
- Release date: January 21, 1928
- Country: United States
- Languages: Silent, English Intertitles
- Budget: $23,169.28

The Lady of Victories is a 1928 MGM silent fictionalized film short in two-color Technicolor. It was the third short film produced as part of Metro-Goldwyn-Mayer's "Great Events" series.

== Production ==
The film began production at the Tec-Art Studio in Hollywood on November 21, 1927, and wrapped on November 26. It was the first of the "Great Events" shorts to credit Andre Chotin art director. The production featured some of experimental nighttime exterior scenes, a risky artistic and technical undertaking at the time, because of the amount of light needed for proper exposure on Technicolor's film stock.

== Release ==
The film accompanied the Charlie Chaplin silent feature The Circus (1928 film) in many theaters during its initial release.

== Preservation Status ==
The Lady of Victories has been partially preserved, with 1,000 foot fragments preserved by EYE Film Institute, the George Eastman House, and the UCLA Film and Television Archive.
