= Warren Cook =

American actor

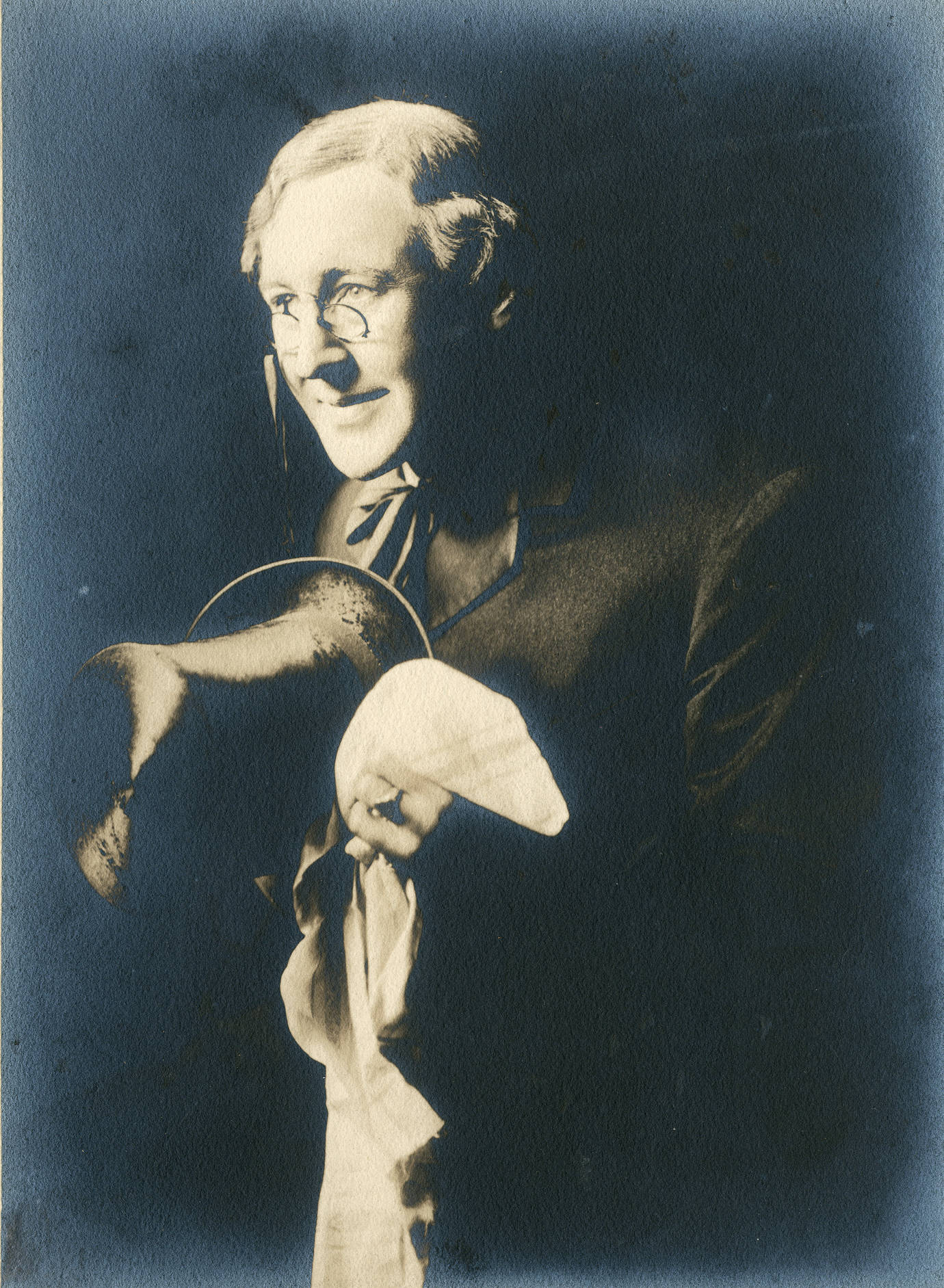
- Cook in 1908
- Born: May 23, 1878; Boston, Massachusetts, U.S.
- Died: May 2, 1939 (aged 60); New York City, U.S.
- Occupation: Actor
- Years active: 1901–1927

Warren Cook (May 23, 1878 – May 2, 1939) was an American film actor of the silent era. Cook was born in Boston, Massachusetts. In 1901, he appeared in The Shaughraun at the Castle Square Theatre in Boston. He was part of the stock company based at Castle Square Theatre. On Broadway, Cook appeared in The Conspiracy 1912). He had minor roles and appeared in more than 60 films between 1914 and 1927.

The beginning of sound films brought an end to Cook's career. When he died on May 2, 1939, he was living at an actor's home in East Islip, New York.

== Selected filmography ==
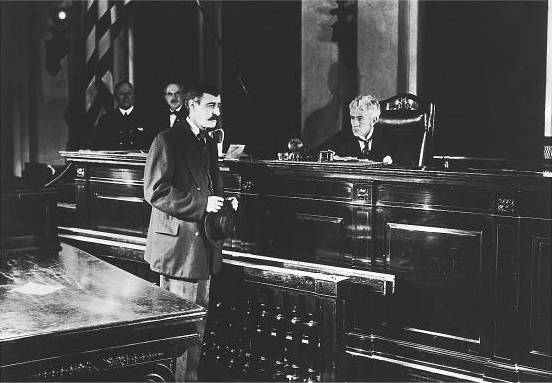
Cook (left) in The Immigrant (1917)

- The Man Who Disappeared (1914)
- Children of Eve (1915)
- Slander (1916)
- The Snowbird (1916)
- Infidelity (1917)
- The Whip (1917)
- The Undying Flame (1917)
- Seven Keys to Baldpate (1917)
- The Avenging Trail (1917)
- The Streets of Illusion (1917)
- The Interloper (1918)
- Suspicion (1918)
- A Doll's House (1918)
- Woman (1918)
- The Challenge Accepted (1918)
- Five Thousand an Hour (1918)
- The Whirlpool (1918)
- My Lady's Garter (1919)
- The Unveiling Hand (1919)
- A Manhattan Knight (1920)
- The Woman God Sent (1920)
- The Flapper (1920)
- Lady Rose's Daughter (1920)
- Whispers (1920)
- Civilian Clothes (1920)
- The Point of View (1920)
- Broadway and Home (1920)
- A Man of Stone (1921)
- The Girl from Nowhere (1921)
- The Last Door (1921)
- The Fighter (1921)
- Is Life Worth Living? (1921)
- Worlds Apart (1921)
- Conceit (1921)
- John Smith (1922)
- Slim Shoulders (1922)
- Dark Secrets (1923)
- The Broken Violin (1923)
- The Silent Command (1923)
- His Darker Self (1924)
- The Truth About Women (1924)
- Wild, Wild Susan (1925)
- Shore Leave (1925)
- Lew Tyler's Wives (1926)
- The Lunatic at Large (1927)
