= Edmund Goulding =

British director and screenwriter (1891–1959)

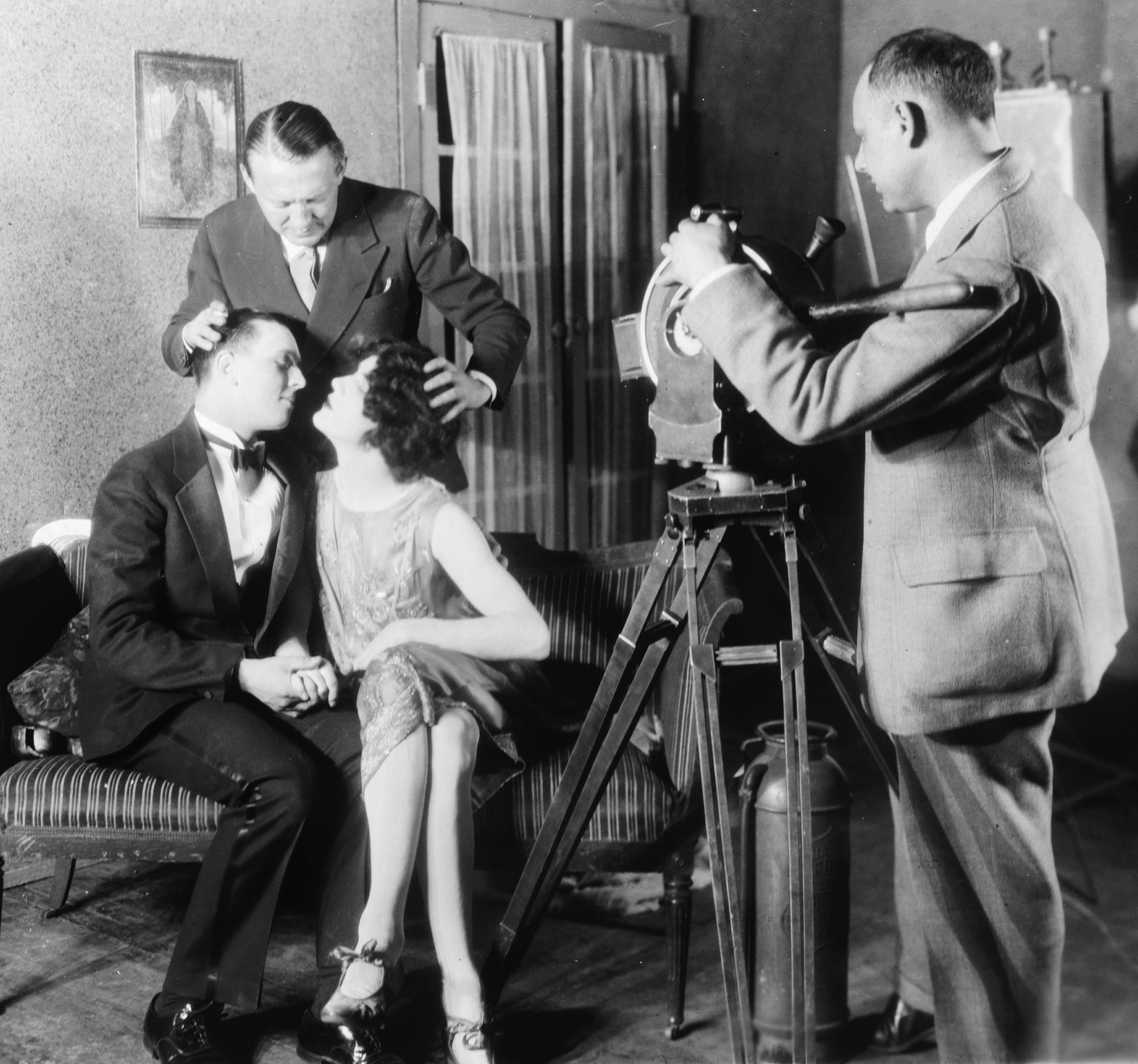
- Goulding helping position actors for a kiss while making a film with the motion picture class at Columbia University in 1927
- Born: 20 March 1891; Feltham, Middlesex, England
- Died: 24 December 1959 (aged 68); Los Angeles, California, US
- Occupations: Film director, writer
- Years active: 1916–1958
- Spouse: Marjorie Moss (m. 1931; died 1935)

Edmund Goulding (20 March 1891 – 24 December 1959) was a British screenwriter and film director. As an actor early in his career he was one of the 'Ghosts' in the 1922 silent film Three Live Ghosts alongside Norman Kerry and Cyril Chadwick. Also in the early 1920s he wrote several screenplays for star Mae Murray for films directed by her then-husband Robert Z. Leonard. Goulding is best remembered for directing cultured dramas such as Love (1927), Grand Hotel (1932) with Greta Garbo and Joan Crawford, Dark Victory (1939) with Bette Davis, The Constant Nymph (1943) with Joan Fontaine, and The Razor's Edge (1946) with Gene Tierney and Tyrone Power. He also directed the classic film noir Nightmare Alley (1947) with Tyrone Power and Joan Blondell, and the action drama The Dawn Patrol. He was also a successful songwriter, composer, and producer.

== Biography ==
Before moving to films, Goulding was an actor, playwright and director on the London stage.

Interviewed about his Goulding biography Edmund Goulding's Dark Victory (2009), film historian Matthew Kennedy stated:

He not only directed many types of films, but he took on multiple functions on each set. Though he didn't usually take credit, he co-wrote many scripts, composed incidental music, produced, even consulted on makeup, costumes, and hair styling. His one blind spot in production seems to be the camera...When shooting a scene, Eddie was intent on capturing performers at their best and most truthful, but he left the mechanics of filming to his cameramen...he seemed adept at just about everything — comedy (Everybody Does It, We're Not Married!), ensemble dramas (Grand Hotel), family relations (White Banners, Claudia), war (The Dawn Patrol, We Are Not Alone), psychiatry (The Flame Within), show business (Blondie of the Follies), male-female relationships (The Devil's Holiday, Riptide), and even existentialism (The Razor's Edge) and the dark arts of spiritism (Nightmare Alley).

Together with Jack Conway, Goulding holds the distinction of having directed the most Best Picture-nominated films without ever receiving a nomination for Best Director, with three (Grand Hotel, which won the award; Dark Victory; and The Razor's Edge).

Goulding died during heart surgery at Cedars of Lebanon Hospital in Los Angeles, California. He was buried at the Forest Lawn Memorial Park in Glendale, California.

== Filmography ==
Year	Title	Production co.	Cast	Notes
Silent films
1916	Little Lady Eileen	Paramount	Marguerite Clark, Vernon Steele	co-written with Betty T. Fitzgerald
1916	The Quest of Life	Paramount	Florence Walton, Julian L'Estrange	Based on one of his plays
1917	The Silent Partner	Paramount	Blanche Sweet, Thomas Meighan	Screenwriter
1918	The Ordeal of Rosetta	Select	Alice Brady, Crauford Kent	Screenwriter
1919	The Imp	Selznick	Elsie Janis, Joe King	Screenwriter
1919	The Perfect Lover	Selznick	Eugene O'Brien, Marguerite Courtot	Screenwriter
1919	The Glorious Lady	Selznick	Olive Thomas, Evelyn Brent	Screenwriter
1919	A Regular Girl	Selznick	Elsie Janis, Matt Moore	Screenwriter
1919	Sealed Hearts	Selznick	Eugene O'Brien, Robert Edeson	Screenwriter
1920	A Daughter of Two Worlds	First National	Norma Talmadge, Frank Sheridan	Screenwriter
1920	Madonnas and Men	Independent	Anders Randolf, Edmund Lowe, Gustav von Seyffertitz	Screenwriter
1920	The Dangerous Paradise	Selznick	Louise Huff, Harry Benham	Screenwriter
1920	The Sin That Was His	Selznick	William Faversham, Lucy Cotton	Screenwriter
1921	The Devil	Pathé Exchange	George Arliss, Lucy Cotton	Screenwriter
1921	Dangerous Toys	Independent	Marguerite Clayton, William Desmond	Screenwriter
1921	A Man of Stone	Selznick	Conway Tearle, Martha Mansfield	Screenwriter
1921	Tol'able David	First National	Richard Barthelmess, Gladys Hulette, Ernest Torrence	Screenwriter
1922	Peacock Alley	Metro	Mae Murray, Edmund Lowe	Screenwriter
1922	Three Live Ghosts	Paramount	Norman Kerry, Anna Q. Nilsson	Actor
1922	Till We Meet Again	Independent	Mae Marsh, Walter Miller	Screenwriter
1922	The Seventh Day	First National	Richard Barthelmess, Anne Cornwall	Screenwriter
1922	Fascination	Metro	Mae Murray, Creighton Hale	Screenwriter
1922	Broadway Rose	Metro	Mae Murray, Monte Blue, Ward Crane	Screenwriter
1922	Heroes of the Street	Warner Bros.	Marie Prevost, Jack Mulhall	Screenwriter
1923	Fury	First National	Richard Barthelmess, Dorothy Gish	Screenwriter
1923	Dark Secrets	Paramount	Dorothy Dalton, Robert Ellis	Screenwriter
1923	Bright Lights of Broadway	Independent	Doris Kenyon, Harrison Ford, Edmund Breese, Lowell Sherman	Screenwriter
1923	Jazzmania	Metro	Mae Murray, Rod La Rocque, Jean Hersholt	Screenwriter
1923	Tiger Rose	Warner Bros.	Lenore Ulric, Forrest Stanley, Theodore von Eltz	Screenwriter
1923	The Bright Shawl	First National	Richard Barthelmess, Dorothy Gish, Jean Hersholt	Screenwriter
1924	The Man Who Came Back	Fox Film	George O'Brien, Dorothy Mackaill	Screenwriter
1924	Dante's Inferno	Fox Film	Pauline Starke, Ralph Lewis	Screenwriter
1924	Gerald Cranston's Lady	Fox Film	Alma Rubens, Walter McGrail	Screenwriter
1925	The Dancers	Fox Film	George O'Brien, Alma Rubens	Screenwriter
1925	The Scarlet Honeymoon	Fox Film	Shirley Mason, Pierre Gendron	Screenwriter
1925	The Fool	Fox Film	Edmund Lowe, Raymond Bloomer	Screenwriter
1925	Havoc	Fox Film	Madge Bellamy, George O'Brien, Walter McGrail	Screenwriter
1925	Sun-Up	MGM	Lucille La Verne, Conrad Nagel, Pauline Starke	Director, screenwriter
1925	The Beautiful City	First National	Richard Barthelmess, Dorothy Gish, William Powell	Screenwriter
1925	Sally, Irene and Mary	MGM	Constance Bennett, Joan Crawford, Sally O'Neil	Director, screenwriter
1926	Dancing Mothers	Paramount Pictures	Conway Tearle, Alice Joyce, Clara Bow	Based on one of his plays
1926	Paris	MGM	Charles Ray, Joan Crawford, Rose Dione	Director, screenwriter
1927	Women Love Diamonds	MGM	Pauline Starke, Owen Moore, Lionel Barrymore	Director, screenwriter
1927	Love	MGM	John Gilbert, Greta Garbo	Director, producer
1928	A Certain Young Man	MGM	Ramón Novarro / Marceline Day	Uncredited Director. Lost film.
1928	Happiness Ahead	First National	Colleen Moore, Edmund Lowe	Screenwriter
1928	A Lady of Chance	MGM	Norma Shearer, Lowell Sherman	Screenwriter
1929	Queen Kelly	United Artists	Gloria Swanson, Walter Byron	Hired by Swanson to help complete and edit the film
Sound films
1929	The Trespasser	United Artists	Gloria Swanson, Robert Ames	Director, screenwriter
1929	The Broadway Melody	MGM	Anita Page, Bessie Love	Screenwriter
1930	Paramount on Parade	Paramount Pictures	Paramount Star Revue	A musical revue using 11 directors and starring various Paramount stars / Some Technicolor sequences
1930	The Devil's Holiday	Paramount Pictures	Nancy Carroll, Phillips Holmes	Director, screenwriter
1930	Hell's Angels	The Caddo Company	Ben Lyon, James Hall, Jean Harlow	Hired by Howard Hughes to direct the silent scenes used in the final film
1930	Reaching for the Moon	United Artists	Douglas Fairbanks, Bebe Daniels	Director, screenwriter
1930	The Grand Parade	Pathé Exchange	Helen Twelvetrees, Richard Carle	Screenwriter, producer
1931	The Night Angel	Paramount Pictures	Fredric March, Nancy Carroll	Director, screenwriter
1932	Grand Hotel	MGM	Greta Garbo, John Barrymore, Joan Crawford	Director, winner of the Academy Award for Best Picture
1932	Flesh	MGM	Wallace Beery, Ricardo Cortez, Karen Morley	Screenwriter
1932	No Man of Her Own	MGM	Clark Gable, Carole Lombard, Dorothy Mackaill	Screenwriter
1932	Blondie of the Follies	MGM	Marion Davies, Robert Montgomery, Billie Dove	Director
1934	Riptide	MGM	Norma Shearer, Robert Montgomery, Herbert Marshall	Director, screenwriter
1934	Hollywood Party	MGM	Hollywood Revue	In an attempt to salvage the film, MGM producer Harry Rapf hired Goulding and eight other directors to direct sequences for the film.
1935	The Flame Within	MGM	Maureen O'Sullivan, Ann Harding, Herbert Marshall	Director, screenwriter, producer
1935	A Night at the Opera	MGM	Marx Brothers	Directed a few scenes
1937	That Certain Woman	Warner Bros., First National Pictures	Bette Davis, Henry Fonda	Director, screenwriter
1938	White Banners	Warner Bros., Cosmopolitan Pictures	Fay Bainter, Claude Rains, Jackie Cooper	Director
1938	The Dawn Patrol	Warner Bros.	Errol Flynn, Basil Rathbone, David Niven	Director
1939	Dark Victory	Warner Bros., First National Pictures	Bette Davis, George Brent, Humphrey Bogart	Director
1939	The Old Maid	Warner Bros.	Bette Davis, Miriam Hopkins, George Brent	Director
1939	We Are Not Alone	Warner Bros., First National Pictures	Paul Muni, Jane Bryan	Director
1940	'Til We Meet Again	Warner Bros.	Merle Oberon, George Brent	Director. Goulding shot 70% of the film around bouts of pneumonia.
1940	Two Girls on Broadway	MGM	Lana Turner, Joan Blondell	Screenplay
1941	The Great Lie	Warner Bros.	Bette Davis, George Brent, Mary Astor	Director
1943	Forever and a Day	RKO Radio Pictures	Ensemble cast	Director, producer. Goulding directed a segment for the film.
1943	Old Acquaintance	Warner Bros.	Bette Davis, Miriam Hopkins	Screenwriter
1943	The Constant Nymph	Warner Bros.	Charles Boyer, Joan Fontaine, Alexis Smith	Director
1943	Claudia	20th Century Fox	Dorothy McGuire, Robert Young	Director
1944	Of Human Bondage	Warner Bros.	Paul Henreid, Eleanor Parker	Director
1945	Flight from Folly	Warner Bros.	Pat Kirkwood, Tamara Desni	Screenwriter
1946	The Razor's Edge	20th Century Fox	Tyrone Power, Gene Tierney, John Payne	Director
1947	The Shocking Miss Pilgrim	20th Century Fox	Betty Grable, Dick Haymes	Director. Goulding filled in for George Seaton while he was ill during production / Technicolor film
1947	Nightmare Alley	20th Century Fox	Tyrone Power, Joan Blondell, Coleen Gray	Director
1949	Everybody Does It	20th Century Fox	Paul Douglas, Linda Darnell, Celeste Holm	Director
1950	Mister 880	20th Century Fox	Burt Lancaster, Dorothy McGuire, Edmund Gwenn	Director
1952	We're Not Married!	20th Century Fox	Ensemble cast	Director
1953	Down Among the Sheltering Palms	20th Century Fox	William Lundigan, Mitzi Gaynor, Jane Greer	Director. Technicolor film.
1956	Teenage Rebel	20th Century Fox	Ginger Rogers, Betty Lou Keim	Director, screenwriter
1958	Mardi Gras	20th Century Fox	Pat Boone, Christine Carère	Director
