= Diana Miller =

American actress

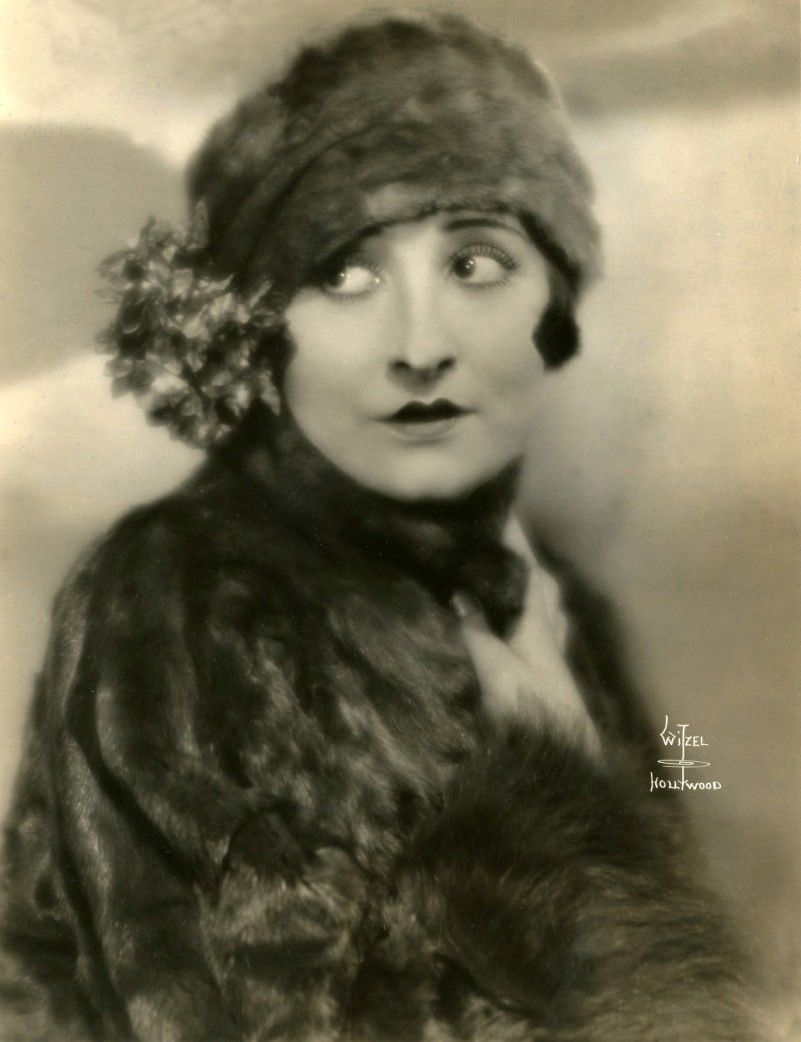
- Miller ca. 1924
- Born: March 18, 1902; Seattle, Washington
- Died: December 18, 1927 (aged 25); Monrovia, California
- Occupation: Actress
- Years active: 1924–1926
- Spouse: George Melford

Diana Miller (March 18, 1902 – December 18, 1927) was an American actress in silent motion pictures. She had red hair and excelled in playing roles which required delineation of character. She was briefly married to director and producer George Melford.

== Career ==
Born in Seattle, Washington, Miller entered movies with assistance from actor Wallace Reid. She worked for five years for Famous Players–Lasky before she lost her job and rebounded with the Fox Film Company. She was almost penniless and took work as an extra. By 1925 Miller had worked in nine Fox films.

Miller's first performance was in Honor Among Men (1924). She played the role of Celeste in She Wolves (1925) before making The Kiss Barrier (1925), which featured Edmund Lowe. Her final film roles came in the mid-1920s in The Fighting Heart (1925), When The Door Opened (1925), and The Cowboy and the Countess (1926).

== Personal life ==
Miller was married to actor and director George Melford. She suffered a breakdown about a year before her death and was treated at a sanatorium.

== Death ==
Miller died at the age of 25 in 1927 at the Pottinger Sanatorium in Monrovia, California. The cause of death was pulmonary hemorrhage.

== Filmography ==
Year	Title	Role	Notes
1924	Honor Among Men	Countess Zara De Winter	Lost film
1924	Flames of Desire	Marion Vavasour	Lost film
1924	Curlytop	Bessie	Lost film
1925	The Hunted Woman	Marie	Lost film
1925	She Wolves	Céleste	Lost film
1925	The Rainbow Trail	Anne	
1925	The Kiss Barrier	Suzette	Lost film
1925	Every Man's Wife	Emily	Lost film
1925	All Abroad	Gaby Renee	Lost film
1925	The Fighting Heart	Helen Van Allen	Alternative title: Once to Every Man; Lost film
1925	When the Door Opened	Siren	Lost film
1926	The Cowboy and the Countess	Nanette	Lost film
