= Happiness Ahead =

Happiness Ahead may refer to:

- Happiness Ahead (1934 film), an American comedy film
- Happiness Ahead (1928 film), a silent film drama
