= Virginia Marshall =

American actress

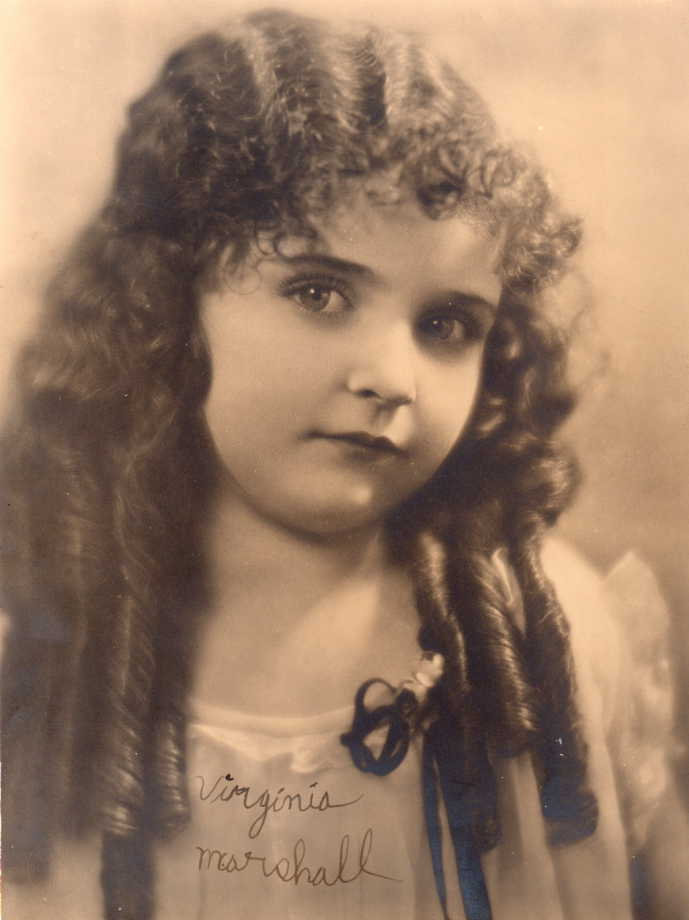
- Born: October 1, 1918; Dallas, Texas. U.S.
- Died: January 30, 1982 (aged 63); Hemet, California, U.S.
- Spouse(s): Ray G. Montgomery, Jr.

Virginia Elizabeth Marshall (October 1, 1918 – January 30, 1982), also known as Little Virginia Marshall, was an American child actress in the silent film era between 1924 and 1930.

== Biography ==
Virginia Elizabeth Marshall was born on October 1, 1918, in Dallas, Texas, to Virginia G. Wallace of Cuba, Missouri, and Wallace L. Marshall of Tyler, Texas.

Marshall appeared in a Los Angeles Times feature entitled Stars Tomorrow? in April 1925. She was among a group of children that included Vonda Phelps and Virginia Davis. The article questioned whether their stardom would continue or fade away with time. In fact the nine youth performers profiled only remained popular with theatre and film audiences for a brief time, Marshall's motion picture career lasted from 1924 through 1930.

She performed in thirteen screenplays. The films include comedy shorts like Little Robinson Corkscrew (1924), the melodrama, East Lynne (1925), and the western, The Arizona Wildcat (1927). Marshall was given the opportunity to act with many stars of her era, such as Tom Mix, Alma Rubens, Edmund Lowe, and Dorothy Revier.

Around 1940 she married Ray G. Montgomery, Jr. (1913 – 1995) of Denver, Colorado.

Marshall died on January 30, 1982, in Hemet, California, at the age of 63.

== Partial filmography ==
- Romance of the Wasteland (1924)
- The Only Woman (1924)
- Daddy's Gone A-Hunting (1925)
- An Enemy Of Men (1925)
- Sweet Marie (1925)
- Lazybones (1925)
- East Lynne (1925)
- Rose of the World (1925)
- My Own Pal (1926)
- The Test of Donald Norton (1926)
- Silence (1926)
- Flesh and the Devil (1927)
- Outlaws of Red River (1927)
- The Arizona Wildcat (1927)
- The Younger Generation (1929)
