= Chivalrous Charley =

1921 film

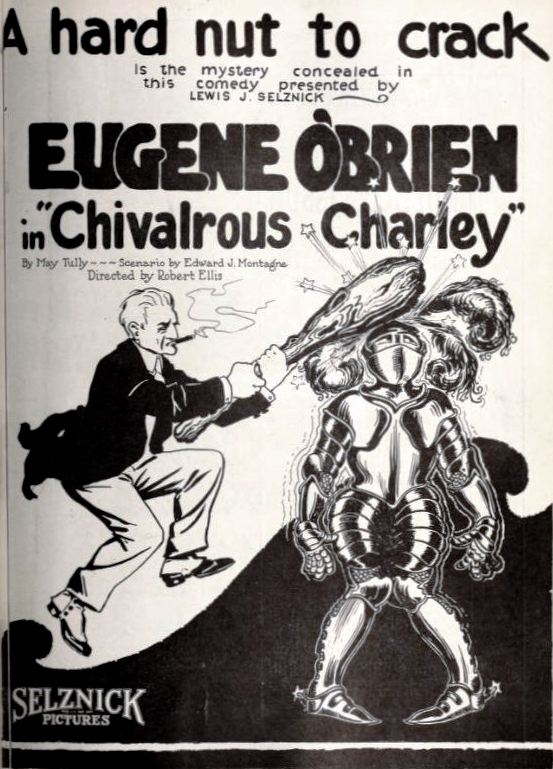
- Directed by: Robert Ellis
- Written by: Edward J. Montagne; May Tully
- Starring: Eugene O'Brien; George Fawcett; Nancy Deaver
- Cinematography: Jules Cronjager
- Production company: Selznick Pictures
- Distributed by: Select Pictures
- Release date: December 10, 1921
- Country: United States
- Languages: Silent; English intertitles

Chivalrous Charley is a 1921 American silent comedy film directed by Robert Ellis and starring Eugene O'Brien, George Fawcett and Nancy Deaver.

== Cast ==
- Eugene O'Brien as Charles Riley
- George Fawcett as His Uncle
- Nancy Deaver as Alice Sanderson
- D.J. Flanagan as Her Father
- Huntley Gordon as Geoffrey Small

== Bibliography ==
- Munden, Kenneth White. The American Film Institute Catalog of Motion Pictures Produced in the United States, Part 1. University of California Press, 1997.
