= Honor Among Men =

1924 film

- Directed by: Denison Clift
- Written by: Denison Clift; Richard Harding Davis (novel The King's Jackal)
- Starring: Edmund Lowe; Claire Adams; Sheldon Lewis
- Cinematography: G.O. Post
- Production company: Fox Film Corporation
- Distributed by: Fox Film Corporation
- Release date: September 8, 1924
- Country: United States
- Languages: Silent; English intertitles

Honor Among Men is a lost 1924 American silent film directed by Denison Clift and starring Edmund Lowe, Claire Adams and Sheldon Lewis.

== Cast ==
- Edmund Lowe as Prince Kaloney
- Claire Adams as Patricia Carson
- Sheldon Lewis as King Louis
- Diana Miller as Countess Zara De Winter
- Frank Leigh as Renauld
- Fred Becker as Col. Erhaupt
- Paul Weigel as Baron Barrat
- Hector V. Sarno as Nichols
- Fred Malatesta as Count De Winter
- Walter Wilkinson as Little Crown Prince

== Bibliography ==
- Solomon, Aubrey. The Fox Film Corporation, 1915-1935. A History and Filmography. McFarland & Co, 2011.
