= High Voltage (1929 film) =

1929 film

- PLAY full film (63 minutes).
- Directed by: Howard Higgin
- Written by: James Gleason; Kenyon Nicholson
- Produced by: Ralph Block
- Starring: William Boyd; Carole Lombard; Owen Moore; Phillips Smalley; Billy Bevan
- Cinematography: John J. Mescall
- Edited by: Doane Harrison
- Music by: Josiah Zuro
- Production company: Pathé Exchange
- Distributed by: Pathé Exchange
- Release date: June 29, 1929
- Running time: 63 minutes
- Country: United States
- Language: English

High Voltage is a 1929 American pre-Code drama film directed by Howard Higgin and produced by Pathé Exchange. The film stars William Boyd, Diane Ellis, Owen Moore, Phillips Smalley, Billy Bevan, and Carole Lombard in her feature-length "talkie" debut, billed as "Carol Lombard."

== Plot ==
The film begins with a bus driving along a snow-covered roadway in the Sierra Nevada between Nevada City, California, and Reno, Nevada. Soon the vehicle gets hopelessly stuck in deep snow forty miles from the nearest town. Needing shelter, the driver "Gus" and his four passengers find refuge in an isolated one-room log church. The passengers include "Billie", who is an escaped criminal being escorted back to jail in New York by a deputy sheriff, "Dan Egan"; a young woman, "The Kid," on her way to Chicago to meet her boyfriend; and "Hickerson," a pompous, ill-tempered banker. In the church the group finds "Bill", a self-described "hobo," who had found shelter there earlier. Tensions quickly arise in the group over their general plight, petty jealousies, and concerns about how six people are going to share the small supply of food that Bill had brought with him.

After a few days being stranded, the group sees a passing mail plane high in the sky. They try to attract the pilot's attention, but he is too far away to see them. More days pass, and the group continues to ration their dwindling supplies and battle the subfreezing temperatures. To keep warm they begin to break up the church's pews and other furnishings to use as firewood in the room's potbelly stove. The group's desperation intensifies, as does a romance between Bill and Billie. Soon Bill confides to her that he too is a wanted criminal, a fugitive from Saint Paul, Minnesota. As conditions worsen, The Kid collapses from hunger and become delirious; and the church's interior becomes almost bare as more furnishings—even the church's pulpit and pump organ—are consigned to the stove. Bill and Billie finally commit to leaving to avoid being imprisoned if the group is somehow rescued. They quietly depart during the night, hoping to reach a ranger station ten miles away. Everyone else is sleeping except Dan, the deputy sheriff, who sees the two leaving; but he does nothing to stop them. After walking a short distance through snowdrifts, Bill and Billie hear and then see a search plane slowly circling overhead at low altitude. Realizing that the others inside the church will not hear the plane's engine, they rush back and awaken them. The group hurriedly builds a signal fire, which the plane's pilot sees. He parachutes a box of provisions to them with a note saying that help will be sent immediately.

The next day the group sees a rescue party heading toward the church. While awaiting their rescuers, Dan observes Bill and Billie sitting together on the floor. From his coat pocket Dan pulls out Billie's extradition papers and a "wanted" notice that includes a photograph of Bill and information about his being a fugitive from Saint Paul. Dan walks over to the stove, now cold from no fires, and tosses both papers into it. Bill and Billie see him discard the papers, and they look at one another. Bill then gets up, retrieves the papers from the stove, gives them back to Dan, and asks him to drop him off in Saint Paul on his way back to New York with Billie.

== Cast ==
- William Boyd as "The Boy" (Bill)
- "Carol" Lombard as "The Girl" (Billie Davis)
- Owen Moore as "The Detective" (Dan Egan)
- Phillips Smalley as "The Banker" (J. Milton Hendrickson)
- Billy Bevan as "The Driver" (Gus)
- Diane Ellis as "The Kid"

== Music ==
The soundtrack features a song entitled "Colleen O' Kildare" which was composed by George Green and George Waggner for the film. The song is sung by Owen Moore in the film.

=== Cast notes ===
- The opening credits of High Voltage give Carole Lombard's first name as "Carol," her preferred spelling for her name up until that time. However, the year after the release of High Voltage she performed in Paramount Pictures' production Fast and Loose. In her credits for that film, the studio mistakenly added an "e" to Carol. Lombard liked the spelling, so she decided to keep "Carole" permanently as her screen name.

== Reception ==
In July 1929, the entertainment trade paper The Film Daily gave a generally positive review to the "All-Talker Version" of High Voltage, as well as high marks to William Boyd's performance. With regard to "Carol Lombard", the New York publication identifies her only in the film's cast listing; it never refers to her by name within the body of its review, just as either "the blonde prisoner" or "the girl":

This makes a fairly entertaining all-talker, with some nicely handled dramatic scenes that build good suspense and hold the interest. William Boyd has a pleasing voice, and manages to make his part very realistic and convincing. Most of the action takes place in a mountain cabin in the Sierras, where a busload of people have been stranded in a snowstorm. The peculiar mixture of the group develops the drama. There is a deputy sheriff with a blonde prisoner, a banker, a bride-to-be, and the stage driver ... Love develops between the stranger and the blonde prisoner. The stranger discloses to the girl that he is also wanted by the police. Works up to novel rescue by [airplane]. Has thrills.

== See also ==
- List of early sound feature films (1926–1929)
