= Dangerous Toys (film) =

1921 film

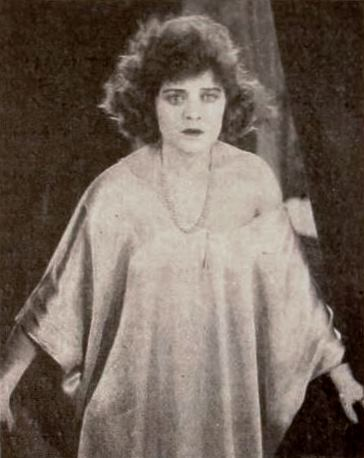
- Marguerite Clayton in the film
- Directed by: Samuel R. Brodsky (as Samuel R. Bradley)
- Written by: Edmund Goulding
- Starring: Frank Losee; Marion Elmore; Marguerite Clayton
- Cinematography: Harry W. Gerstad
- Edited by: J.J. Kiley
- Production company: Bradley Feature Film Company
- Distributed by: Federated Film Exchanges of America
- Release date: 8 February 1921
- Country: United States
- Languages: Silent; English intertitles

Dangerous Toys is a 1921 American silent film directed by Samuel R. Brodsky (as Samuel R. Bradley) and starring Frank Losee, Marion Elmore and Marguerite Clayton. One of six features directed by Brodsky, it was filmed at his Cleveland studio at the Samuel Andrews mansion on Euclid Avenue. It is considered to be a lost film.

== Cast ==
- Frank Losee as Hugo Harman
- Marion Elmore as Mrs. Hugo Harman
- Marguerite Clayton as Louise Malone
- William Desmond as Jack Gray
- Frances Devereaux as Mrs. Malone
- Lillian Greene as Phyllis Harman
