= Diane Ellis =

American actress

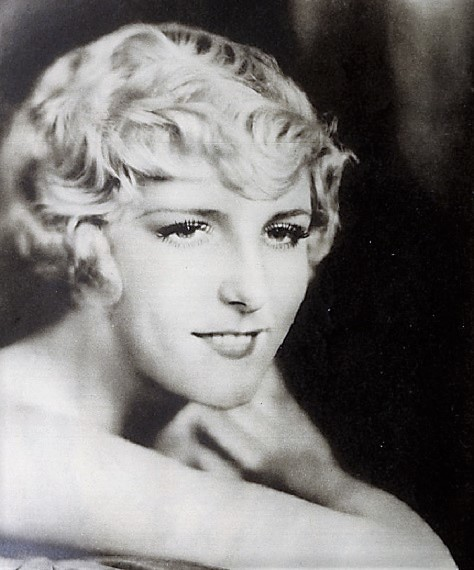
- From a 1929 magazine
- Born: December 20, 1909; Los Angeles, California, U.S.
- Died: December 15, 1930 (aged 20); Madras, British India
- Education: Fairfax High School
- Occupation: Actress
- Years active: 1927–1930
- Known for: Laughter

Diane Ellis (December 20, 1909 – December 15, 1930) was an American actress.

== Biography ==
A native of Los Angeles and the only child of Frank Ellis and Ida Peterson, Diane Ellis graduated from Fairfax High School, then worked as a secretary for the Film Research Bureau before making her movie debut for Fox Film Corporation, credited as Dione Ellis, in Is Zat So?.

The performance was followed the same year by a co-starring role opposite Louise Fazenda in Cradle Snatchers. Ellis then played the romantic lead in a Western opposite Buck Jones in Chain Lightning (1927); and after appearing in four other films, she was cast in a supporting role in Happiness Ahead (1928), a high-profile release that starred the popular actresses Colleen Moore and Lilyan Tashman.

Ellis's next-to-last film, High Voltage (1929), was a box-office success and was her first full talking picture. That film is also notable as Carole Lombard's first "talkie" as well. Ellis's final acting appearance was in Laughter (1930), which was the biggest role of her career, featuring her in a romantic triangle along with Fredric March and Nancy Carroll. Laughter won critical acclaim, and March later cited it as one of his favorites films.

On October 14, 1930, Ellis married Stephen Caldwell Millett Jr., in Paris, France. Just two months later, during the couple's extended honeymoon in India, she fell ill with an infection and died in Madras (now Chennai), 5 days before her 21st birthday. She was cremated there and her ashes brought back by Millett to his native England.

== Filmography ==
- Is Zat So? (1927)
- Cradle Snatchers (1927)
- Paid to Love (1927)
- Chain Lightning (1927)
- Hook and Ladder No. 9 (1927)
- Love is Blonde (1928)
- Happiness Ahead (1928)
- The Leatherneck (1929)
- High Voltage (1929)
- Laughter (1930)
