= The Test of Donald Norton =

1926 film

- Lobby card
- Directed by: B. Reeves Eason
- Written by: Robert E. Pickerton (novel The Test of Donald Norton); Adele Buffington (scenario)
- Produced by: I. E. Chadwick
- Starring: George Walsh; Tyrone Power Sr.
- Cinematography: Arthur Reeves
- Distributed by: Chadwick Pictures (on State's Rights basis)
- Release date: March 1, 1926
- Running time: 68 minutes
- Country: United States
- Languages: Silent; English intertitles

The Test of Donald Norton is a 1926 American silent Western film starring George Walsh and Tyrone Power Sr. and directed by B. Reeves Eason.

== Synopsis ==
Donald Norton, a man of mixed race, grew up under the care of the Layards. He becomes the manager of a fur trading post for Hudson's Bay Company but has some struggles when he goes to be reassigned. Donald becomes ill one winter and his post manager, Dale Millington, takes advantage of his absence to impugn Donald's loyalty to the company. Donald is fired by his district manager, John Corrigal. In an argument with Corrigal, Donald becomes convinced that Corrigal is his father.

After taking a post in a rival company, Donald hears his mother has almost choked to death. Both he and Corrigal rush to her side, but she dies before she can clear up the paternity mystery. Millington abducts the Layards' daughter and Donald's love, Janet, but Donald brings them back to the post. Millington tells the story that he heard from Donald's mother. She had burned down Corrigal's house and taken his son, John Corrigal, Jr. Corrigal hugs his son, Donald, and his soon to be daughter-in-law, Janet.

== Cast ==
- George Walsh - Wen-dah-ben, aka Donald Norton
- Tyrone Power Sr. - John Corrigal
- Robert Graves - Dale Millington
- Eugenia Gilbert - Lorraine
- Evelyn Selbie - Nee-tah-wee-gan
- Michael D. Moore - Wendahban, as a boy
- Virginia True Boardman
- John Francis Dillon
- Virginia Marshall

== Production ==
The Test of Donald Horton was partially shot on location at Truckee, California.

== Preservation ==
A complete copy is held by the Library of Congress in Washington, D.C.
