= The Kiss Barrier =

1925 film

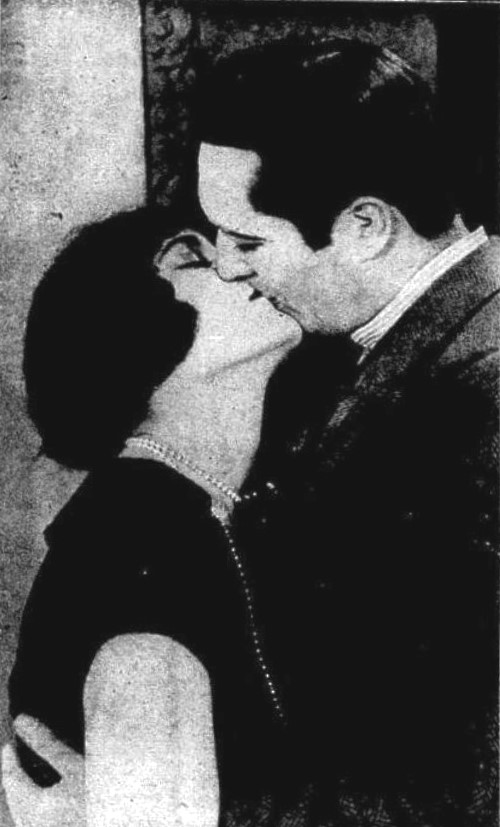
- Film still
- Directed by: Roy William Neill
- Screenplay by: Eugenie Magnus Ingleton
- Story by: Frederic Hatton; Fanny Hatton
- Starring: Edmund Lowe; Claire Adams; Diana Miller
- Production company: Fox Film Corporation
- Distributed by: Fox Film Corporation
- Release date: May 31, 1925
- Running time: 60 minutes
- Country: United States
- Language: Silent (English intertitles)

The Kiss Barrier is a lost 1925 American silent drama film directed by Roy William Neill and written by Eugenie Magnus Ingleton. The film stars Edmund Lowe, Claire Adams, Diana Miller, Marion Harlan, Thomas R. Mills, and Charles Clary. The film was released on May 31, 1925, by Fox Film Corporation.

== Plot ==
As described in a film magazine review, during the war, aviator Richard March downs one German airplane but another one gets his machine. Ambulance driver Marion Weston sees the aircraft fall and, driving to the crash site, finds March is unhurt. While heading back to their lines, March kisses Marion and she is indignant, although he apologizes. After the war ends, March returns to the United States and resumes his profession of acting. Colonel Hale, a war friend, invites March to a skating party where he once again sees Marion, but she snubs him. Later, Connie Hale comes to March's apartment, and he succeeds in getting Marion to soften her attitude toward him. She misunderstands a situation between his leading lady Suzette and him, causing her to again turn against him. This attitude continues until March gives a play based upon his war experiences in France, and this convinces Marion that she misjudged him. Connie, jealous, goes to March and attempts to compromise herself. She makes a scene, and her father denounces March, who keeps silent to protect Connie's reputation, and she confesses the truth. In the meantime, Marion realizes that she loves March and, even thinking that he has disgraced himself, tells him that she wants to go away with him and be his wife.

== Cast ==
- Edmund Lowe as Richard March
- Claire Adams as Marion Weston
- Diana Miller as Suzette
- Marion Harlan as Connie Hale
- Thomas R. Mills as O'Hara
- Charles Clary as Col. Hale
- Grace Cunard as Widow
- Virginia Madison as Mrs. Hale

== Preservation ==
With no prints of The Kiss Barrier located in any film archives, it is a lost film.
