= Sealed Hearts =

1919 American silent drama film directed by Ralph Ince

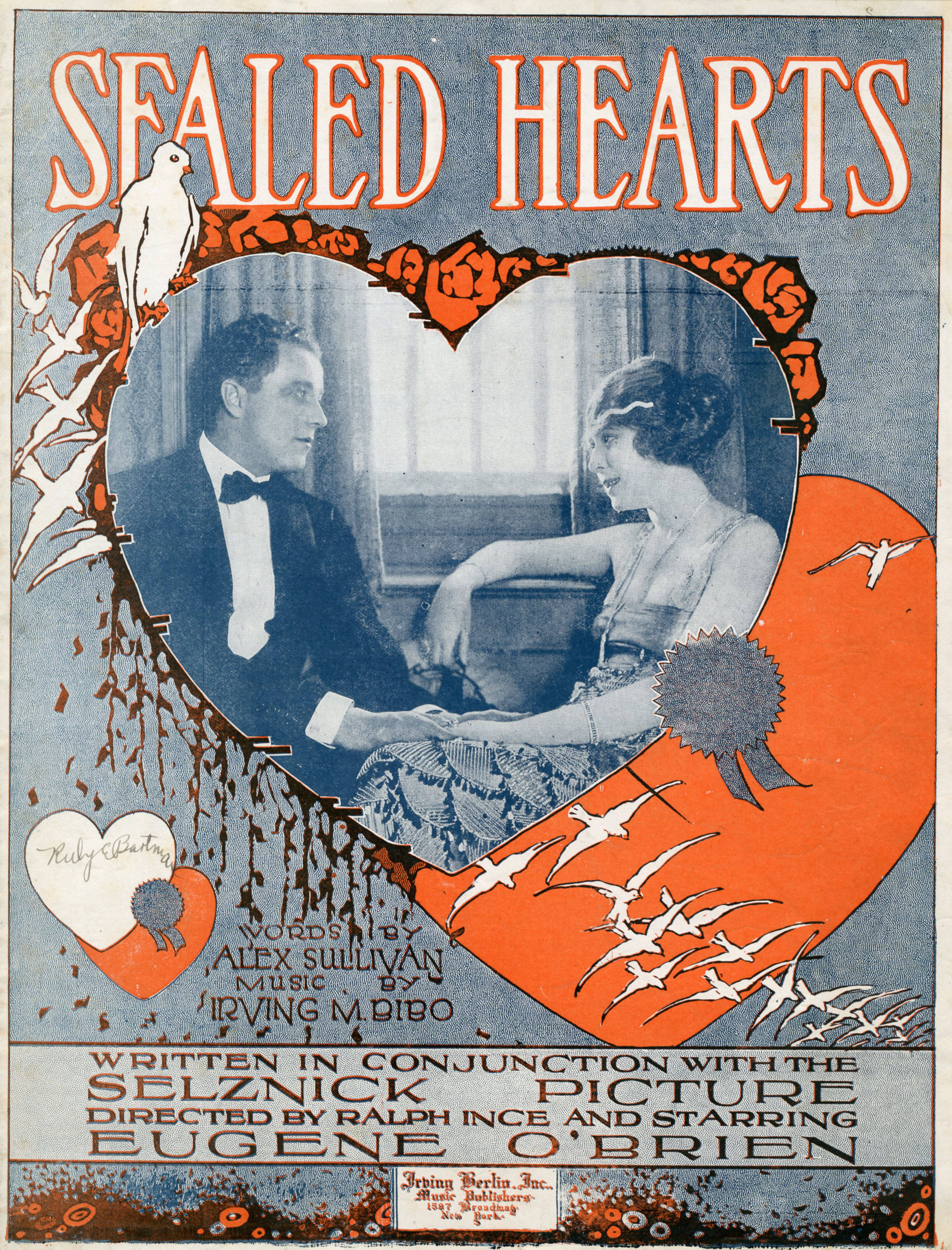
- Still on sheet music cover with O'Brien and Stewart
- Directed by: Ralph Ince
- Written by: Edmund Goulding; R. Cecil Smith; Eugene Walter
- Produced by: Lewis J. Selznick
- Starring: Eugene O'Brien; Robert Edeson; Lucille Lee Stewart
- Production company: Selznick Pictures
- Distributed by: Select Pictures
- Release date: November 16, 1919
- Running time: 50 minutes
- Country: United States
- Language: Silent (English intertitles)

Sealed Hearts is a 1919 American silent drama film directed by Ralph Ince and starring Eugene O'Brien, Robert Edeson, and Lucille Lee Stewart. The previously lost film was rediscovered in the United Kingdom after a film collector provided his copy to the De Montfort University’s Cinema and Television History Institute. However, the final fifth reel is still missing.

== Plot ==
Frank Prentiss, a multi-millionaire who hates and distrusts women, convinces his adopted son, Jack, that they are detrimental to a man's success. The overworked Frank is forced to rest at the country home of his friend, Mr. Gray, where he meets and falls in love with the host's daughter, Kate. She refuses his proposal at first, but later accepts because her father, who has two younger children, is experiencing financial difficulties. Following the wedding, Kate is subjected to Frank's verbal abuse and seeks solace with Jack. Their friendship enrages Frank, who tortures them with his accusations. During a dinner party, Frank accuses Jack and Kate of being lovers in front of the male guests. Jack is restrained from accosting his father, but Frank suffers a fatal heart attack. Later, Jack and Kate fall in love and are married.

== Cast ==
- Eugene O'Brien as Jack Prentiss
- Robert Edeson as Frank Prentiss
- Lucille Lee Stewart as Kate Gray
- Jack Dean as Mr. Gray
- Ethel Kingsley as Mrs. Gray
- Frank Murdock as Fred Gray
- Helen Reinecke as Helen Gray
- William T. Hayes

== Bibliography ==
- Monaco, James. The Encyclopedia of Film. Perigee Books, 1991.
