= The Fool (1925 film) =

1925 film

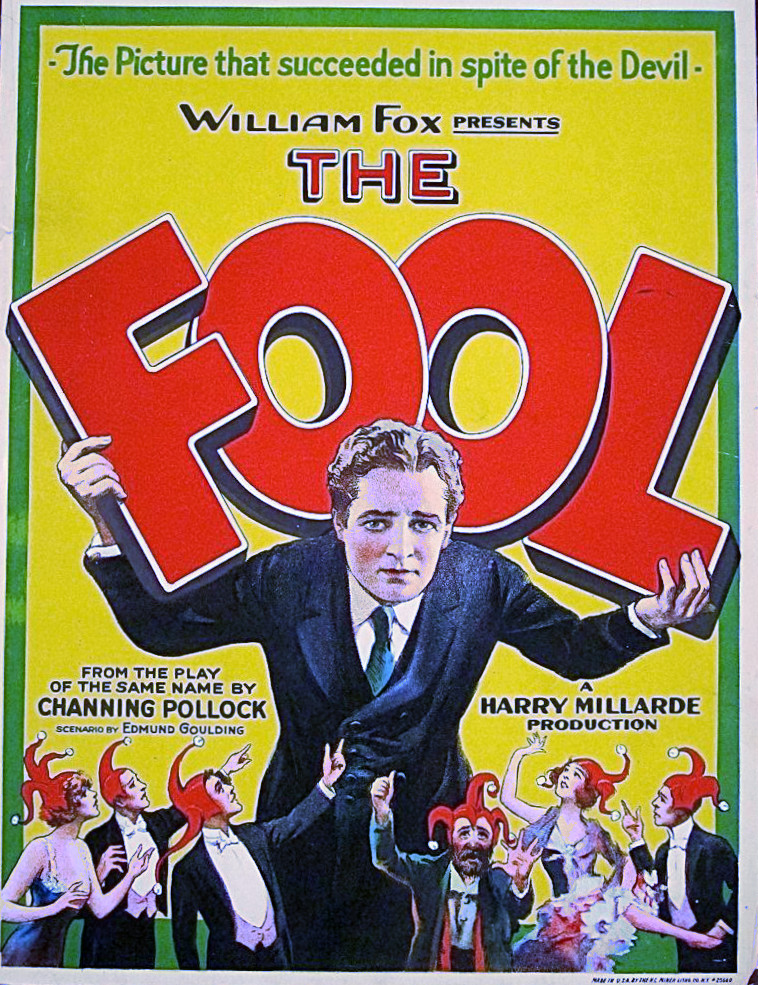
- Lobby poster
- Directed by: Harry Millarde
- Written by: Edmund Goulding
- Based on: The Fool by Channing Pollock
- Produced by: William Fox
- Starring: Edmund Lowe
- Cinematography: Joseph Ruttenberg
- Production company: Fox Film
- Distributed by: Fox Film
- Release date: November 15, 1925
- Running time: 10 reels
- Country: United States
- Language: Silent (English intertitles)

The Fool is a lost 1925 American silent drama film directed by Harry Millarde. It is based on the 1922 play The Fool by Channing Pollock.

== Plot ==
As described in a film magazine review, the Rector of a wealthy church loses the sympathy and support of parishioners when he preaches the doctrine of Christ to sacrifice worldly goods. He establishes a mission among the lower classes and, although he is beaten for his efforts, he gains happiness by doing good.

== Cast ==
- Edmund Lowe as Daniel Gilchirst
- Raymond Bloomer as Jerry
- Henry Sedley as Stedman
- Paul Panzer as Umanski
- A. J. Herbert as Hennig
- Downing Clarke as Rev. Everett Wadham
- George Lessey as Goodkind
- Blanche Craig as Mrs. Henry Gilliam
- Fred C. Jones as Poor Man
- Rose Blossom as Dilly Gilliam
- Anne Dale as Mary Margaret
- Helena D'Algy as Mrs. Thornbury
- Mary Thurman as Pearl
- Lucille Lee Stewart as Society Lady
- Brenda Bond as Clare

== Preservation ==
With no prints of The Fool located in any film archives, it is a lost film.

== See also ==
- 1937 Fox vault fire
