= Channing of the Northwest =

1922 film by Ralph Ince

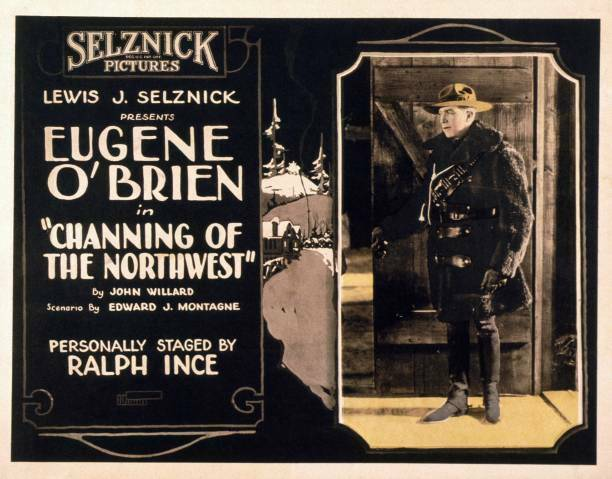
- Directed by: Ralph Ince
- Written by: Edward J. Montagne; John Willard
- Produced by: Lewis J. Selznick
- Starring: Eugene O'Brien; Gladden James; Norma Shearer
- Cinematography: John W. Brown
- Production company: Selznick Pictures Corporation
- Distributed by: Select Pictures
- Release date: April 20, 1922
- Running time: 5 reels
- Country: United States
- Language: Silent (English intertitles)

Channing of the Northwest is a 1922 American silent drama film directed by Ralph Ince and starring Eugene O'Brien, Gladden James and Norma Shearer.

== Plot ==
As described in a film magazine, Channing (O'Brien), a member of the Northwest Mounted Police and known to his fellows as "the Duke," is sent to a town to watch a gang of outlaws that have crossed the border from the United States and are suspected in the shooting of a Northwest Mounted Policeman. He meets Cicily Varden (Naldi) who is engaged to a youth living with the family. This young man has fallen in with the gang at McCook's saloon, and in an altercation shoots a man. The young woman attempts to hide him when Channing enters the cabin. Because her fiancé has broken his promise not to go to McCook's, she breaks her engagement with him and declares her love for Channing. This meets with the approval of her father when he learns of the circumstances. The film is noted as having several flashbacks regarding Channing's life in England prior to enlisting in the Northwest Mounted.

== Cast ==
- Eugene O'Brien as Channing
- Gladden James as Jim Franey
- Norma Shearer as Jess Driscoll
- James Seeley as Tom Driscoll
- Pat Hartigan as Sport McCool
- Nita Naldi as Cicily Varden
- Harry Lee as McCool's man
- Jack W. Johnston as Buddy
- C. Coulter as Channing's Uncle

== Bibliography ==
- Jack Jacobs & Myron Braum. The films of Norma Shearer. A. S. Barnes, 1976.
