= East Lynne (1925 film) =

1925 film

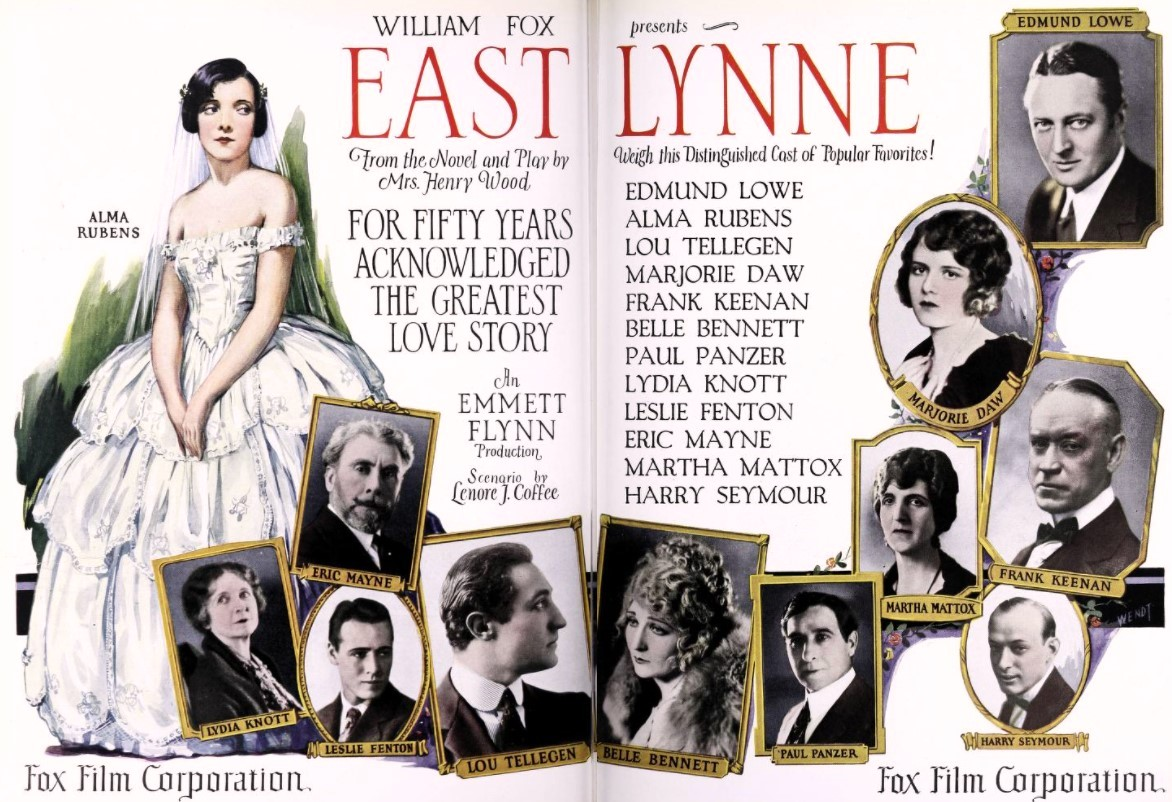
- Advertisement
- Directed by: Emmett J. Flynn
- Written by: Lenore Coffee (scenario); Emmett J. Flynn (scenario)
- Based on: East Lynne by Ellen Wood
- Starring: Alma Rubens; Edmund Lowe; Lou Tellegen
- Cinematography: Ernest G. Palmer
- Distributed by: Fox Film Corporation
- Release date: November 23, 1925
- Running time: 9 reels (8,975 feet)
- Country: United States
- Language: Silent (English intertitles)
- Box office: $1.1 million

East Lynne is a 1925 American silent drama film directed by Emmett J. Flynn and starring Alma Rubens, Edmund Lowe, and Lou Tellegen. The film is based on the bestselling 1861 Victorian novel of the same name by Ellen Wood. The scenario was written by Lenore Coffee and the film's director, Emmett J. Flynn.

Distributed by Fox Film Corporation, the film was a hit for the studio grossing $1.1 million.

== Plot ==
As described in a review in a film magazine, Carlyle (Lowe), a wealthy young Englishman buys a debt-ridden estate from Lord Mount-Severn (Mayne) and persuade his daughter, Lady Isabel (Rubens), to marry him though she loves the rascally Sir Francis (Tellegen). Years pass, and this pair are blessed with two little kiddies. A villager, the father of a wayward girl, is murdered and Richard (Fenton), the brother of Carlyle's former sweetheart Barbara (Daw), is accused. Barbara makes an appointment with Carlyle to ask his help. Lady Isabel, misunderstanding, leaves her kiddies and goes with Sir Francis, who ill-treats her and finally casts her off. Returning to England, she gets in a wreck and is reported dead. Carlyle eventually marries Barbara. Lady Isabel learns that her oldest child is ill and, posing as a nurse, goes to him and nurses him to health. Then she becomes ill and dies, happy in the thought she has saved her child's life and that Carlyle, who had recognized her, will keep her secret.

== Cast ==
- Alma Rubens as Lady Isabel
- Edmund Lowe as Archibald Carlyle
- Lou Tellegen as Sir Francis Levison
- Belle Bennett as Afy Hallijohn
- Marjorie Daw as Barbara Hare
- Leslie Fenton as Richard Hare
- Richard Headrick as Willie Carlyle
- Frank Keenan as Justice Hare
- Lydia Knott as Mrs. Hare
- Virginia Marshall as Little Isabel
- Eric Mayne as Earl of Mount-Severn
- Martha Mattox as Cornelia Carlyle
- Paul Panzer as Mr. Hallijohn
- Harry Seymour as Mr. Dill
- Gus Leonard as Violinist (uncredited)

== Preservation ==
A complete print of East Lynne is located in the Museum of Modern Art collection.
