= My Own Pal =

1926 film

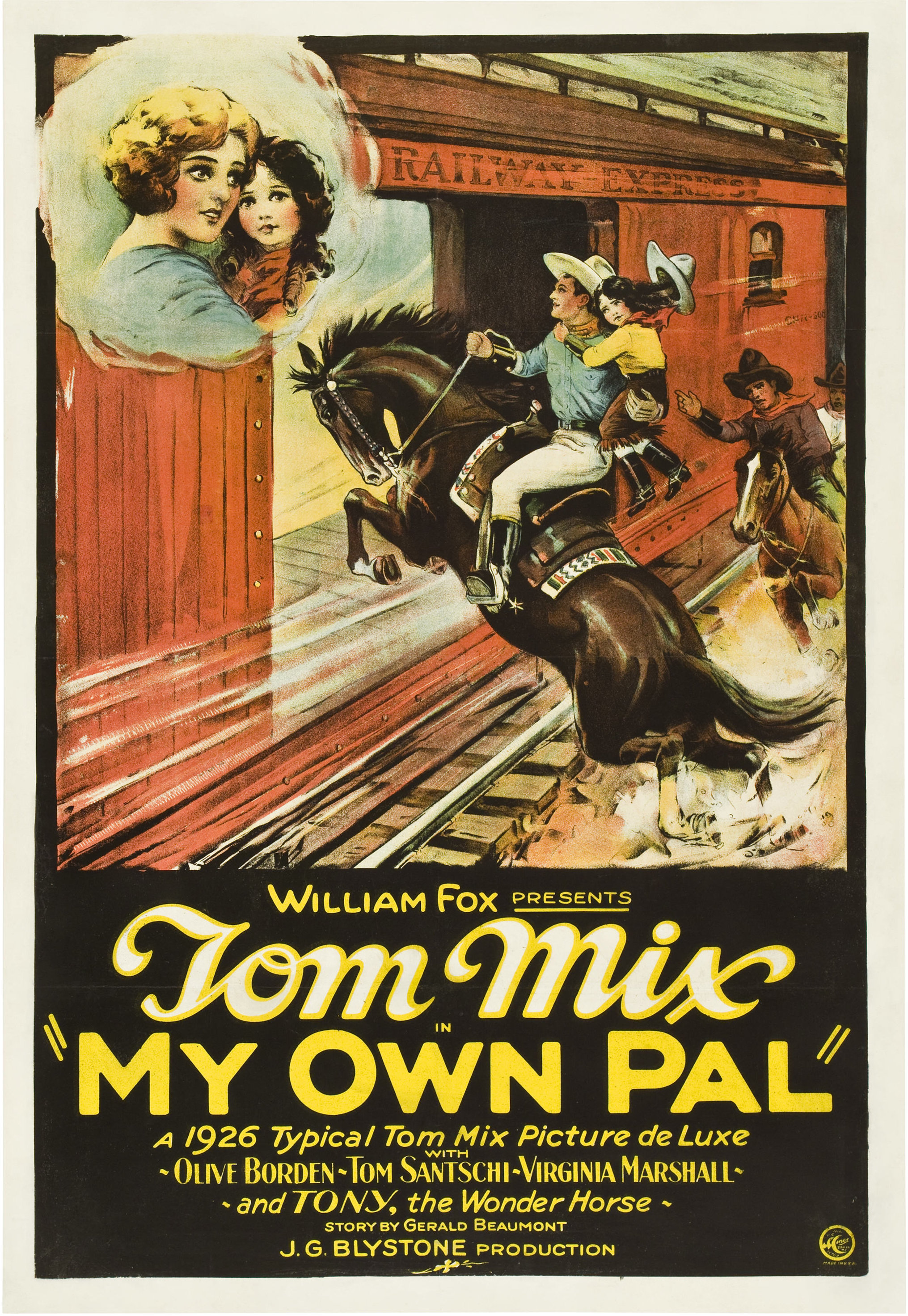
- Theatrical release poster
- Directed by: John G. Blystone
- Screenplay by: Lillie Hayward
- Starring: Tom Mix; Olive Borden; Tom Santschi; Virginia Marshall; Ben Bard; William Colvin
- Cinematography: Daniel B. Clark
- Production company: Fox Film Corporation
- Distributed by: Fox Film Corporation
- Release date: February 28, 1926
- Running time: 60 minutes
- Country: United States
- Language: Silent (English intertitles)

My Own Pal is a 1926 American silent Western film directed by John G. Blystone and written by Lillie Hayward. The film stars Tom Mix, Olive Borden, Tom Santschi, Virginia Marshall, Ben Bard, and William Colvin. The film was released on February 28, 1926, by Fox Film Corporation.

== Plot ==
As described in a film magazine review, Tom O'Hara, a young rancher, adopts Jill, a child of the circus, and takes her to a city. There he becomes a hero through the rescue of the police chief's daughter Alice Deering in a runaway automobile. The chief makes him a motorcycle policeman. In this capacity he captures a gang of desperadoes and, after a period of courtship, weds the chief's daughter.

== Cast ==
- Tom Mix as Tom O'Hara
- Olive Borden as Alice Deering
- Tom Santschi as August Deering
- Virginia Marshall as Jill
- Ben Bard as Baxter Barton
- William Colvin as Jud McIntire
- Virginia Warwick as Molly
- Jay Hunt as Clown
- Hedda Nova as Mrs. Jud McIntire
- Tom McGuire as Pat McQuire
- Helen Lynch as Trixie Tremaine
- Jack Rollens as Slippery Sam

== Preservation ==
With no prints of My Own Pal located in any film archives, it is a lost film.

== See also ==
- 1937 Fox vault fire
- Tom Mix filmography
