= The Only Woman =

1924 film by Sidney Olcott

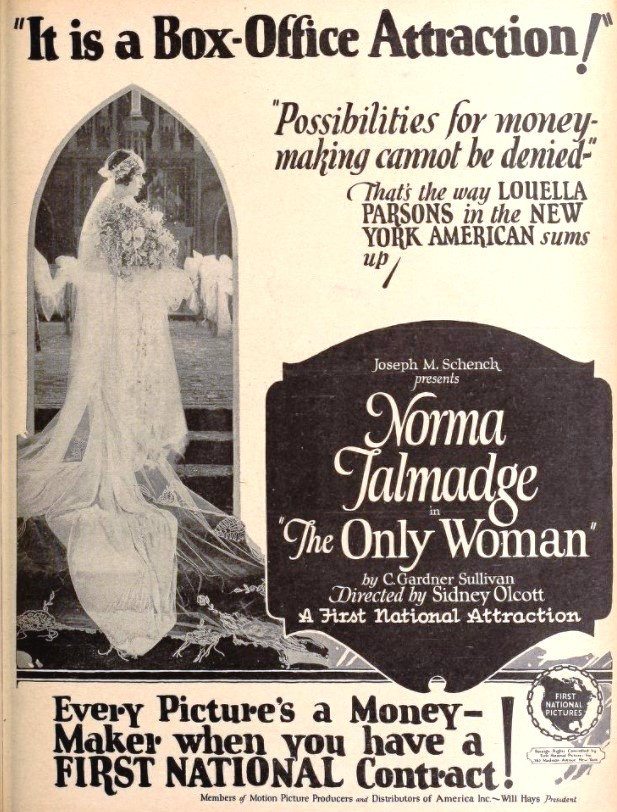
- Advertisement
- Directed by: Sidney Olcott
- Written by: C. Gardner Sullivan
- Produced by: Joseph M. Schenck
- Starring: Norma Talmadge
- Cinematography: Tony Gaudio
- Production company: Norma Talmadge Film Corporation
- Distributed by: First National
- Release date: October 26, 1924
- Running time: 7 reels, 6,670 feet
- Country: United States
- Language: Silent (English intertitles)

The Only Woman is a 1924 American silent drama film produced by Joseph M. Schenck for Norma Talmadge Productions and distributed by First National. It was directed by Sidney Olcott with Norma Talmadge as the leading woman.

== Plot ==
As described in a review in a film magazine, Fighting Jerry Herrington (Davis), a financial power, gets proof that William Brinsley (Hall) has speculated with trust funds and threatens to put him in jail unless Brinsley agrees to the marriage of his daughter Helen (Talmadge) to Herrington's son Rex (O'Brien), who is a drunkard. Herrington believes Helen is the only woman who can reform his son. Helen finally agrees and fulfills her contract to the letter. Herrington finally tells her that, when Rex returns to him sober and with a purpose, he will arrange a divorce. Helen starts to try to make a man of him. She takes him on a cruise and keeps liquor away from him. A storm comes up, there is a collision, all are lost but Helen, Rex, and Ole Hanson (Betz), a sailor who becomes officious. Ole later falls overboard in a fight with Rex. Finally they are rescued and return home. Rex offers to give Helen a divorce, but she tells him that she does not want one.

== Cast ==
- Norma Talmadge as Helen Brinsley
- Eugene O'Brien as Rex Harrington
- Edwards Davis as Fighting "Jerry" Harrington, Rex's Father
- Winter Hall as William Brinsley
- Matthew Betz as Ole Hansen
- E. H. Calvert as Rodnet Blake
- Stella Di Luni as Bing
- Murdock MacQuarrie as Yacht Captain
- Rev. Neal Dodd as Minister
- Brooks Benedict as First officer
- Charles O'Malley as Steward
- Virginia Marshall as Little girl

== Reception ==
Mordaunt Hall of The New York Times wrote, "Although the actual plot of Norma Talmadge's latest film vehicle. The Only Woman, is not unfamiliar, the story contains several interesting situations which are effectively pictured."

== Preservation status ==
A print of The Only Woman with some decomposition survives in the Library of Congress, National Audio-Visual Conservation Center collection.
