= Flames (1926 film) =

1926 film

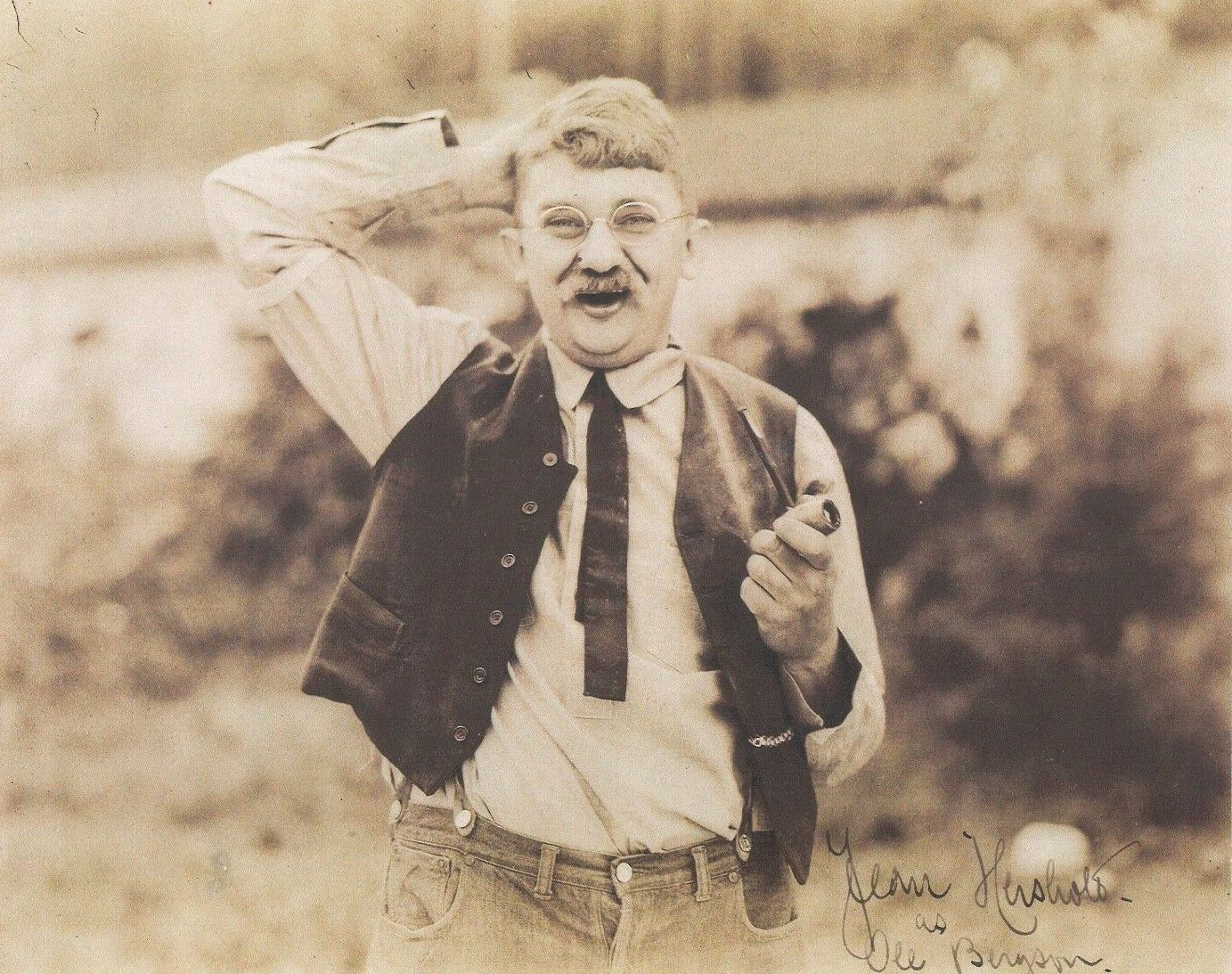
- Promotional photograph of actor Jean Hersholt in the film as Ole Bergson
- Directed by: Lewis H. Moomaw
- Screenplay by: Alfred A. Cohn
- Based on: To the Brave by Alfred A. Cohn
- Produced by: Lewis H. Moomaw
- Starring: Eugene O’Brien; Virginia Valli; Jean Hersholt; Boris Karloff
- Cinematography: Herbert H. Brownell; King D. Gray
- Edited by: Frank Lawrence
- Distributed by: Associated Exhibitors
- Release date: September 15, 1926
- Running time: 6 reels
- Country: United States
- Language: Silent (English intertitles)

Flames is a 1926 American silent drama film directed by Lewis H. Moomaw and starring Eugene O’Brien, Virginia Valli, Jean Hersholt, and Boris Karloff. Its plot follows a railroad laborer who, while working on a bridge in rural Oregon, must face off with a desperado who kidnaps his boss's daughter.

One reel of the feature survives at the Library of Congress, though the remaining five are lost. The film was shot on location in Portland, Oregon, as well as Oregon's Cascade Mountain range in the fall of 1925. Though mostly filmed in black and white, the film's climactic sequence, which features a forest fire, was shot in color.

== Plot ==
Herbert Landis is sent to supervise the construction of a bridge in Oregon by James Travers, a railroad magnate and father of Anne Travers, who Herbert is smitten by. Herbert is dismayed when Anne invites Hilary Fenton, high-society playboy, to accompany them to a rural encampment where the project is headquartered. Anne is attended by Mrs. Edgerton, who acts as a chaperone.

Herbert is dismayed by Anne's interest in Hilary, who is wooing her in an attempt to access her family's fortune. Ole Bergson, Herbert's cabin roommate, devises a plan to help make Anne fall in love with Herbert: Ole disguises himself as Blackie Blanchette, a local desperado, and kidnaps Anne, urging Herbert to "rescue" her from him.

Ole's plan is foiled when he himself is kidnapped by the real Blackie Blackfoot. When a forest fire breaks out in the area, Herbert confronts Blackie, who has brought Anne to a secluded cabin. Blackie is killed when the cabin catches fire, while Herbert and Anne manage to escape the blaze by seeking shelter in a river. The dramatic event leaves Hilary exasperated. Finding country life too difficult, he returns to the city. Upon Hilary's departure, Anne determines Herbert to be the true object of her affection.

== Cast ==
- Eugene O’Brien as Herbert Landis
- Virginia Valli as Anne Travers
- Jean Hersholt as Ole Bergson
- Bryant Washburn as Hilary Fenton
- Cissy Fitzgerald as Mrs. Edgerton
- George Nichols as James Travers
- Boris Karloff as Blackie Blanchette

== Production ==
The film was shot in Portland, Oregon in the fall of 1925 under the working title To the Brave, the name of the story by Alfred A. Cohn on which the film is based. It was subsequently retitled How to Train Your Wife before being retitled one final time as Flames, referring to a forest fire sequence that occurs at the climax of the film. The Forest Fire Protective Service oversaw the filming of the dramatic climactic sequence in Oregon's Cascade Range near Odell Lake in central Oregon. Though the majority of the film was shot in black and white, the climactic sequence was filmed in color.

== Release ==
Associated Exhibitors released Flames theatrically on September 15, 1926.

=== Critical response ===
A review published in The Pasadena Post noted that the film "was not so outstanding as to attract unusual attention, but the work of its three principal [actors] was." Roscoe McGowen of the New York Daily News wrote that the film was "not a bad picture," though he singled out Hersholt's performance as the standout, noting that he "contributes a Von Stroheim touch of realism."

== Availability ==
Flames is considered a lost film, although one of its six reels is known to survive, and is held by the Library of Congress.

== See also ==
- List of early color feature films

== Sources ==
- Nollen, Scott Allen; Nollen, Yuyun Yuningsih (2021). Karloff and the East: Asian, Indian, Middle Eastern and Oceanian Characters and Subjects in His Screen Career. Jefferson, North Carolina: McFarland. ISBN 978-1-476-64086-0.
