= Flames of Desire (film) =

1924 silent film by Denison Clift

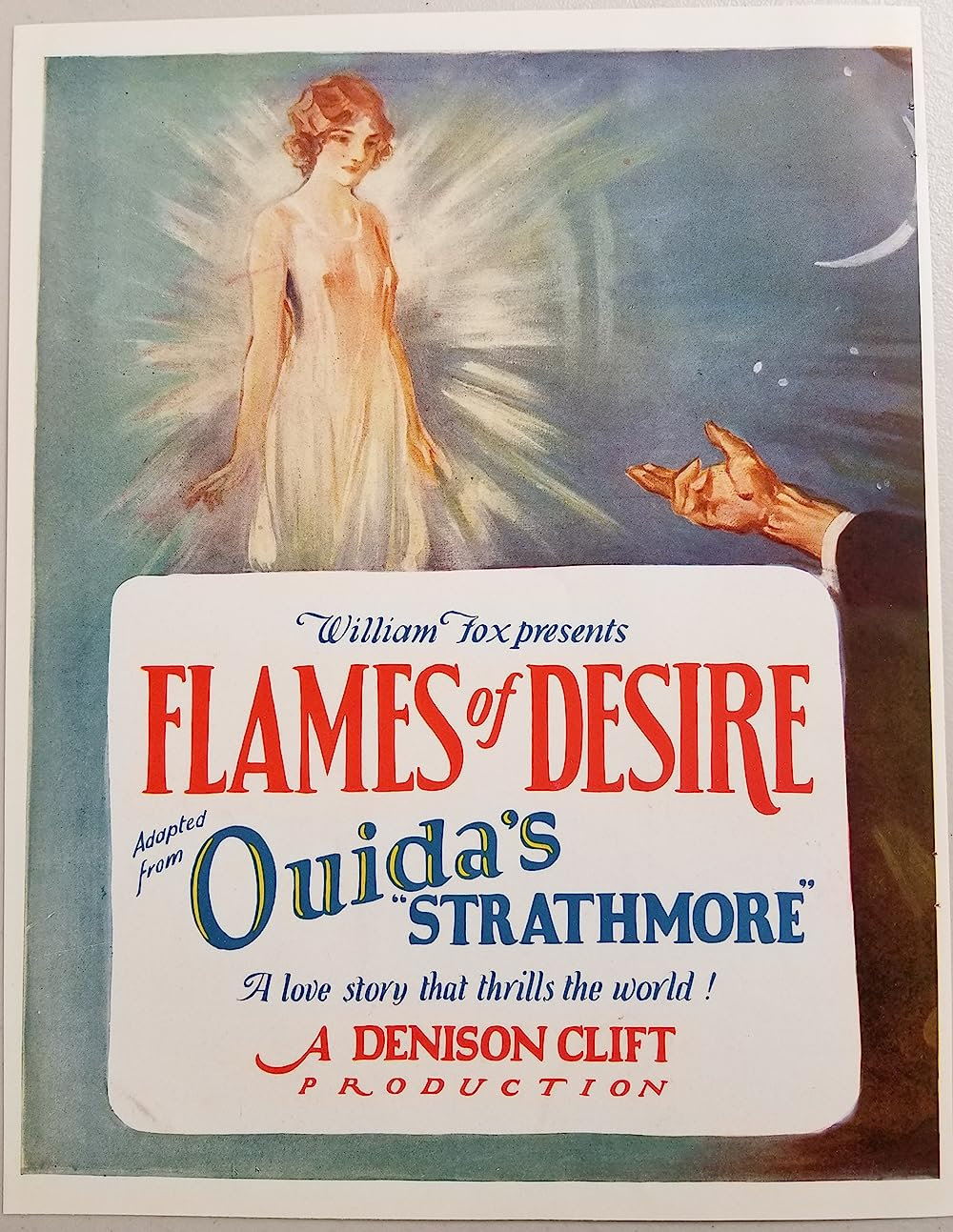
- Directed by: Denison Clift
- Written by: Denison Clift; Reginald Fogwell; Ouida (novel Strathmore)
- Starring: Wyndham Standing; Diana Miller; Richard Thorpe
- Cinematography: Ernest Palmer
- Production company: Fox Film Corporation
- Distributed by: Fox Film Corporation
- Release date: November 30, 1924
- Country: United States
- Languages: Silent; English intertitles

Flames of Desire is a 1924 American silent film directed by Denison Clift and starring Wyndham Standing, Diana Miller and Richard Thorpe.

== Cast ==
- Wyndham Standing as Daniel Strathmore
- Diana Miller as Marion Vavasour
- Richard Thorpe as Dick Langton
- Frank Leigh as Ferand Vavasour
- George K. Arthur as Lionel Caryll
- Jackie Saunders as Viola Lee
- Frances Beaumont as Lucille Errol
- Hayford Hobbs as Secretary
- Charles Clary as Clive Errol
- Eugenia Gilbert as Mrs. Courtney Ruhl

== Bibliography ==
- Solomon, Aubrey. The Fox Film Corporation, 1915-1935. A History and Filmography. McFarland & Co, 2011.
