= Chain Lightning (1927 film) =

1927 film

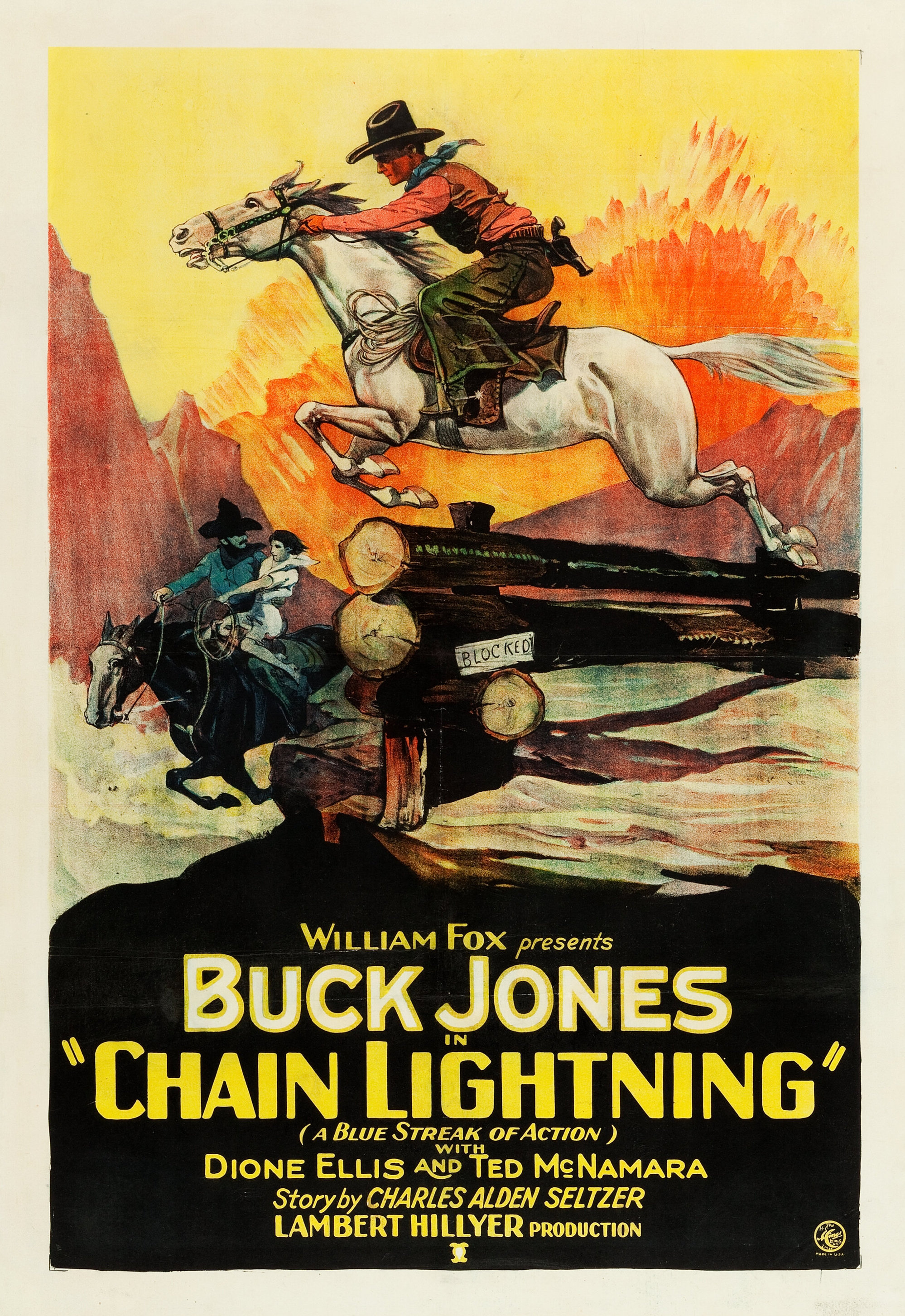
- Theatrical release poster
- Directed by: Lambert Hillyer
- Screenplay by: Lambert Hillyer
- Based on: Brass Commandments; 1923 novel by Charles Alden Seltzer
- Produced by: William Fox
- Starring: Buck Jones; Diane Ellis; Ted McNamara; Jack Baston; William Welsh; Martin Faust
- Cinematography: Reginald Lyons
- Edited by: Louis R. Loeffler
- Production company: Fox Film Corporation
- Distributed by: Fox Film Corporation
- Release date: August 14, 1927
- Running time: 60 minutes
- Country: United States
- Languages: Silent; English intertitles

Chain Lightning is a 1927 American silent Western film directed by Lambert Hillyer and written by Lambert Hillyer based upon the novel Brass Commandments by Malcolm Stuart Boylan. The film stars Buck Jones, Diane Ellis, Ted McNamara, Jack Baston, William Welsh, and Martin Faust. The film was released on August 14, 1927, by Fox Film Corporation. The novel that the film is based upon was previously filmed as Brass Commandments (1923).

== Cast ==
- Buck Jones as Steve Lannon
- Diane Ellis as Glory Jackson
- Ted McNamara as Shorty
- Jack Baston as Campan
- William Welsh as George Clearwater
- Martin Faust as Bannack
- William Caress as Tom Yeats
- Gene Cameron as Binghamwell Stokes Hurlbert
