= The Perfect Lover =

1919 film by Ralph Ince

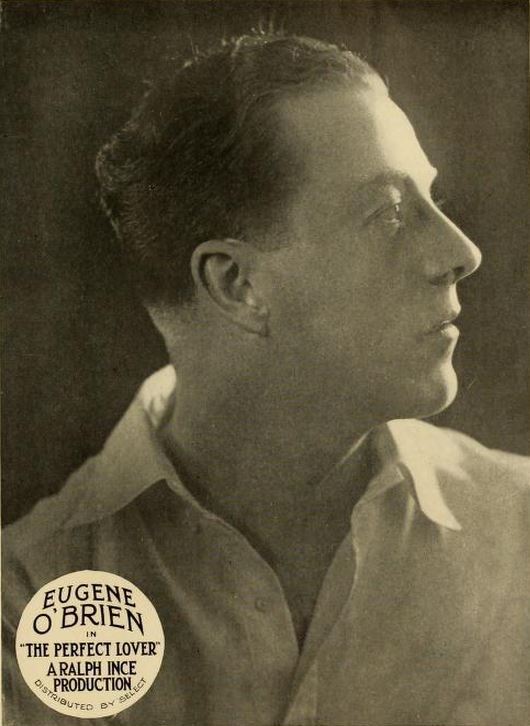
- Advertisement for film
- Directed by: Ralph Ince
- Written by: Edmund Goulding (scenario)
- Based on: "The Naked Truth" by Leila Burton Wells
- Produced by: Selznick Pictures Corporation
- Starring: Eugene O'Brien; Lucille Lee Stewart; Mary Boland
- Cinematography: William Brock
- Production company: Selznick Pictures
- Distributed by: Select Pictures Corporation
- Release date: September 20, 1919
- Running time: 5 reels
- Country: United States
- Language: Silent (English intertitles)

The Perfect Lover is a lost 1919 American silent drama film directed by Ralph Ince and starring Eugene O'Brien. It was produced and distributed by Selznick Pictures Corporation.

== Cast ==
- Eugene O'Brien as Brian Lazar
- Lucille Lee Stewart as Mrs. Byfield
- Marguerite Courtot as Eileen Hawthorn
- Mary Boland as Mrs. Whitney
- Martha Mansfield as Mavis Morgan
- Tom McRayne as Prof. Hawthorn
- Ann Brody (uncredited)
- Merceita Esmond (uncredited)
