= The Woman Gives =

1920 film directed by Roy William Neill

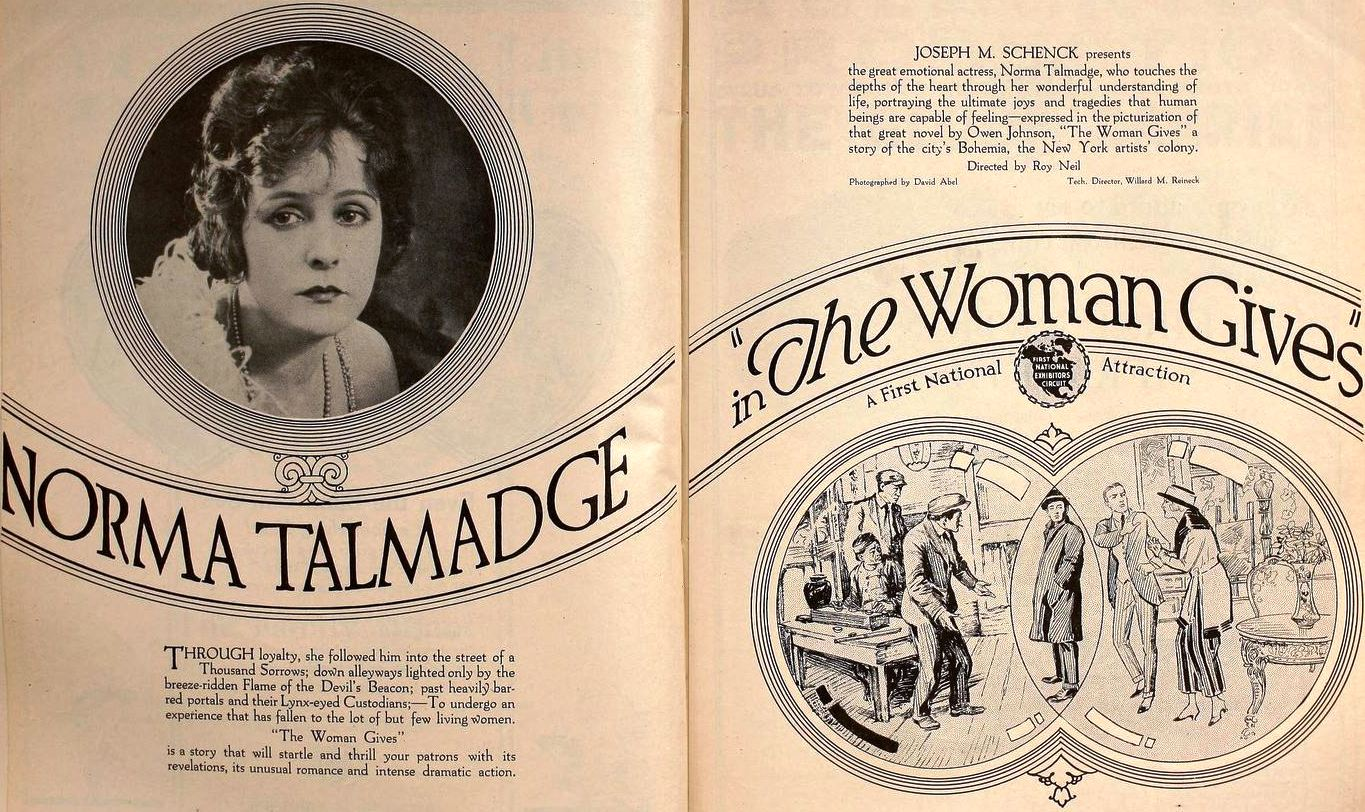
- Advertisement
- Directed by: Roy William Neill
- Written by: Grant Carpenter; Waldo Walker
- Based on: The Woman Gives by Owen Johnson
- Produced by: Joseph M. Schenck
- Starring: Norma Talmadge
- Cinematography: David Abel
- Production company: Norma Talmadge Film Corporation
- Distributed by: First National
- Release date: March 29, 1920
- Running time: 6 reels
- Country: United States
- Language: Silent (English intertitles)

The Woman Gives is a 1920 American silent drama film directed by Roy William Neill and starring Norma Talmadge, John Halliday, and Edmund Lowe.

== Plot ==
As described in a film magazine, artist Inga Sonderson and her betrothed sculptor Robert Milton owe their success to Daniel Garford, who is popularly acclaimed a genius. When Daniel discovers that his wife has been unfaithful, he abandons his career and drowns his sorrow in drink. Inga exerts every effort to save him from himself, much to her fiance's strenuous objections. She follows Daniel to an opium den and where he comes to a realization of his error. Robert breaks with Inga over her interest in Daniel. Daniel reclaims his popularity, and it is popularly assumed that he is to marry Inga, at the last minute she surprises everyone and marries Robert.

== Cast ==
- Norma Talmadge as Inga Sonderson
- John Halliday as Daniel Garford
- Edmund Lowe as Robert Milton
- Lucille Lee Stewart as Mrs. Garford
- John Smiley as Cornelius
- Edward Keppler as Bowden

== Preservation status ==
The film is preserved at the Library of Congress, Packard Campus for Audio-Visual Conservation, and the Russian Gosfilmofond.
