= Laughter (1930 film) =

1930 film

- Directed by: Harry d'Abbadie d'Arrast
- Written by: Harry d'Abbadie d'Arrast; Douglas Z. Doty (also story); Herman J. Mankiewicz; Donald Ogden Stewart
- Produced by: Monta Bell
- Starring: Nancy Carroll; Fredric March
- Cinematography: George J. Folsey
- Edited by: Helene Turner
- Music by: Vernon Duke (uncredited)
- Distributed by: Paramount Pictures
- Release date: September 25, 1930
- Running time: 85 minutes
- Country: United States
- Language: English

Laughter is a 1930 American pre-Code comedy film directed by Harry d'Abbadie d'Arrast and starring Nancy Carroll, Fredric March and Frank Morgan. It was shot at the Astoria Studios in New York.

The film was nominated for an Academy Award for Best Story.

Laughter was the final film of Diane Ellis, who died in December, 1930 at the age of 20, as the result of an infection while travelling in India on her honeymoon.

Fredric March later cited Laughter as one his favourites of his own films, and it was one of a few of which he retained a print.

A copy has been preserved at the Library of Congress.

In 1931, a German-language version called The Men Around Lucy was released starring Liane Haid and Lien Deyers. This film is considered lost.

== Plot ==
Peggy is a Follies dancer who forsakes her life of carefree attachments in order to meet her goal of marrying a millionaire. Alas, her elderly husband, broker C. Mortimer Gibson, is a well-meaning bore, and soon Peggy begins seeking entertainment elsewhere.

A year after their marriage, three significant events occur almost simultaneously. Peggy's former boyfriend, Paul Lockridge, a composer and pianist who is in love with her and seems to have a funny quip for every occasion, returns from Paris. She reunites with him as he offers her his companionship as a diversion from her stuffy life. Also, Ralph Le Saint, a young devil-may-care sculptor who is still in love with Peggy, plans his suicide in a mood of bitterness, and Gibson's daughter, Marjorie, returns from schooling abroad. Marjorie is soon paired with Ralph, and the romance that develops between them is paralleled by the adult affair between Peggy and Paul.

Ralph and Marjorie's escapades result in considerable trouble for Mortimer, while Paul implores Peggy to go to Paris with him, declaring "You are rich--dirty rich. You are dying. You need laughter to make you clean," but she refuses. When Marjorie plans to elope with Ralph, Peggy exposes the sculptor as a fortune hunter; and, dejected, he commits suicide. As a result, Peggy confesses her unhappiness to Gibson, then joins Paul and laughter in Paris.

== Cast ==
- Nancy Carroll as Peggy Gibson
- Fredric March as Paul Lockridge
- Frank Morgan as C. Mortimer Gibson
- Glenn Anders as Ralph Le Sainte
- Diane Ellis as Marjorie Gibson
- Ollie Burgoyne as Pearl, Peggy’s Maid
- Leonard Carey as Benham, Gibson’s butler
- Charles Halton as Winslow, Gibson’s secretary

== Reception ==
Contemporary reviews for Laughter were positive. Photoplay’s review stated, “Fredric March … does his best work … a first rater” and the The New York Times described the film as “clever nonsense” while praising Donald Ogden Stewart’s dialogue and the performances of March, Carroll and Morgan.

In 1998, Jonathan Rosenbaum of the Chicago Reader included the film in his unranked list of the best American films not included on the AFI Top 100.
