= Every Man's Wife =

1925 film

- Directed by: Maurice Elvey
- Screenplay by: Lillie Hayward
- Story by: Ethel Hill; Enid Hibbard
- Starring: Elaine Hammerstein; Herbert Rawlinson; Robert Cain; Diana Miller; Dorothy Phillips
- Cinematography: Faxon M. Dean
- Production company: Fox Film Corporation
- Distributed by: Fox Film Corporation
- Release date: June 7, 1925
- Running time: 50 minutes
- Country: United States
- Language: English

Every Man's Wife is a 1925 American romance and drama film directed by Maurice Elvey, and written by Lillie Hayward. The film stars Elaine Hammerstein, Herbert Rawlinson, Robert Cain, Diana Miller and Dorothy Phillips. The film was released on June 7, 1925, by Fox Film Corporation.

== Cast ==
- Elaine Hammerstein as Mrs. Randolph
- Herbert Rawlinson as Mr. Randolph
- Robert Cain as Mr. Bradin
- Diana Miller as Emily
- Dorothy Phillips as Mrs. Bradin
