= Lucille Lee Stewart =

American silent film actress (1889–1982)

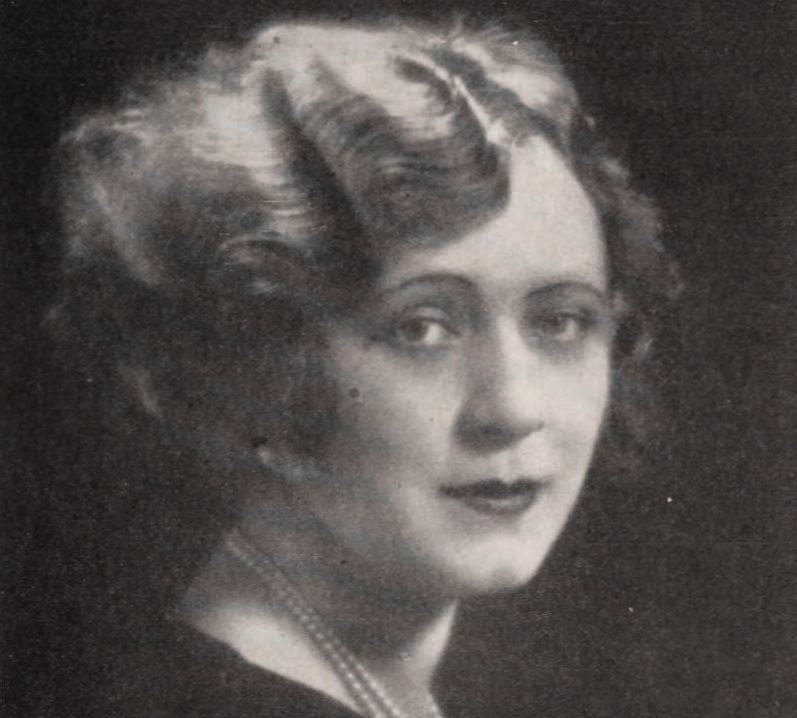
- Exhibitors Herald, 1921
- Born: December 25, 1889; Brooklyn, New York, U.S.
- Died: January 8, 1982 (aged 92); Hemet, California, U.S.
- Occupation: Actress
- Years active: 1910–1926 (film)
- Spouse: Ralph Ince (1910-1925, div.)
- Relatives: Anita Stewart (sister)

Lucille Lee Stewart (December 25, 1889 – January 8, 1982) was an American film actress of the silent era. Her screen career lasted between 1910 and 1926, during which time she played a mixture of lead and supporting roles.

== Life and career ==
The daughter of William H. and Martha Lee Stewart, Lucille Lee Stewart was born on December 25, 1889 in Brooklyn, New York. She was educated in public schools in Brooklyn.

Stewart worked in vaudeville before she began acting in films. Her early film work was in comedies for Vitagraph. Most of her roles were second leads, and her success dwindled in the 1920s. She "lived the remainder of her life in obscurity" after her 1925 divorce.

She was the elder sister of actress Anita Stewart. She was married to the actor and director Ralph Ince from 1910 to 1925 when they divorced.

Stewart's "debut as a leading player" in a film came in The Destroyers (1916).

Stewart died on January 8, 1982 in Hemet, California at the age of 92.

== Partial filmography ==
- Love in Quarantine (1910)
- The Conflict (1916)
- Our Mrs. McChesney (1918)
- The Eleventh Commandment (1918)
- Five Thousand an Hour (1918)
- Sealed Hearts (1919)
- The Perfect Lover (1919)
- A Woman's Business (1920)
- The Woman Gives (1920)
- The Fool (1925)
- Friendly Enemies (1925)
- Bad Company (1925)
- Fifth Avenue (1926)
- Sunshine of Paradise Alley (1926)

== Bibliography ==
- Billy H. Doyle. The Ultimate Directory of the Silent Screen Performers. Scarecrow Press, 1995.
