= Lazybones (1925 film) =

1925 film by Frank Borzage

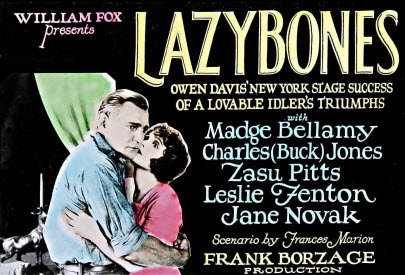
- Lantern slide
- Directed by: Frank Borzage
- Written by: Frances Marion
- Based on: Lazybones by Owen Davis
- Produced by: Frank Borzage
- Starring: Madge Bellamy; Buck Jones; ZaSu Pitts
- Cinematography: Glen MacWilliams; George Schneiderman
- Production company: Fox Film Corporation
- Distributed by: Fox Film Corporation
- Release date: November 6, 1925
- Running time: 8 reels
- Country: United States
- Language: Silent (English intertitles)

Lazybones is a 1925 American silent romantic drama film produced and directed by Frank Borzage and starring Madge Bellamy, Buck Jones, and ZaSu Pitts. It opened in New York City on September 22, 1924, and received wider distribution by Fox Film Corporation during 1925.

== Plot ==
Set in the early 20th century, the titular Lazybones, an indolent young man living with his indulgent mother, is in love with Agnes, a young woman from a wealthy family. Her sister, Ruth, summoned home to the village to be married advantageously, returns from two years at college with an unannounced infant. Afraid to tell her mother, she attempts suicide by jumping in the river, but Lazybones saves her and hears her story about secretly marrying a seaman who was lost at sea. Taking pity on Ruth, Lazybones looks after the infant, whom he names Kit, at first temporarily until Ruth can claim her, telling others that he found Kit and without revealing to anyone her mother' identity.

Agnes and Ruth's mother, when told by Ruth of the child, strikes Ruth and forbids her to acknowledge the child publicly, threatening to have it put into care if she does. Lazybones then adopts the child and refuses to reveal the mother, even though Agnes breaks off with him as a result. As the years pass, Ruth dies and Lazybones goes off to serve in World War I. When he returns a war hero, albeit underdeserved, he starts hoping to marry Kit now that she is an adult, he finds that she is in love with someone her own age.

== Cast ==
- Buck Jones as Steve Tuttle aka Lazybones (credited as Charles 'Buck' Jones)
- Edythe Chapman as Mrs. Tuttle
- Madge Bellamy as Kit
- ZaSu Pitts as Ruth Fanning
- Jane Novak as Agnes Fanning
- Emily Fitzroy as Mrs. Fanning
- Leslie Fenton as Dick Ritchie
- William Bailey as Elmer Ballister (credited as Wm. Norton Bailey)
- Virginia Marshall as Kit as a Young Girl

== Preservation ==
Prints held at Archives Du Film Du CNC (or Bois d'Arcy), Cinematheque Royale de Belgique, Brussels, the Museum of Modern Art, and the George Eastman Museum.
