= Eugene O'Brien (actor) =

American actor

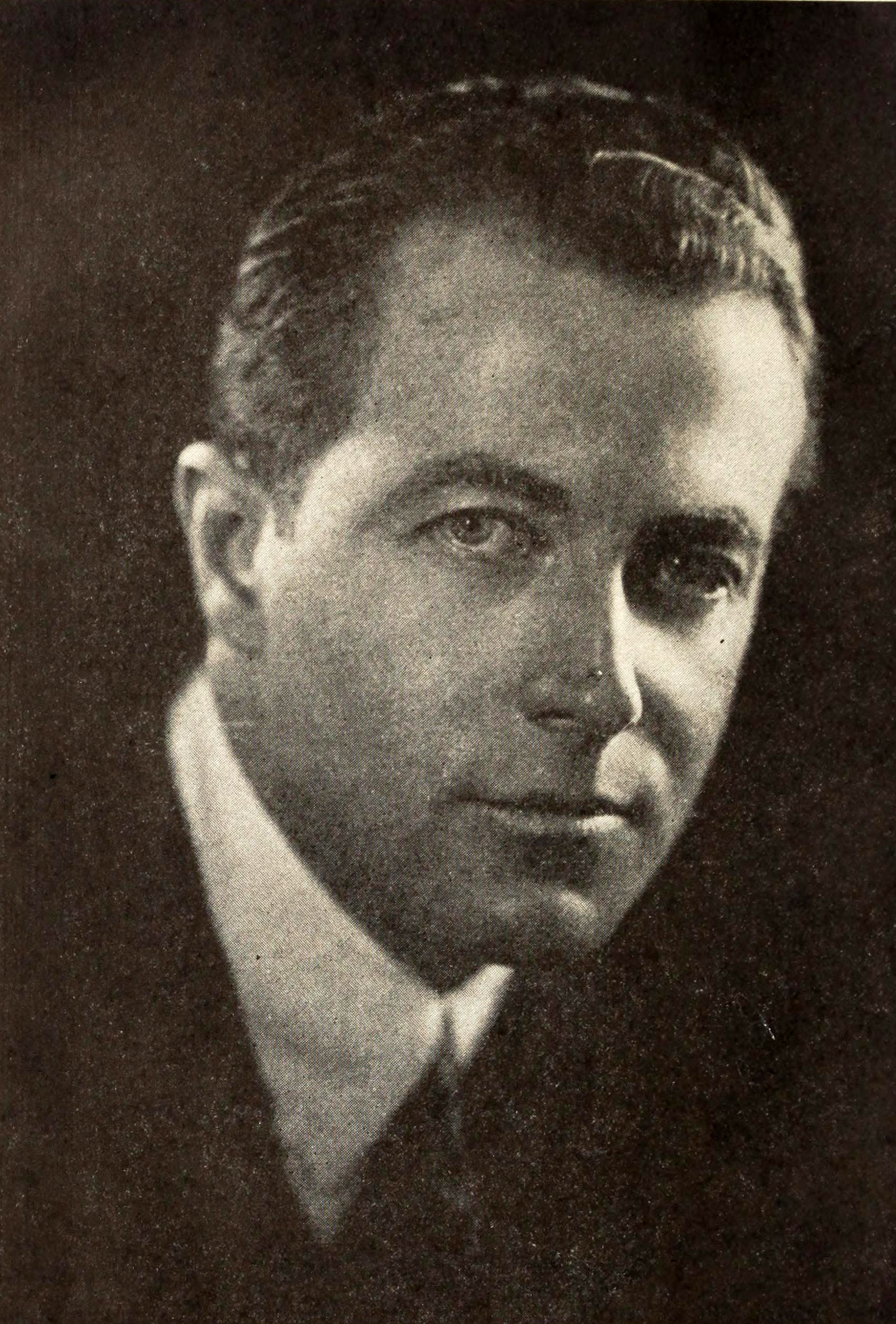
- O'Brien in 1920
- Born: Louis O'Brien; November 14, 1880; Boulder, Colorado, US
- Died: April 29, 1966 (aged 85); Los Angeles, California, US
- Education: University of Colorado Boulder
- Occupations: Stage, film actor
- Years active: 1908–1928

Eugene O'Brien (born Louis O'Brien; November 14, 1880 – April 29, 1966) was an American silent film star and stage actor.

== Biography ==
O'Brien was born on November 14, 1880, in Boulder, Colorado.

He studied medicine at the University of Colorado Boulder but was keener on the stage than becoming a doctor. O'Brien switched to civil engineering under his family's guidance, but his heart was still set on becoming an actor. He moved to New York City and was "discovered" by theatrical impresario Charles Frohman who signed O'Brien to a three-year contract and put him in The Builder of Bridges, which opened on Broadway at the Hudson Theatre on October 26, 1909, after he had appeared on Broadway in The Rollicking Girl (1905).

O'Brien made his name playing opposite Ethel Barrymore, in a revival of Sir Arthur Wing Pinero's play Trelawny of the 'Wells', which opened on New Year's Day, 1911, at the Empire Theatre.

O'Brien's other Broadway credits included The Country Cousin (1917), Her Husband's Wife (1917), The Angel in the House (1915), The Bargain (1915), A Celebrated Case (1915), The Money Makers (1914), A Woman Killed with Kindness / Granny Maumee (1914), Kitty Mackay (1914), Tainted Philanthropy (1912), The Case of Becky (1912), and The Million (1911).

O'Brien's first film, Essanay Film's The Lieutenant Governor, in which he had the starring role, played in Boulder's Curran Theater in February 1915, giving his family its first opportunity to see him act. World Film Corp. chief executive Lewis J. Selznick made O'Brien a screen star, putting him in an adaptation of Wilkie Collins' The Moonstone. Subsequently, he was leading man opposite some of the leading female stars of the day, including Mary Pickford, Norma Talmadge and Gloria Swanson and became a silent screen matinée idol.

He retired from acting when sound films came in, making his last film, Faithless Lover, in 1928 at age 47. He died on April 29, 1966, in Los Angeles, California. He is interred at Glendale's Forest Lawn Memorial Park.

== Legacy ==
For his contributions to the motion pictures industry, O'Brien received a star on the Hollywood Walk of Fame at 1620 Vine Street on February 8, 1960.

== Partial filmography ==
- The Scarlet Woman (1916)
- The Rise of Susan (1916)
- The Return of Eve (1916)
- Poppy (1917)
- The Moth (1917)
- The Ghosts of Yesterday (1918)
- By Right of Purchase (1918)
- De Luxe Annie (1918)
- The Safety Curtain (1918)
- Her Only Way (1918)
- Under the Greenwood Tree (1918)
- Come Out of the Kitchen (1919)
- Sealed Hearts (1919)
- The Broken Melody (1919)
- The Perfect Lover (1919)
- The Wonderful Chance (1920)
- His Wife's Money (1920)
- Broadway and Home (1920)
- The Figurehead (1920)
- A Fool and His Money (1920)
- Is Life Worth Living? (1921)
- Clay Dollars (1921)
- Chivalrous Charley (1921)
- The Last Door (1921)
- Channing of the Northwest (1922)
- The Prophet's Paradise (1922)
- John Smith (1922)
- The Voice from the Minaret (1923)
- Secrets (1924)
- The Only Woman (1924)
- Graustark (1925)
- Siege (1925)
- Souls for Sables (1925)
- Fine Manners (1926)
- Flames (1926)
- The Romantic Age (1927)
- Faithless Lover (1928)
