= Happiness Ahead (1928 film) =

1928 film directed by William A. Seiter

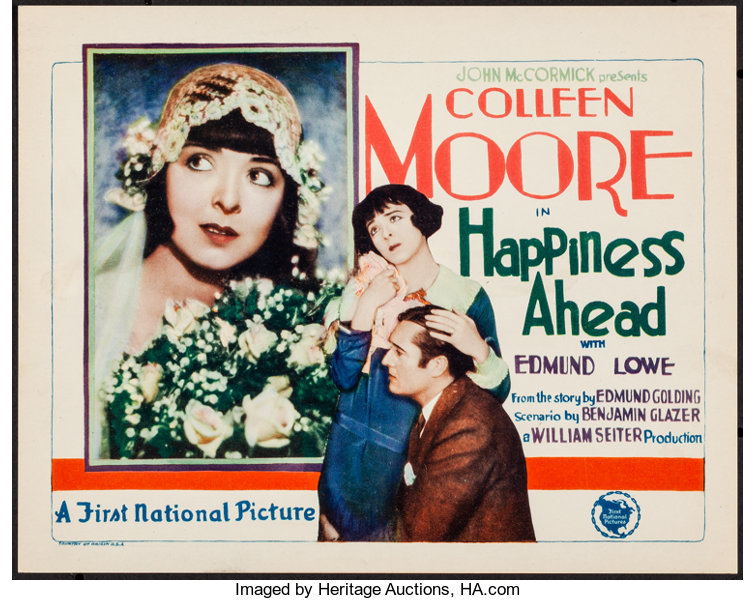
- Lobby card
- Directed by: William A. Seiter
- Written by: Benjamin Glazer (scenario); George Marion, Jr. (titles)
- Story by: Edmund Goulding
- Produced by: John McCormick
- Starring: Colleen Moore; Edmund Lowe; Lilyan Tashman; Diane Ellis
- Cinematography: Sidney Hickox
- Edited by: Paul Weatherwax
- Distributed by: First National
- Release date: June 24, 1928
- Running time: 72 minutes
- Country: United States
- Language: Silent (English intertitles)

Happiness Ahead is a 1928 American silent drama film directed by William A. Seiter and starring Colleen Moore and then husband and wife Edmund Lowe and Lilyan Tashman. It was produced by First National before it acquired by Warner Brothers. Moore was married to the producer John McCormick, who frequently produced her films.

== Cast ==
- Colleen Moore as Mary Randall
- Edmund Lowe as Babe Stewart
- Charles Sellon as Mr. Randall
- Edythe Chapman as Mrs. Randall
- Carlos Durand as Vargas
- Lilyan Tashman as Kay
- Robert Elliott as The Detective
- Diane Ellis as Edna

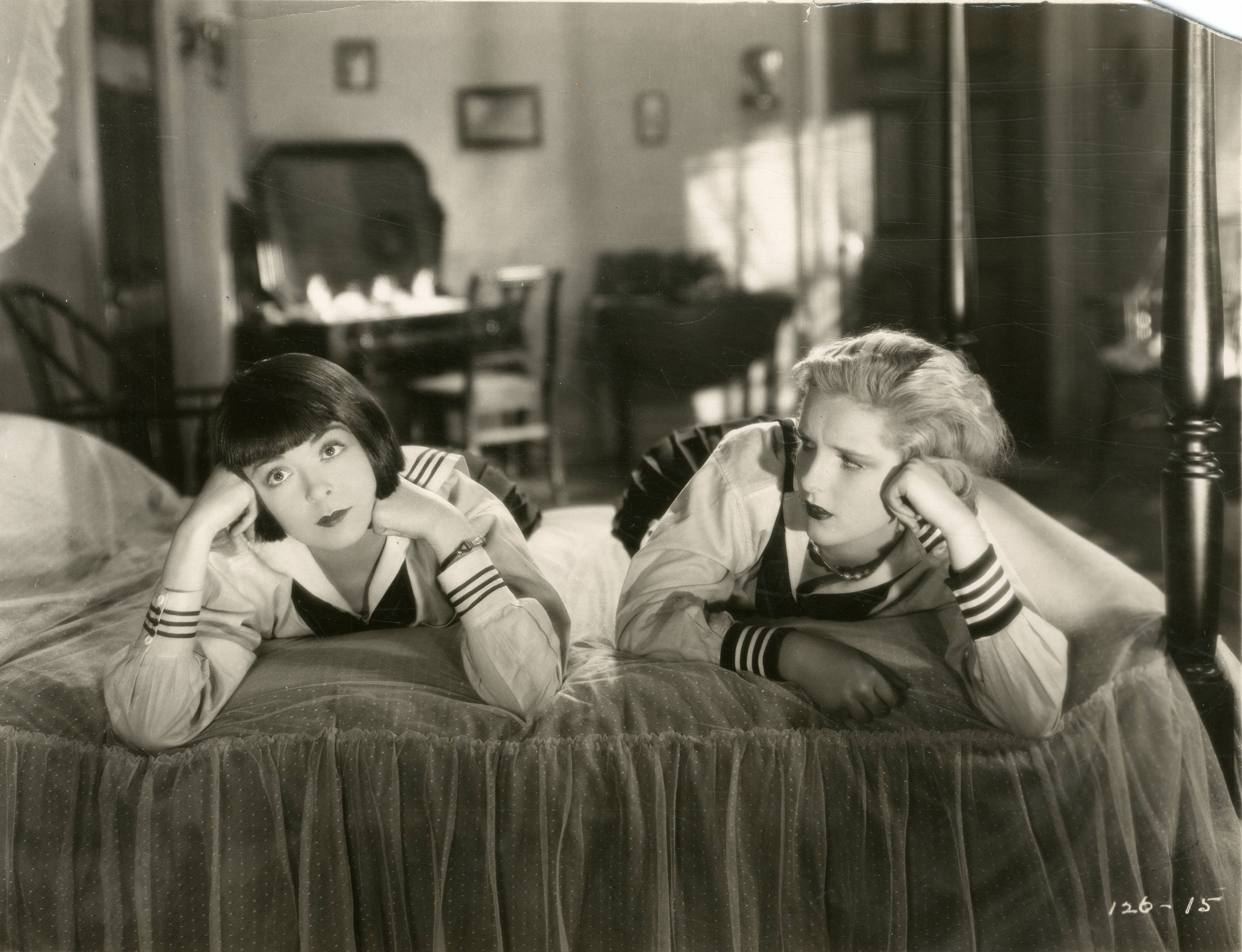
Scene from the movie

== Preservation ==
Happiness Ahead is now a lost film save for the footage from its trailer. Moore was married to the film's producer John McCormick and they held rights to their films. Moore donated copies of her films to the Museum of Modern Art (MOMA), but over the years the archive allowed the films to decay including Happiness Ahead. The trailer was preserved by the Academy Film Archive in 2009.
