= Edmund Lowe =

American actor (1890–1971)

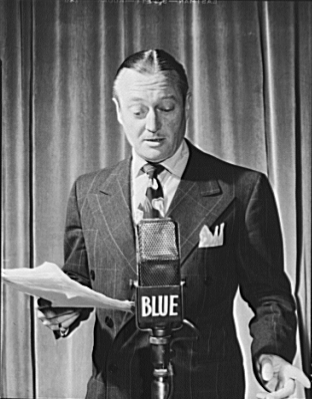
- Lowe on the Blue Network's radio series Three Thirds of a Nation (1942)
- Born: Edmund Sherbourne Lowe; March 3, 1890; San Jose, California, U.S.
- Died: April 21, 1971 (aged 81); Woodland Hills, California, U.S.
- Resting place: San Fernando Mission Cemetery
- Education: Santa Clara University
- Occupation: Actor
- Years active: 1915–1960
- Spouses: Esther Miller (div. 1925) Lilyan Tashman (m. 1925; died 1934) Rita Kaufman (m. 1936; div. 1950)

Edmund Sherbourne Lowe (March 3, 1890 – April 21, 1971) was an American actor. His formative experience began in vaudeville and silent film.

== Biography ==
Lowe's childhood home was at 314 North 1st Street, San Jose. He attended Santa Clara College and entertained the idea of becoming a priest before starting his acting career. His classmate was William Gaxton.

He died in Woodland Hills, California, of lung cancer and is buried at San Fernando Mission Cemetery, Mission Hills, California.

== Quirt and Flagg ==
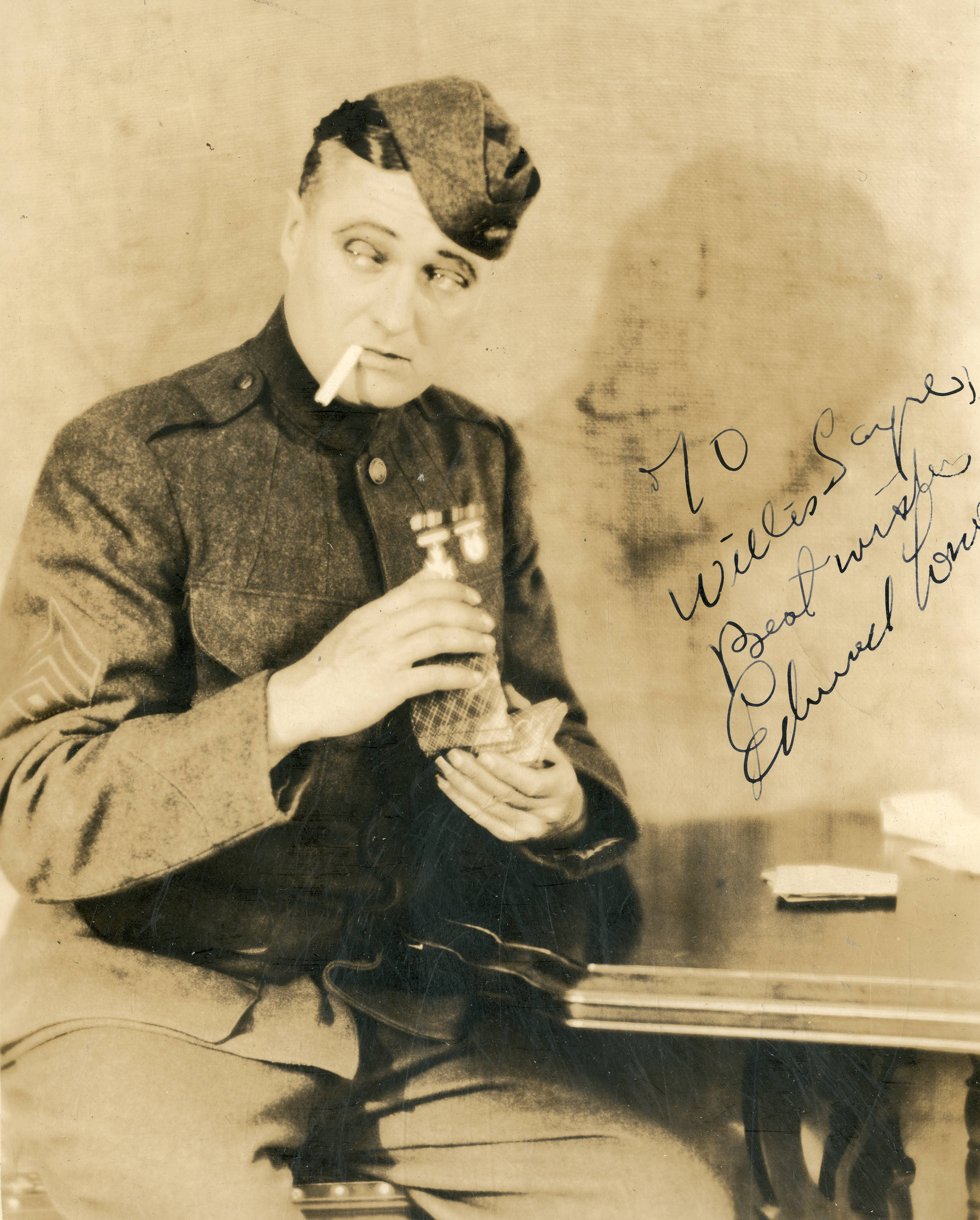
Lowe in 1925

Lowe's career included over 100 films, beginning in 1915. He became established as a popular leading man in silent films. He is best remembered for his role as Sergeant Harry Quirt, smart-mouthed buddy of the equally abrasive Captain Jimmy Flagg (Victor McLaglen) in the 1926 silent feature What Price Glory? directed by Raoul Walsh.

The popularity of Quirt and Flagg virtually guaranteed Edmund Lowe's success in the new talking pictures: audiences could hardly wait to hear the salty Quirt and Flagg insulting each other in spoken dialogue. During the sound era, a musical comedy remake and two sequels were produced, all starring Lowe and McLaglen, with the first two also directed by Raoul Walsh. Lowe reprised his role from the movies in the radio program Captain Flagg and Sergeant Quirt, broadcast on the Blue Network September 28, 1941 - January 25, 1942, and on NBC February 13, 1942 - April 3, 1942. (The radio show probably resulted from Lowe and McLaglen reuniting as battling buddies Harry and Jimmy in the military movie comedy Call Out the Marines.)

Lowe worked steadily as a leading man throughout the 1930s, freelancing at various Hollywood studios. He portrayed the young doctor trying to get out of an affair with Wallace Beery's character's wife, played by Jean Harlow, in Dinner at Eight (1933).

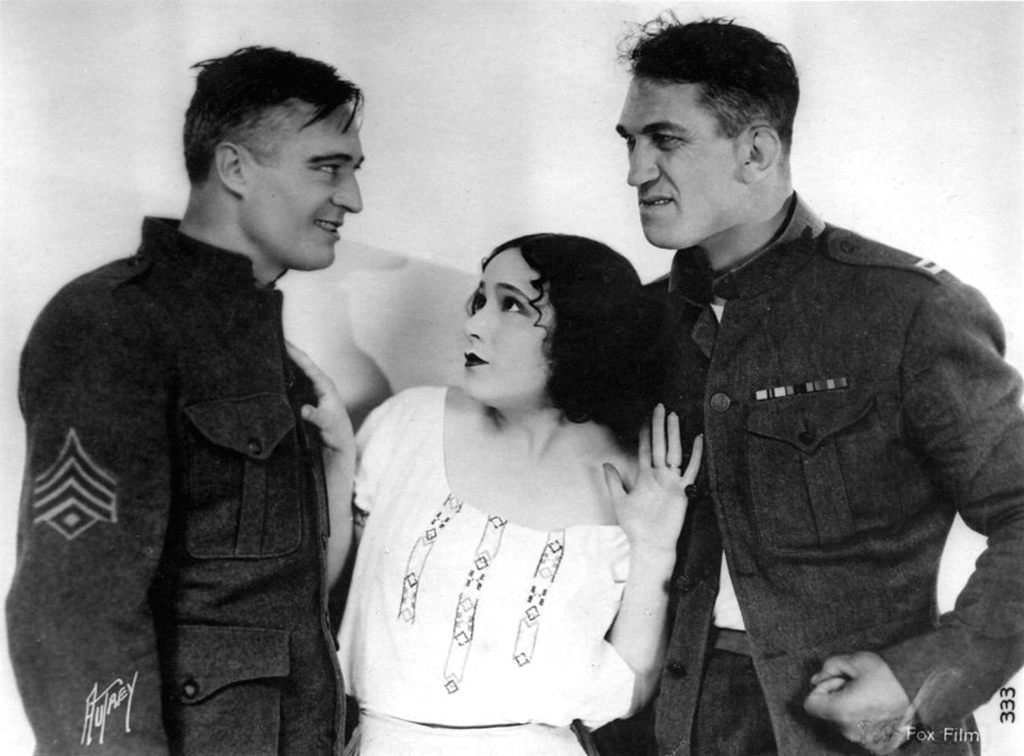
Lowe with Dolores del Río and Victor McLaglen in What Price Glory? (1926)

== Later career ==
A look at Edmund Lowe's screen resumé would indicate that he descended to "Poverty Row" productions in 1942 and his career never recovered. In fact, Lowe's career was stalling as early as 1938, when the actor was too mature to play most romantic leads. His last such role was in 1937's Every Day's a Holiday, in which the 48-year-old Lowe played opposite the 44-year-old Mae West. Lowe shifted gears and began playing strong supporting roles in major films and leads in minor films.

Lowe's friend William K. Howard, a top director of the 1920s, was attempting a comeback at the low-budget Monogram Pictures in 1942. As a favor to Howard, Lowe took the leading role in Klondike Fury. Lowe's loyal gesture took a toll on his professional standing: the small, independent Monogram studio was firmly in Hollywood's minor league. As actor Bill Kennedy told author Scott MacGillivray, "If you were an actor on the way up, like Robert Mitchum or Alan Ladd, working at Monogram was okay -- no stigma. But -- if you were already a star at a big studio like Fox or Paramount and then went to Monogram, a la Edmund Lowe, it was the kiss of death."

Lowe's work in Klondike Fury won him an invitation from Columbia Pictures to star in three comedy-mysteries. Lowe also kept working at Monogram, notably in the 1945 crime thriller Dillinger, a surprise hit. Lowe's last starring movie role was in Monogram's The Strange Mr. Gregory (1945).

In 1951-52 Lowe starred in 38 episodes of the television show Front Page Detective and appeared as the elderly lead villain in the first episode of Maverick opposite James Garner in 1957. Lowe appeared occasionally in major motion pictures through 1960.

== Marriages ==
After his first marriage to Esther Miller ended in early 1925. Lowe met Lilyan Tashman while filming Ports of Call. Lowe and Tashman were married on September 21, 1925, before the release of the film. The two had homes, in Beverly Hills and Malibu, California. They were married until Tashman's death from cancer at age 37 in 1934.

Seventy years after Tashman's death, author E.J. Fleming claimed Lowe was a homosexual and Tashman was a lesbian. If the claims were true, fan magazine writers and newspaper columnists made no mention of them during Tashman's lifetime or for 70 years after her death.

Lowe's third wife was costume designer Rita Kaufman, married from 1936 to 1950.

== Filmography ==
- The Wild Olive (1915) as Charles Conquest
- The Spreading Dawn (1917) as Captain Lewis Nugent
- Vive la France! (1918) as Jean Picard
- Someone Must Pay (1919) as Jim Burke
- Eyes of Youth (1919) as Peter Judson
- The Woman Gives (1920) as Robert Milton
- A Woman's Business (1920) as Johnny Lister
- Someone in the House (1920) as Jim Burke
- Madonnas and Men (1920) as Gordon Turner
- The Devil (1921) as Paul de Veaux
- My Lady's Latchkey (1921) as Nelson Smith
- Living Lies (1922) as Dixon Grant
- Peacock Alley (1922) as Phil Garrison
- The Silent Command (1923) as Capt. Richard Decatur
- In the Palace of the King (1923) as Don John
- Wife in Name Only (1923) as Norman Arleigh
- The White Flower (1923) as Bob Rutherford
- Nellie, the Beautiful Cloak Model (1924) as Jack Carroll
- Honor Among Men (1924) as Prince Kaloney
- Barbara Frietchie (1924) as Captain William Trumbull
- The Brass Bowl (1924) as Dan Maitland
- East of Suez (1925) as George Tevis
- Greater Than a Crown (1925) as Tom Conway
- Marriage in Transit (1925) as Cyril Gordon
- The Winding Stair (1925) as Paul
- The Kiss Barrier (1925) as Richard March
- Champion of Lost Causes (1925) as Loring
- Ports of Call (1925) as Kirk Rainsford
- East Lynne (1925) as Archibald Carlyle
- The Fool (1925) as Daniel Gilchrist
- Soul Mates (1925) as Lord Tancred
- What Price Glory? (1926) as 1st Sergeant Quirt
- Siberia (1926) as Leonid Petroff
- The Palace of Pleasure (1926) as Ricardo Madons
- Black Paradise (1926) as Graham
- The Wizard (1927) as Stanley Gordon
- Publicity Madness (1927) as Pete Clark
- Is Zat So? (1927) as Hap Harley
- One Increasing Purpose (1927) as Sim Paris
- Dressed to Kill (1928) as 'Mile-Away Barry'
- Outcast (1928) as Geoffrey
- Happiness Ahead (1928) as Babe Stewart
- In Old Arizona (1929) as Sgt. Mickey Dunn
- This Thing Called Love (1929) as Robert Collings
- The Cock-Eyed World (1929) as Sgt. Harry Quirt
- The Painted Angel (1929) as Brood
- Thru Different Eyes (1929) as Harvey Manning
- Making the Grade (1929) as Herbert Littell Dodsworth
- Happy Days (1929) as Show Performer
- Good Intentions (1930) as David Cresson
- The Bad One (1930) as Jerry Flanagan
- Born Reckless (1930) as Louis Berretti
- Part Time Wife (1930) as Jim Murdock
- Scotland Yard (1930) as Dakin Barrolles
- Transatlantic (1931) as Monty Greer
- Don't Bet on Women (1931) as Roger Fallon
- The Spider (1931) as Chatrand
- The Cisco Kid (1931) as Sgt. Michael Patrick "Mickey" Dunn
- Women of All Nations (1931) as Sergeant Harry Quirt
- Men on Call (1931) as Chuck Long
- The Devil Is Driving (1932) as Orville "Gabby" Denton
- Misleading Lady (1932) as Jack Craigen
- Chandu the Magician (1932) as Chandu
- Attorney for the Defense (1932) as William J. Burton
- Guilty as Hell (1932) as Russell Kirk
- Dinner at Eight (1933) as Dr. Wayne Talbot
- Let's Fall in Love (1933) as Ken Lane
- I Love That Man (1933) as Brains Stanley
- Hot Pepper (1933) as Harry Quirt
- Her Bodyguard (1933) as Casey McCarthy
- Gift of Gab (1934) as Philip Gabney
- Bombay Mail (1934) as Inspector Dyke
- No More Women (1934) as Three Time
- The Great Impersonation (1935) as Sir Everend Dominey
- Black Sheep (1935) as John Francis Dugan
- The Great Hotel Murder (1935) as Roger Blackwood
- The Best Man Wins (1935) as Toby
- King Solomon of Broadway (1935) as King Solomon
- Thunder in the Night (1935) as Captain Karl Torok
- Grand Exit (1935) as Tom Fletcher
- Under Pressure (1935) as Shocker Dugan
- Mister Dynamite (1935) as "Dynamite" T.N. Thompson
- Seven Sinners (1936) as Harwood
- Mad Holiday (1936) as Philip Trent
- The Garden Murder Case (1936) as Philo Vance
- The Girl on the Front Page (1936) as "Hank" Gilman
- The Squeaker (1937) as Barrabal
- Espionage (1937) as Kenneth
- Every Day's a Holiday (1937) as Capt. Jim McCarey
- Murder on Diamond Row (1937) as Barrabal
- Under Cover of Night (1937) as Christopher Cross
- Newsboys' Home (1938) as Perry Warner
- Secrets of a Nurse (1938) as John Dodge
- The Witness Vanishes (1939) as Mark Peters
- Our Neighbors – The Carters (1939) as Bill Hastings
- Wolf of New York (1940) as Chris Faulkner
- Honeymoon Deferred (1940) as Adam Farradene
- The Crooked Road (1940) as Danny Driscoll / John Vincent / George Atwater
- I Love You Again (1940) as Duke Sheldon
- Men Against the Sky (1940) as Dan McLean
- Double Date (1941) as Roger Baldwin
- Flying Cadets (1941) as Captain Rockcliffe 'Lucky Rocky' Ames
- Call Out the Marines (1942) as Harry Curtis
- Klondike Fury (1942) as Dr. John Mandre
- Murder in Times Square (1943) as Cory Williams
- Dangerous Blondes (1943) as Ralph McCormick
- The Girl in the Case (1944) as William Warner
- Oh, What a Night (1944) as Rand
- Dillinger (1945) as Specs Green
- The Enchanted Forest (1945) as Steven Blaine
- The Strange Mr. Gregory (1946) as Mr. Gregory / Lane Talbot
- Good Sam (1948) as H.C. Borden
- Intruder in the Dust (1950) as Gowrie twin
- Around the World in 80 Days (1956) as the engineer of the SS Henrietta
- Wings of Eagles (1957) as Admiral Moffett
- The Last Hurrah (1958) as Johnny Byrne (uncredited)
- Plunderers of Painted Flats (1959) as Ned East
- Heller in Pink Tights (1960) as Manfred 'Doc' Montague
