= Gentlemen of the Press =

1929 film by Millard Webb

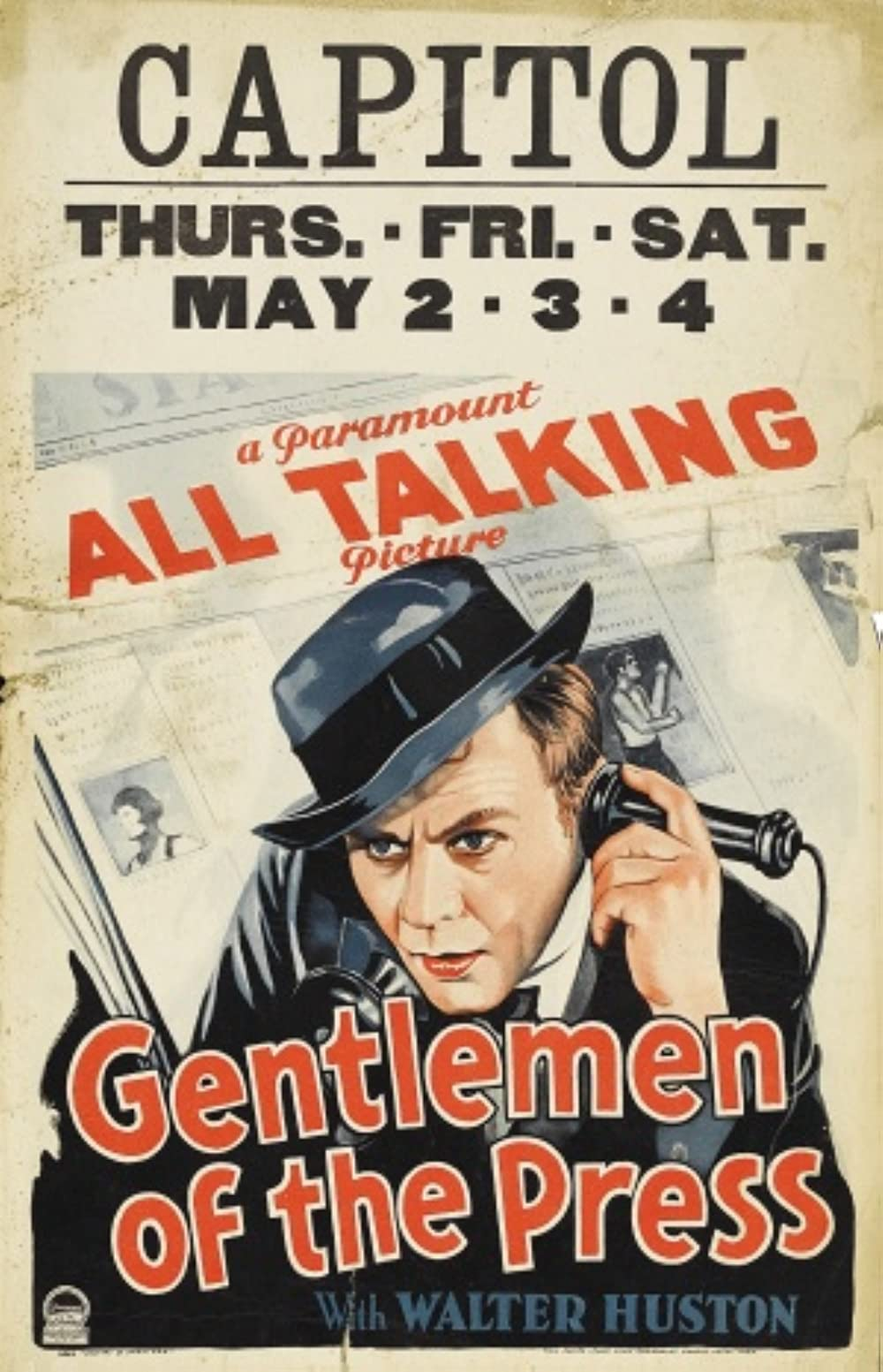
- Window card poster
- Directed by: Millard Webb
- Written by: Ward Morehouse (play); Bartlett Cormack (screenplay)
- Produced by: Monta Bell
- Starring: Walter Huston; Kay Francis
- Cinematography: George J. Folsey
- Edited by: Morton Blumenstock
- Distributed by: Paramount Pictures
- Release date: May 4, 1929
- Running time: 80 minutes
- Country: United States
- Language: English

Gentlemen of the Press (1929)

Gentlemen of the Press is a 1929 American pre-Code film starring Walter Huston in his first feature film role, and Kay Francis and Norman Foster plus an uncredited Brian Donlevy in their film debuts.

The film is based on Ward Morehouse's 1928 Broadway play Gentlemen of the Press.

== Cast ==
- Walter Huston as Wickland Snell
- Charles Ruggles as Charlie Haven
- Kay Francis as Myra May
- Betty Lawford as Dorothy Snell Hanley
- Norman Foster as Ted Hanley
- Duncan Penwarden as Mr. Higgenbottom
- Brian Donlevy as Kelly (a reporter) (uncredited)

== Preservation ==
The film survives in a copy sold to MCA for television distribution.

== In popular culture ==
In the 1930 silent melodrama by Yasujirō Ozu, That Night's Wife (Sono yo no tsuma), a poster of this film is prominently displayed (Ozu, who had a "passionate love of American film", according to scholar David Bordwell, often featured in his films posters of movies he liked).

== See also ==
- List of early sound feature films (1926–1929)
