= Janet Pavek =

American actress

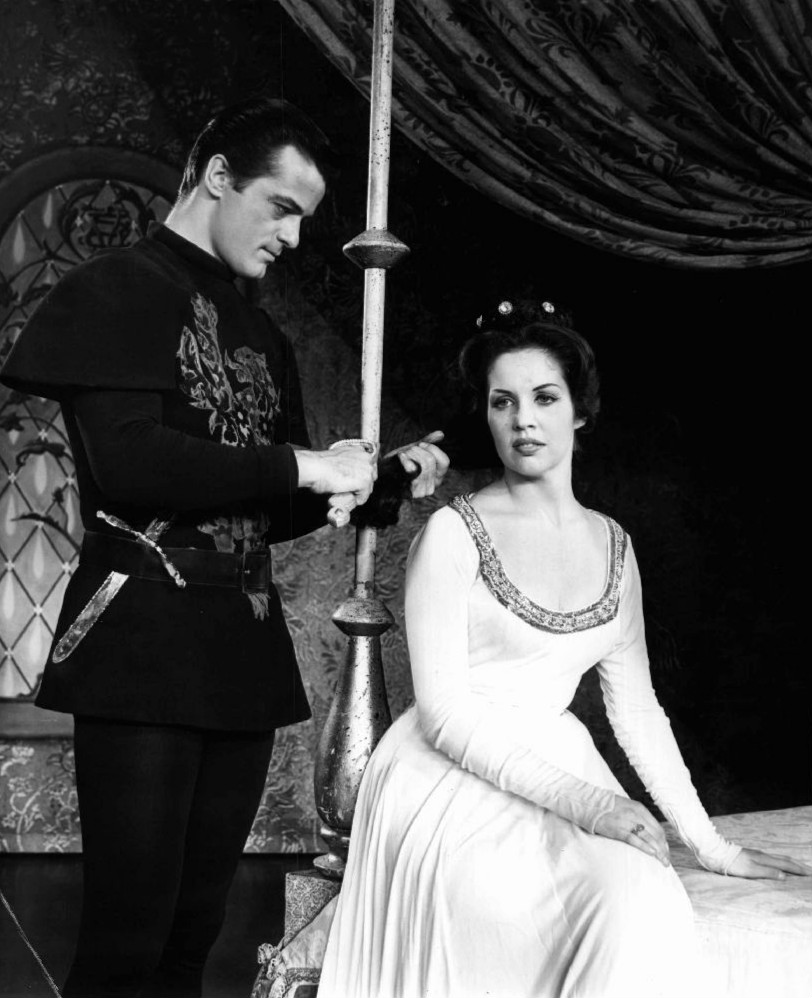
Pavek as Guenevere and Robert Goulet as Lancelot in Camelot, 1962.

Janet Pavek (12 August 1936 – 6 January 2009) was an American operatic soprano and musical theatre actress.

== Biography ==
Pavek was born and raised in Bronxville, New York and began studying singing at the age of eleven. She won the Miss Eastchester pageant in 1953 at the age of sixteen. That same year she began her career on Broadway as a member of the ensemble of Rodgers and Hammerstein's Me and Juliet which opened on May 28, 1953, and ran for more than 300 performances. She returned to Broadway in early 1955, replacing Florence Henderson in the title role of Harold Rome's Fanny. She left the production in April 1955 to join the cast of Ankles Aweigh. In 1956 she portrayed the role of Fanny again in the original West End production of the show with Robert Morley and Kevin Scott. She returned to Broadway in 1960 to play Sita Roy in the original cast of Sammy Fain's Christine. Her final Broadway appearance was in 1962, taking over the role of Guenevere in Lerner and Loewe's Camelot after Patricia Bredin (who had replaced Julie Andrews) left the production.

In 1961 Pavek married veteran musical theatre actor Joe Cusanelli and that same year made her operatic debut with the New York City Opera. After leaving Camelot, Pavek made her debut at the Metropolitan Opera on November 9, 1963, singing Musetta in Giacomo Puccini's La bohème with John Alexander as Rodolfo, Nicoletta Panni as Mimì, Calvin Marsh as Marcello, and Fausto Cleva conducting. She reprised the role of Musetta for her debut with the San Francisco Opera in 1964. She went on to make several more opera appearances during the 1960s and 1970s, including performances at the Pittsburgh Opera, Fort Worth Opera, and Cincinnati Opera. Her operatic repertoire included the title role in Puccini's Manon Lescaut, Liu in Puccini's Turandot, Nedda in Pagliacci, and Rosalinda in Die Fledermaus among several other leading soprano roles. She also appeared in concert and recitals throughout the United States, Europe, Israel and South America. In addition to her work on the stage, Pavek sang on a number of television programs, including The Bell Telephone Hour, The Tonight Show and The Ed Sullivan Show. After she retired from performing she taught singing out of a private studio.

Pavek died in New Port Richey, Florida from complications resulting from liver failure at the age of 72.
