= Is Zat So? =

1927 film

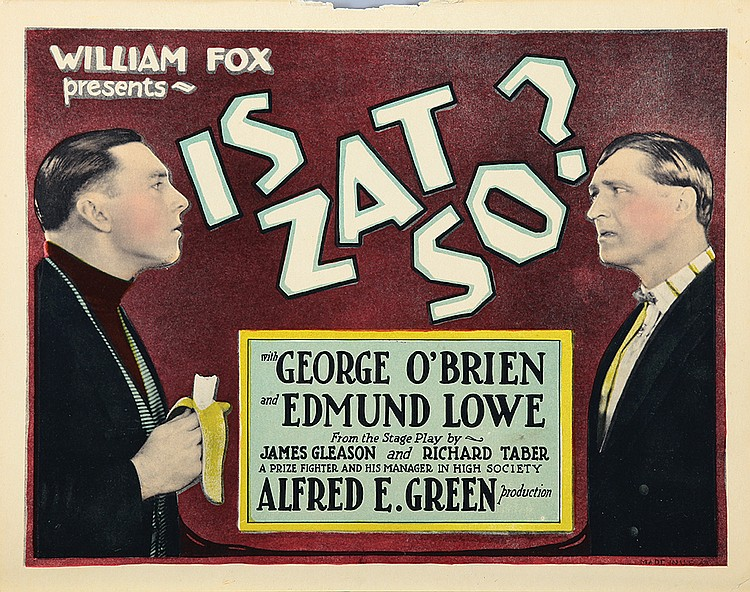
- Lobby card
- Directed by: Alfred E. Green
- Written by: Philip Klein
- Based on: Is Zat So? by James Gleason and Richard Taber
- Produced by: William Fox
- Starring: George O'Brien; Edmund Lowe; Katherine Perry; Douglas Fairbanks Jr.
- Cinematography: George Schneiderman
- Production company: Fox Film Corporation
- Distributed by: Fox Film Corporation
- Release date: May 15, 1927
- Running time: 70 minutes
- Country: United States
- Language: Silent (English intertitles)

Is Zat So? is a lost 1927 American silent comedy film directed by Alfred E. Green and starring George O'Brien, Edmund Lowe, and Douglas Fairbanks Jr. It was produced and distributed by the Fox Film Corporation.

The film was based on a 1925 play of the same name by James Gleason and Richard Taber and produced by George Brinton McLellan, which ran for 634 performances at the 39th Street Theatre in New York and opened in the same year at the Adelphi Theatre in Chicago. The play starred Gleason, Sidney Riggs and a pre-talkies Robert Armstrong.

== Cast ==
- George O'Brien as Ed 'Chick' Cowan
- Edmund Lowe as Hap Hurley
- Katherine Perry as Marie Mestretti
- Cyril Chadwick as Robert Parker
- Doris Lloyd as Sue Parker
- Diane Ellis as Florence Hanley
- Richard Maitland as Major Fitz Stanley
- Douglas Fairbanks Jr. as G. Clifton Blackburn
- Philippe De Lacy as Little Jimmy Parker
- Jack Herrick as Gas House Duffy

== Preservation ==
With no prints of Is Zat So? located in any film archives, it is a lost film.

== See also ==
- 1937 Fox vault fire

https://www.youtube.com/watch?v=O_UrZ4gpn8M
