= Christine (musical) =

Musical

- Christine Playbill
- Music: Sammy Fain
- Lyrics: Paul Francis Webster
- Book: Pearl S. Buck; Charles K. Peck Jr.
- Setting: India
- Basis: "My Indian Family" by Hilda Wernher
- Premiere: April 28, 1960: 46th Street Theatre
- Productions: 1960 Broadway

Christine is a musical by Pearl S. Buck and Charles K. Peck Jr. (book), Paul Francis Webster (lyrics) and Sammy Fain (music). Loosely based on the 1945 novel My Indian Family by Hilda Wernher, it tells the story of a woman who travels to India where she ends up falling in love with her recently widowed Indian son-in-law. Notable for the involvement of Pulitzer and Nobel prize-winning author Pearl S. Buck, the musical premiered on Broadway in 1960.

== History ==
Pearl S. Buck first adapted Hilda Werhner's book My Indian Family for a 1945 stage production at Stanford University. While this production did not move beyond Stanford, it was notable for featuring Jack Palance in his first acting role. Oscar Lerman and Martin B. Cohen later tapped Buck for a musical stage adaptation which they hoped to present during the 1957–1958 Broadway season. Rewrites on the libretto took much longer than expected, with a "final" version not being ready until 1959.

== Synopsis ==
The musical is based on the book My Indian Family, which tells the story of an Austrian woman who travels to India to spend time with her daughter and her Indian son-in-law. While in India, the daughter dies and the mother-in-law steps in to help the widowed husband find a new bride. The musical follows some of the broad strokes of the book, but with significant changes including a love story between the mother-in-law (Christine) and the widowed son-in-law.

=== Act I ===
Christine arrives in India to visit her daughter Mary-Anne, and her daughter's husband, Dr Rashil Singh ("Welcome Song/My Indian Family"). She discovers though that her daughter has died in childbirth, along with the child, her widowed doctor husband racked with sorrow and guilt over not being able to save her life ("A Doctor's Soliloquy").

Aided by Dr Singh's Auntie and Uncle, Christine takes on the mother's duty to find a new wife for her son-in-law ("How to Pick a Man a Wife" and "The Lovely Girls of Akbarabad"), but instead finds herself falling in love with him ("Room in My Heart"). As Act I ends, Christine and the Doctor sing of their love for each other ("I Never Meant to Fall in Love").

=== Act II ===
Act II opens on explorations of the perceived cultural peculiarities of India ("Freedom Can Be a Most Uncomfortable Thing" and "Ireland Was Never Like This"), before exploring the unrequited love a local girl, Sita Roy, has for Dr. Singh ("He Loves Her"). Sita works in the doctor's clinic and notes that the locals have stopped coming to the doctor's dispensary, due to Christine's presence, so Sita implores Christine to leave. Christine tells the doctor of her discomfort with the situation, but he asks her to marry him and she agrees ("Christine").

As the ceremony is prepared in which Christine is to reveal the wife she has chosen for Dr. Singh, she decides that she cannot stay after all ("I Love Him"). At the ceremony, she shocks everyone by choosing Sita Roy to be his bride. She tells Dr. Singh she must return to Ireland ("The Woman I Was Before"), which she does, slipping away while Sita and Dr. Singh's wedding is taking place.

== Production ==
Following its out of town tryout at the Erlanger Theatre, it opened on Broadway at the 46th Street Theatre on April 28, 1960 and closed on May 8, 1960, after 12 performances. The show was directed by Jerome Chodorov, with set and lighting design by Jo Mielziner, costumes by Alvin Colt, choreography by Hanya Holm, and dance and vocal arrangements by Trude Rittmann.

The cast featured Maureen O'Hara (Lady Christine FitzSimons), Nancy Andrews (Auntie), Laurie Archer (Amora), Bhaskar (Rainath), Steve Curry (Krishna), Leslye Hunter (Jaya), Daniel Keyes (Dr.MacGowan), Phil Leeds (Uncle), Morley Meredith (Dr. Rashil Singh), Jonathan Morris (Mohan Roy), Janet Pavek (Sita Roy), Augie Rios (Rajendra), and Barbara Webb (The Matchmaker).

== Song list ==
Sources: Internet Broadway Database; AllMusic

Act I

- "Welcome Song"—Auntie, Uncle, Rainath, Children and Chorus
- "My Indian Family"—Lady Christine FitzSimons
- "A Doctor's Soliloquy"—Dr. Rashil Singh
- "UNICEF Song"—The Children
- "My Little Lost Girl"—Children and Dr. Rashil Singh
- "I'm Just a Little Sparrow"—Jaya, Auntie, Rajendra, Servants and Children
- "We're Just a Pair of Sparrows"—Lady Christine FitzSimons and Jaya
- "How to Pick a Man a Wife"—Auntie and Uncle
- "The Lovely Girls of Akbarabad"—The Matchmaker and Chorus
- "Room in My Heart"—Lady Christine FitzSimons
- "The Divali Festival"—Rainath, Dancers and Singers
- "I Never Meant to Fall in Love"—Lady Christine FitzSimons and Dr. Rashil Singh

Act II

- "Freedom Can Be a Most Uncomfortable Thing"—Auntie and Friends
- "Ireland Was Never Like This"—Lady Christine FitzSimons and Dancers
- "He Loves Her"—Sita Roy
- "Christine"—Dr. Rashil Singh
- "Room in My Heart (Reprise)"—Lady Christine FitzSimons
- "Freedom Can Be a Most Uncomfortable Thing (Reprise)"—Auntie and Uncle
- "The Woman I was Before"—Lady Christine FitzSimons
- "A Doctor's Soliloquy (Reprise)"—Lady Christine FitzSimons and Dr. Rashil Singh
- "I Never Meant to Fall in Love (Reprise)"—Dr. Rashil Singh and Lady Christine FitzSimons

== Recordings ==
Christine: Original Broadway Cast was released in 1960 on Columbia Masterworks Records, then re-released in 2002 on compact disc by DRG Records.
