= Richard Rodgers Theatre =

Broadway theater in Manhattan, New York

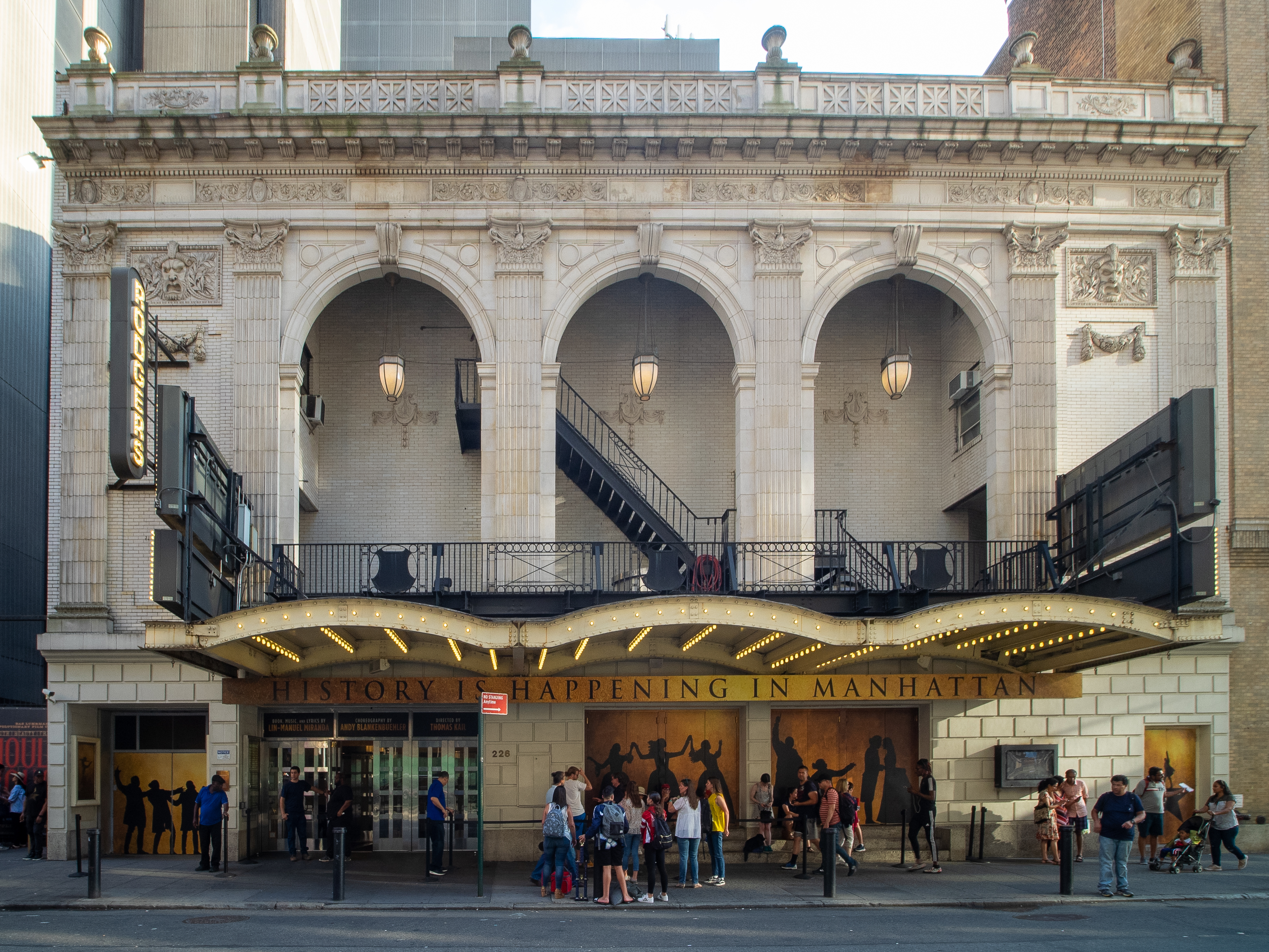
- Showing the musical Hamilton in 2019
- Interactive map of Richard Rodgers Theatre
- Former names: Chanin's 46th Street Theatre (1925–1932); 46th Street Theatre (1932–1990)
- Address: 226 West 46th Street; Manhattan, New York; United States
- Coordinates: 40°45′33″N 73°59′12″W
- Owner: Nederlander Organization
- Capacity: 1,400 (Note: This capacity is approximate and may vary depending on the show.)
- Type: Broadway
- Production: Hamilton

Construction
- Opened: February 7, 1925 (101 years ago)
- Architect: Herbert J. Krapp
- General contractor: Chanin Construction Company

Website
- broadwaydirect.com/venue/richard-rodgers-theatre/

New York City Landmark
- Designated: November 17, 1987
- Reference no.: 1333
- Designated entity: Facade

New York City Landmark
- Designated: November 17, 1987
- Reference no.: 1334
- Designated entity: Auditorium interior

The Richard Rodgers Theatre (formerly Chanin's 46th Street Theatre and the 46th Street Theatre) is a Broadway theater at 226 West 46th Street in the Theater District of Midtown Manhattan in New York City, New York, U.S. Opened in 1925, it was designed by Herbert J. Krapp and was constructed for Irwin Chanin. It has approximately 1,400 seats across two levels and is operated by the Nederlander Organization. Both the facade and the auditorium interior are New York City landmarks.

The facade is divided into two sections. The eastern section, containing the auditorium, is designed in the neo-Renaissance style with white brick and terracotta. The auditorium's ground floor has an entrance under a marquee, above which is a loggia of three double-height arches, as well as a entablature and balustrade at the top. The facade's western section, comprising the stage house, is seven stories high and is faced in buff-colored brick. The auditorium contains neo-Renaissance detailing, steep stadium seating in the orchestra level, a large balcony, and a shallow domed ceiling. Due to the slope of the seats, the rear of the orchestra is one story above ground. There are also box seats near the front of the auditorium on two tiers.

Chanin's 46th Street Theatre was the first Broadway theater developed by Irwin S. Chanin, and it was immediately leased to the Shubert brothers when it opened. The Shuberts bought the building outright in 1931 and renamed it the 46th Street Theatre. In 1945, the theater was taken over by Robert W. Dowling of the City Investing Company. In 1960, it was purchased by the producer Lester Osterman, who sold it to producers Stephen R. Friedman and Irwin Meyer in 1978. The Nederlander Organization purchased the venue in 1981 and renamed it to honor the composer Richard Rodgers in 1990. Over the years, the Richard Rodgers has hosted eleven Tony Award-winning productions: Guys and Dolls, Redhead, How to Succeed in Business Without Really Trying, 1776, Raisin, Nine, Fences, Lost in Yonkers, In the Heights, and Hamilton. Other long-running shows at the theater have included Panama Hattie and One Touch of Venus.

== Site ==
The Richard Rodgers Theatre is on 226 West 46th Street, on the south sidewalk between Eighth Avenue and Broadway, near Times Square in the Theater District of Midtown Manhattan in New York City, New York, U.S. The square land lot covers 11,295 ft^{2} (1,049.3 m^{2}). The theater has a frontage of 112 ft (34 m) on 46th Street and a depth of 100 ft (30 m).

The Richard Rodgers shares the block with the Music Box Theatre to the south, the Imperial Theatre to the west, and the New York Marriott Marquis to the east. Other nearby buildings include the Paramount Hotel (including Sony Hall) and Lena Horne Theatre to the northwest; the Hotel Edison and Lunt-Fontanne Theatre to the north; One Astor Plaza to the southeast; the Booth and Gerald Schoenfeld Theatres to the south; and the Bernard B. Jacobs, and John Golden Theatres to the southwest. Prior to the theater's construction, the site was occupied by six brownstone residences.

== Design ==
The Richard Rodgers Theatre, originally the 46th Street Theatre, was designed by Herbert J. Krapp in the neo-Renaissance style and was constructed in 1924 for the Chanin brothers. The exterior and interior designs were particularly ornate, even when compared with other Broadway theaters, because the 46th Street was the first theater developed by Irwin Chanin. Since 1990, the theater has been named after composer Richard Rodgers (1902–1979). It is operated by the Nederlander Organization.

=== Facade ===
The facade consists of two sections. The eastern section is wider and is symmetrical, containing the auditorium entrance. It is made of glazed white brick with white terracotta decorations. The upper stories of the auditorium-entrance section are designed as a colonnade with a central loggia. The western section, which contains the stage house, is seven stories high and contains a buff-brick facade. Early sources cite the theater facade as also containing limestone.

==== Auditorium section ====
The first story of the auditorium facade is symmetrically arranged, though the eastern section is shorter than its width. There is a water table made of terrazzo, above which are rusticated blocks. On the eastern side of the ground-floor facade, a double metal door connects to a service alley. To the right, or west, are three glass-and-aluminum double doors connecting with the box office lobby. Next to that, terrazzo steps lead to emergency-exit doors from the auditorium. The westernmost opening consists of a metal stage door. The ground story has wooden display boxes and is topped by a cornice. A marquee hangs over the center three openings; it replaced the original marquee, which has since been removed.

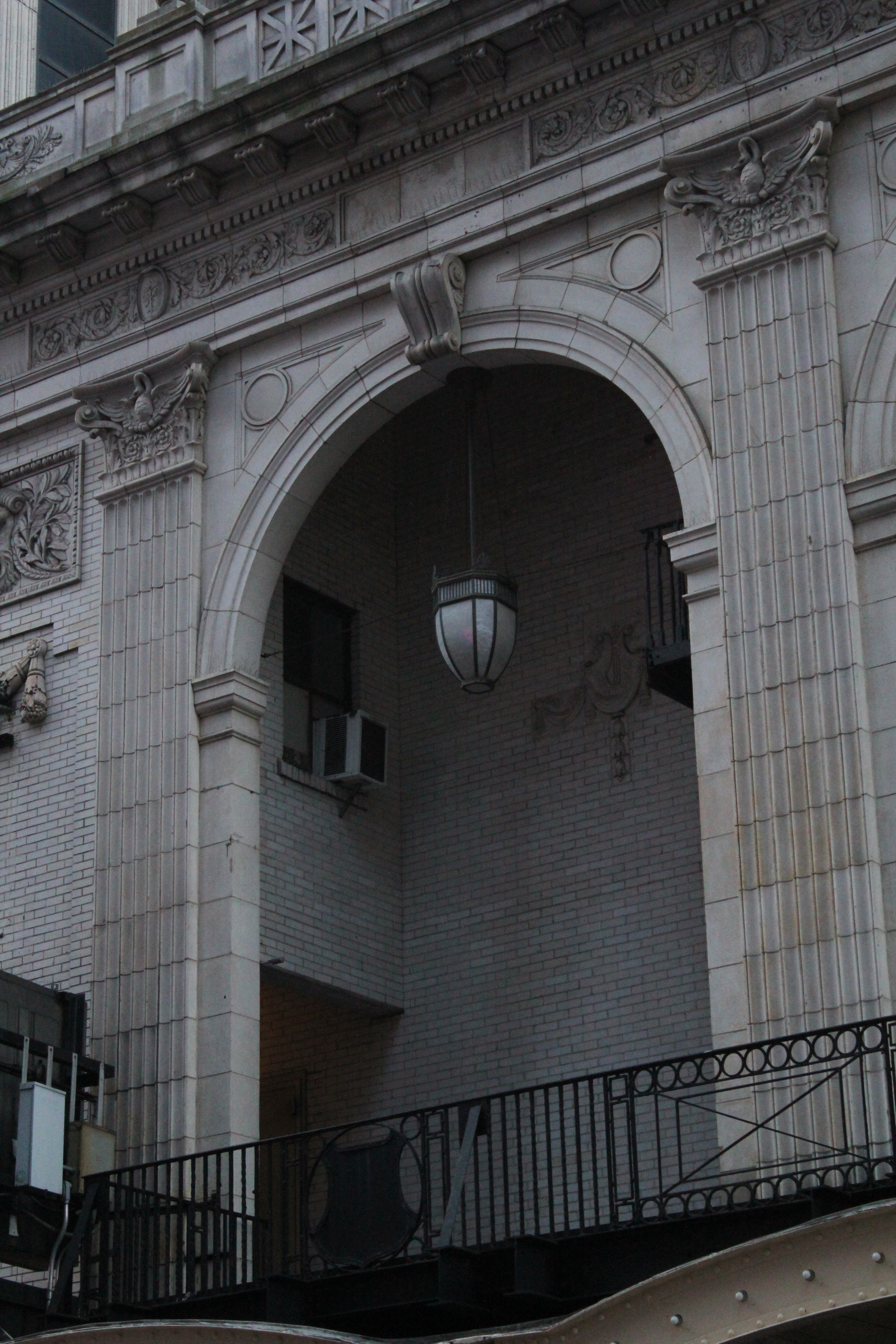
Arch detail

The auditorium's second and third stories contain outer bays that flank a loggia with three arches. Each arch has a keystone with a console bracket, and they are flanked by pilasters with Corinthian-style capitals with terracotta swans. The bottoms of the central bays contain an iron railing. Behind the arches is a fire stair and a brick wall with terracotta lyres, swags, and bellflowers. The outer bays contain white-brick wall sections, which are topped by swags and rectangular panels with masks. There are pilasters next to each of the outer bays, and a sign with the theater's name is suspended from the easternmost bay. Running above the facade is a entablature, containing a frieze with panels, shields, and rinceaux, as well as a cornice supported by terracotta modillions. The roof of the auditorium has a terracotta balustrade with urns that divide it into bays. The center three bays of the balustrade have latticework while the outer bays have shields and foliate decorations. Another brick parapet, with terracotta coping, runs behind the terracotta balustrade.

==== Stage-house section ====
The stage-house wing is utilitarian in design. The first story of the stage house contains a water table made of terrazzo. There are openings for the stage door, as well as larger doors to transport sets and other large items. On the upper stories, there are four window openings on each floor, as well as brick pilasters. Above the stage house's seventh floor is a cornice with modillions; it is made of sheet metal and decorated in the Adam style.

=== Auditorium ===
The auditorium has an orchestra level, one balcony, boxes, and a stage behind the proscenium arch. The auditorium space is designed with plaster decorations in low relief. According to the Nederlander Organization, the auditorium has 1,319 seats; meanwhile, The Broadway League cites a capacity of 1,400 seats and Playbill cites 1,321 seats. The original configuration had 1,500 seats, composed of 640 in the orchestra and 850 in the balcony, as well as eight boxes. The theater was initially decorated in red and gold. The auditorium's orchestra level and balcony are both accessed from the same lobby. This layout was part of an effort by Irwin Chanin to "democratize" the seating arrangement of the theater. For a similar reason, the Richard Rodgers was designed with a single balcony rather than the typical two, since Chanin perceived second balconies to be too distant.

==== Seating areas ====
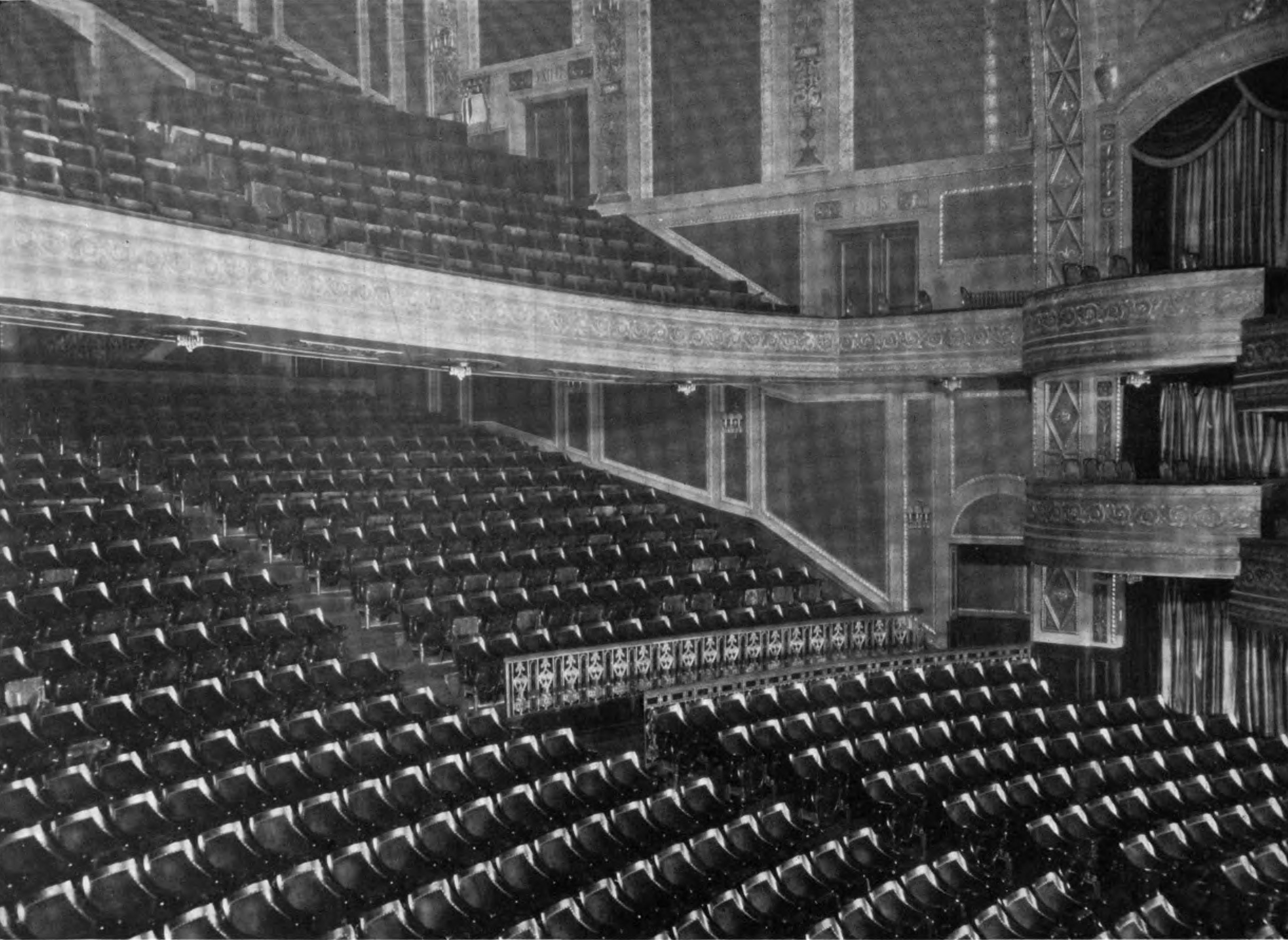
The orchestra level's steeply raked stadium seating

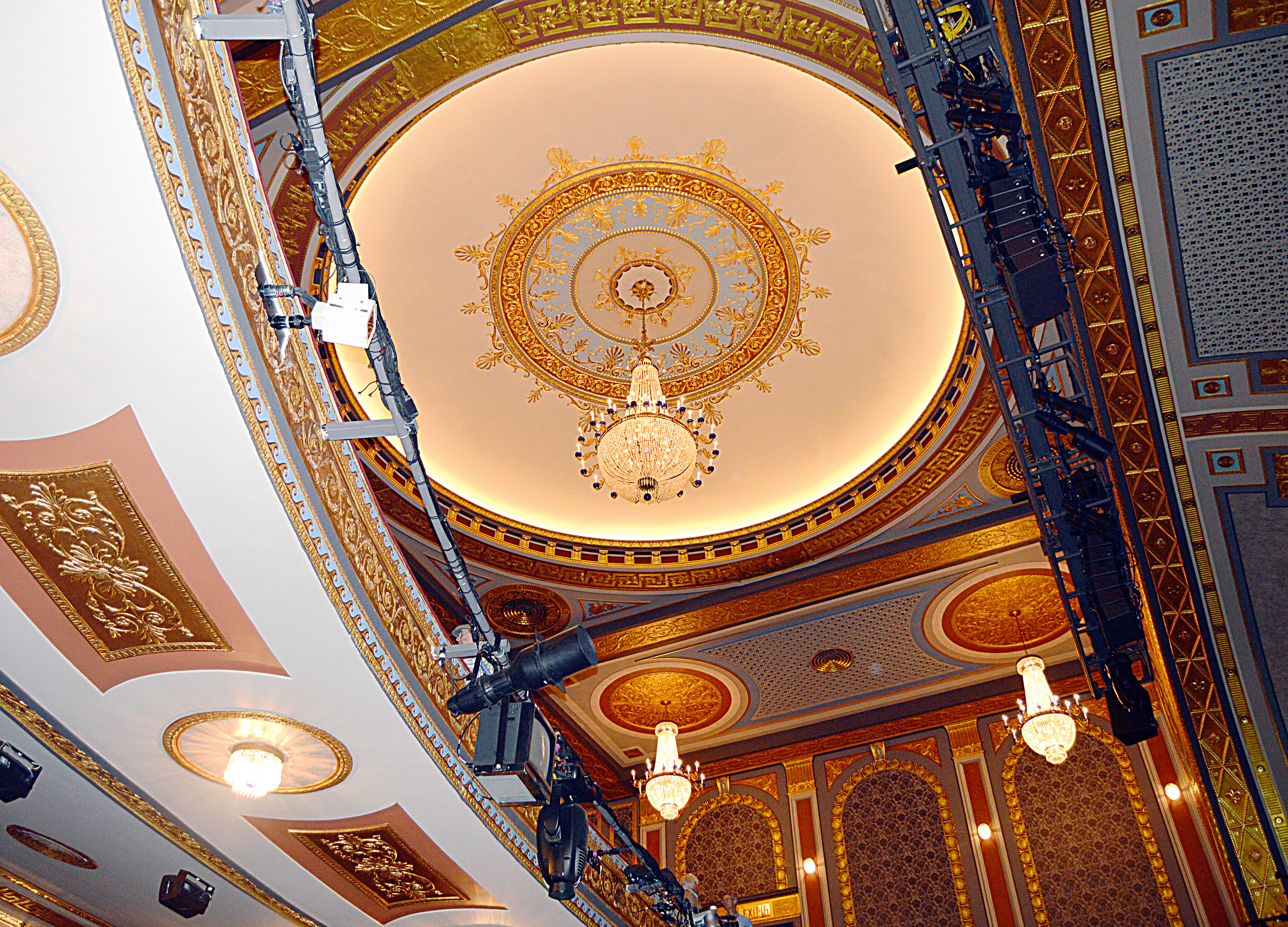
View from under the balcony

The rear (east) end of the orchestra contains a promenade with decorative bands on its ceiling. The orchestra is raked, but its rear rows contain stadium seating that is more steeply sloped than the front rows. While the front rows are at ground level, the rearmost level is almost one story higher, allowing the entrance foyer to be placed under the rear of the orchestra. This stadium seating configuration was supposedly used to improve visibility and acoustics, though the rear rows have poor visibility as a result of the steep slope. There is a double staircase to the balcony level from the center of the orchestra's rear section. A partial cross-aisle and a wrought-iron railing separate the orchestra's front and rear portions. There are exit doors from the partial wide aisles. Two aisles lead from the orchestra's front to the rear, connecting with the exit doors. The orchestra and its promenade contain walls with plasterwork paneling. There are arches along the orchestra's side walls, which contain shallow pilasters and moldings.

The balcony is cantilevered over the orchestra, reducing obstructed views from the rear rows of the orchestra. The balcony level is similarly divided into front and rear sections by an aisle halfway across the depth. There are decorative iron railings surrounding the double staircase from the orchestra to the balcony. The rear wall of the balcony promenade contains plasterwork panels, as at orchestra level. A technical booth is also installed on the rear wall. The plasterwork panels continue onto the walls. The balcony's underside has light fixtures, moldings, and plasterwork panels. The front railing has molded wave decorations and friezes with foliate motifs; these are obscured by light boxes.

On either side of the proscenium is a segmentally arched wall section with four boxes, arranged in two tiers. The fronts of the boxes are curved outward and contain molded wave decorations and friezes with foliate motifs. The undersides contain molded decorations with light fixtures. Above each arch is a medallion with swags.

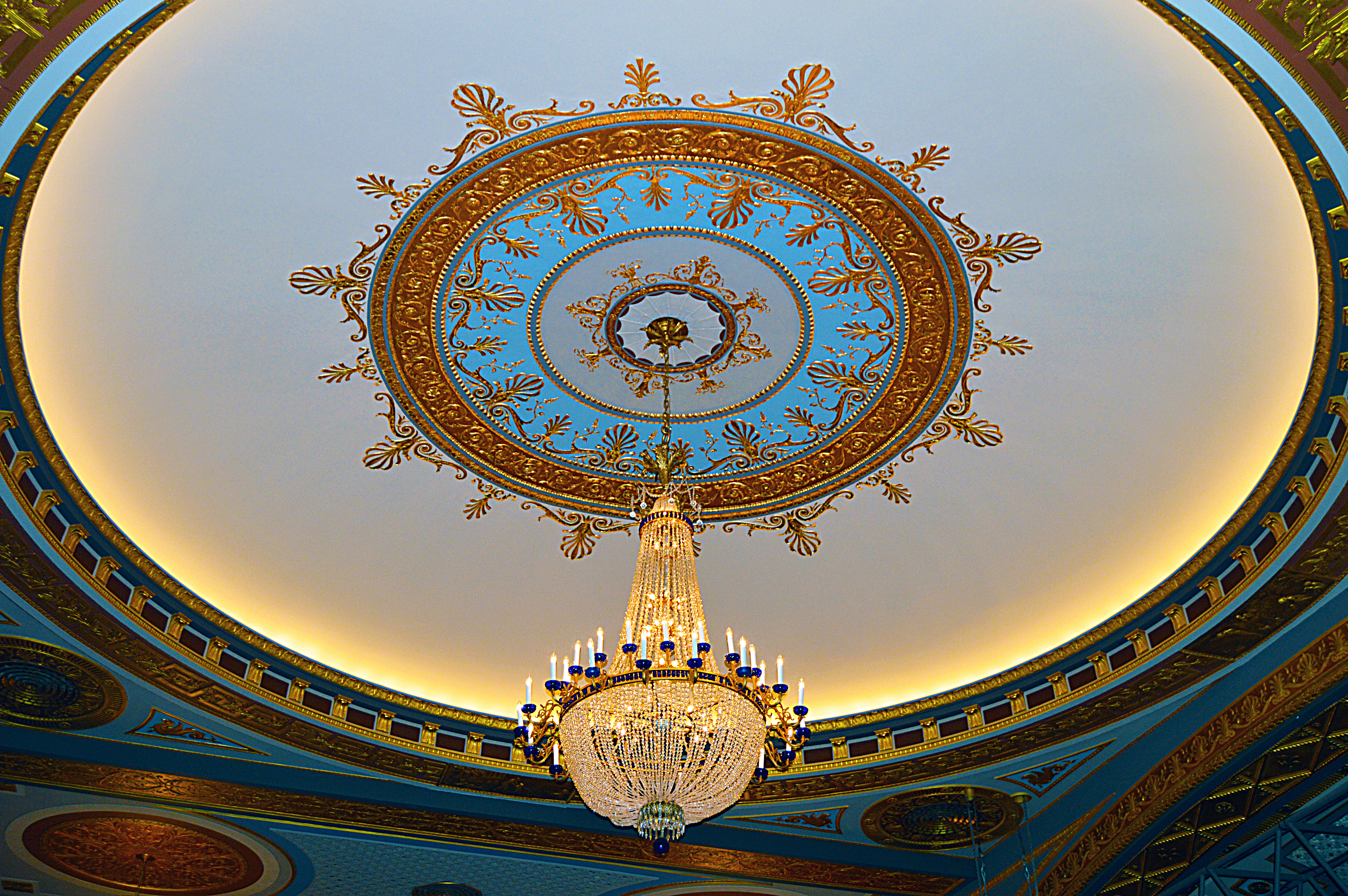
Central dome with overhanging chandelier

==== Other design features ====
Next to the boxes is an elliptical proscenium arch. The archway is surrounded by a molded rounded band, containing a motif of a spiral leaf. There is a cartouche above the middle of the proscenium. Backstage, the theater was designed with 16 private rooms and five triple-sized rooms, connected to the stage by an elevator.

A sounding board curves onto the ceiling above the proscenium arch, separated from the proscenium and the ceiling by a pair of ribs. The sounding board is decorated with low relief plasterwork and latticework. The ceiling has a shallow dome surrounded by a molded band. There are bands within the dome itself, dividing the dome's surfaces into panels. The center of the dome has a plasterwork medallion at the center, from which hangs a chandelier. The rest of the ceiling, surrounding the dome, is divided into panels by moldings. These panels contain grilles as well as medallions in low relief.

== History ==
Times Square became the epicenter for large-scale theater productions between 1900 and the Great Depression. During the 1900s and 1910s, many theaters in Midtown Manhattan were developed by the Shubert brothers, one of the major theatrical syndicates of the time. The Chanin brothers developed another grouping of theaters in the mid-1920s. Though the Chanins largely specialized in real estate rather than theaters, Irwin Chanin had become interested in theater when he was an impoverished student at the Cooper Union. He subsequently recalled that he had been "humiliated" by having to use a separate door whenever he bought cheap seats in an upper balcony level.

=== Development and early years ===
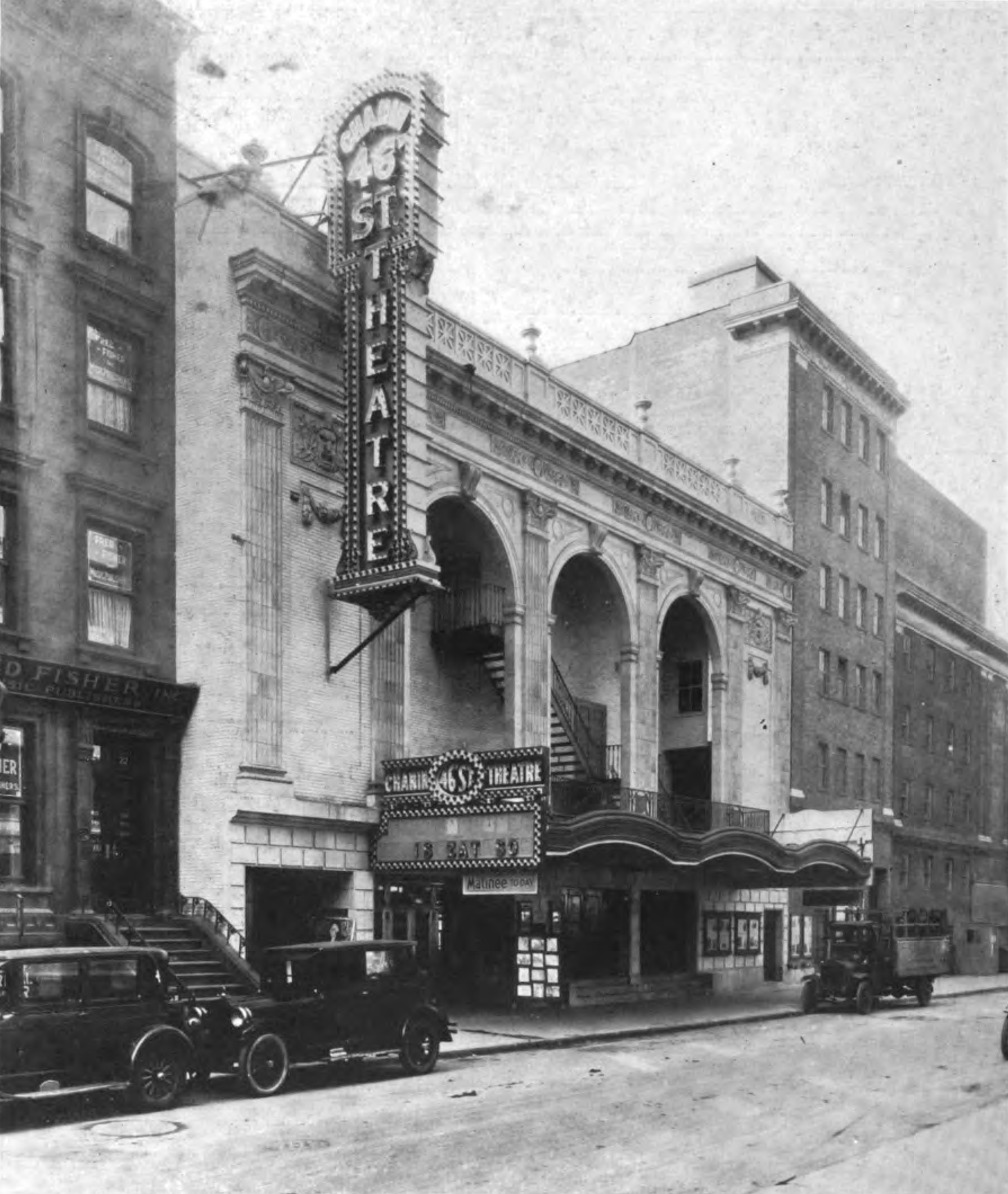
View of the 46th Street Theatre in 1925

Chanin acquired the residences at 226 to 236 West 46th Street in January 1924. Two months later, the Chanin Construction Company filed plans for the construction of a new theater on 46th Street, to cost $1.1 million. Irwin Chanin was a newcomer to the Broadway theater industry, so he hired Herbert Krapp, an experienced architect who had designed multiple Broadway theaters for the Shubert brothers. Krapp designed the theater's facade in a more ornate manner than his previous commissions. Irwin Chanin, who built the theater with his brother Henry, wished to lure visitors with architecture because they did not have the booking chain or an established reputation in the theatrical industry. The New York Times quoted Irwin as saying: "We hope with this particular theater to carry out the new modern thought in the art of the theatrical world."

The Chanins had no experience in operating theaters, and they hired Andrew J. Cobe to lease the theater to an operator. In October 1924, the Shuberts leased Chanin's 46th Street Theatre for twenty-one years at a cost of $2 million. The theater's owners received a $625,000 loan the following January, and the Chanins finalized their lease that month. Krapp designed the 46th Street Theatre with ornate decorations, including theatrical masks, in sharp contrast to simpler brick-faced theaters that he had designed for the Shuberts.

The 46th Street, as the theater was called, officially opened on February 7, 1925; its first production was Is Zat So?. (Note: Some sources cite the 1924 Greenwich Village Follies, which transferred from the Shubert Theatre and Winter Garden Theatre, as the first production. The Broadway League does not report the Greenwich Village Follies as having been staged at the 46th Street Theatre.) Most of the 46th Street's early runs consisted of shows that were transferred from other theaters, including Is Zat So?, which had transferred from the 39th Street Theatre. The Greenwich Village Follies was staged at the 46th Street in December 1925, after which Is Zat So? returned to the theater to complete its run. Following this were John Colton's The Shanghai Gesture in 1926 and an eight-week long engagement by Sacha Guitry and his wife Yvonne Printemps later that year. The Spider premiered in 1927, followed by a short run of Baby Mine. The 46th Street's first hit was Laurence Schwab's musical Good News, which opened in September 1927 and ran 551 performances. Schwab and his collaborators staged another hit in 1929, the golf-themed Follow Thru, with 401 performances. The decade ended with Top Speed, which featured Ginger Rogers in her Broadway debut.

=== 1930s to 1950s ===
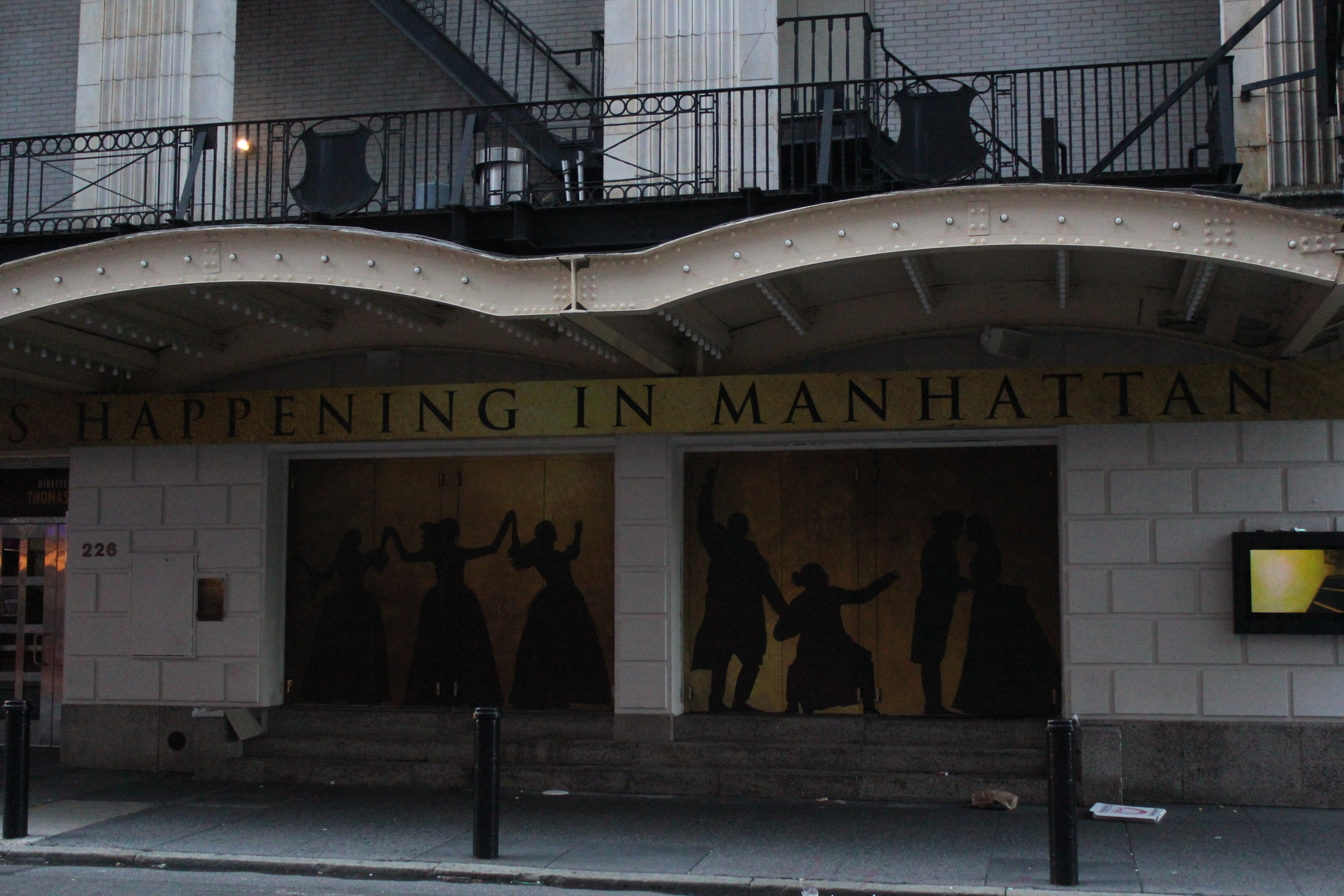
Auditorium exit detail

The early 1930s opened with two hits: the revue Sweet and Low in 1930 and You Said It the next year. With the Chanins experiencing financial trouble, the Shuberts acquired the fee to the theater's site in January 1931 for about $1.2 million. The Chanins' name was removed from the theater in 1932, and Margaret Sullavan appeared in the drama Happy Landing the same year. This was followed by two transfers: Of Thee I Sing and Autumn Crocus. The 46th Street then staged Howard Lindsay's comedy She Loves Me Not in 1933, which had 367 performances. The Farmer Takes a Wife, which opened the next year, featured Henry Fonda in his Broadway premiere alongside Margaret Hamilton. After Cole Porter's Anything Goes was staged at the 46th Street in 1935, the theater hosted short-lived productions for several years. Olsen and Johnson's hit revue Hellzapoppin opened at the 46th Street in 1938, succeeded by Porter's DuBarry Was a Lady in 1939.

Porter produced another musical, Panama Hattie, which opened in 1940 and ran for 501 performances. During the early 1940s, the 46th Street hosted productions including Junior Miss (1941), Beat the Band (1942), and Sons o' Fun (1943). Also in 1943, the United States Army staged a single performance of five plays written and performed by soldiers, which raised $100,000 for charity. One Touch of Venus appeared at the 46th Street in 1944, running 567 performances, and the hit Dark of the Moon followed the next year. The theater was sold to Robert W. Dowling's City Investing Company in early 1945, but the Shuberts successfully sued to block the City Investing Company from acquiring the theater until Dark of the Moon closed. The 46th Street's next production was a transfer of the operetta The Red Mill. Finian's Rainbow opened in 1947, ultimately running for 725 performances. A smoker's promenade opened in the adjacent alley in 1948, with murals depicting eight productions at the theater.

The theater hosted Love Life in 1948 and Regina in 1949, both produced by Cheryl Crawford. In 1950, the 46th Street Theatre hosted Arms and the Girl, featuring Nanette Fabray, for 134 performances. Frank Loesser's musical Guys and Dolls opened the same year, with about 1,200 performances over the next three years. The next production to be staged was Ondine in 1954, followed the same year by On Your Toes and The Bad Seed. The three subsequent productions at the 46th Street Theatre, from 1955 to early 1960, all featured singer and dancer Gwen Verdon, who won the Tony Award for Best Actress in a Musical for all of these productions. These were Damn Yankees in 1955, New Girl in Town in 1957, and Redhead in 1959. Three short-lived productions were staged between New Girl in Town and Redhead.

=== 1960s to 1980s ===
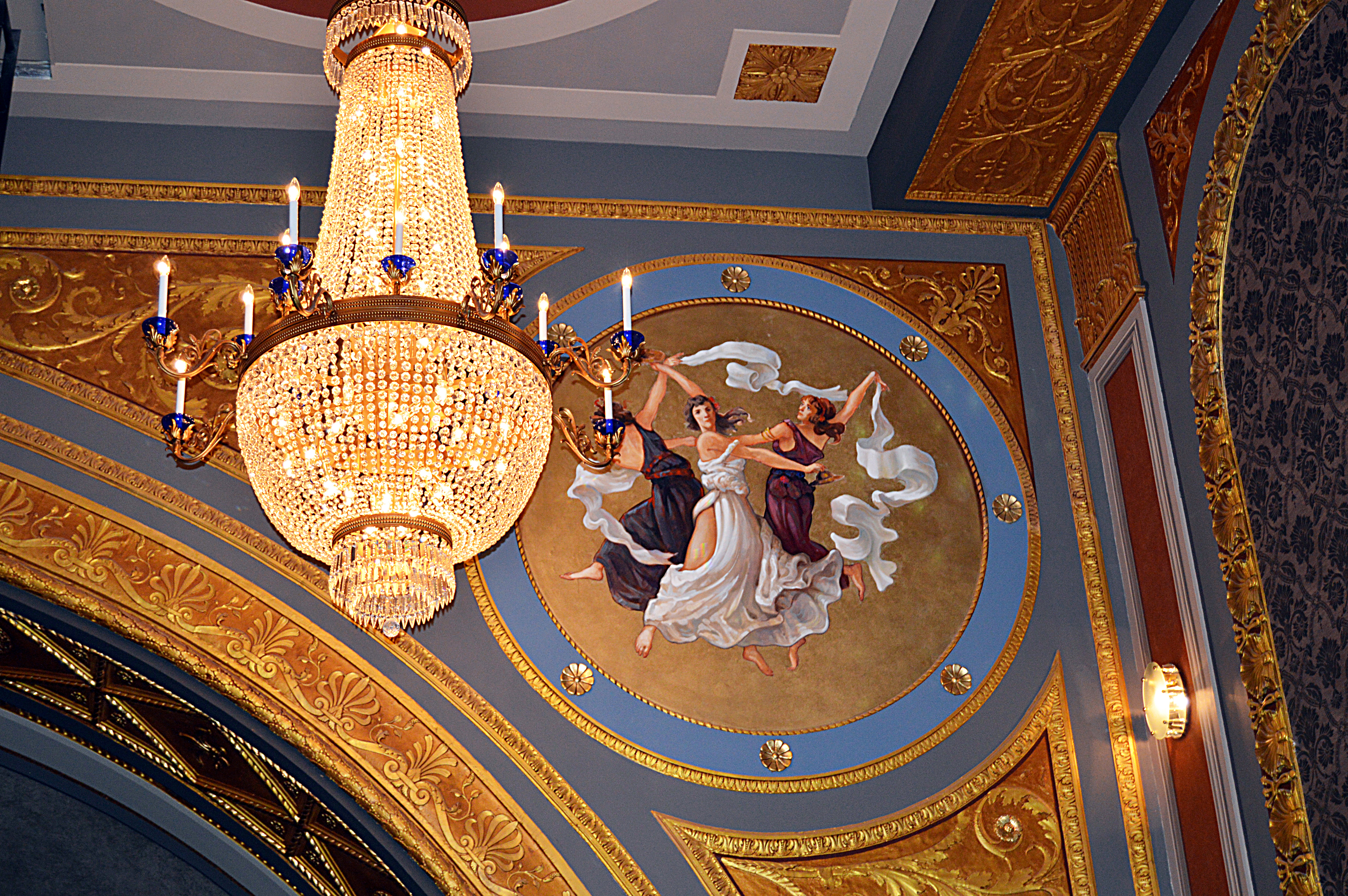
Detail of a spandrel in the auditorium

In March 1960, Lester Osterman bought the 46th Street Theatre from the City Investing Company, having already acquired the Eugene O'Neill Theatre from City Investing. After short runs of Christine and a revival of Finian's Rainbow, the theater continued to produce major musicals into that decade. These included Tenderloin, which opened in 1960 and starred Maurice Evans. The next hit was How to Succeed in Business Without Really Trying, which opened in 1961 and ran for 1,417 performances. The theater also hosted a memorial for lyricist Oscar Hammerstein II during 1962. The 46th Street then hosted Do I Hear a Waltz?, which opened in 1965 and was the only collaboration between composer Richard Rodgers and lyricist Stephen Sondheim. The theater's late-1960s hits were I Do! I Do!, a 1967 play that featured only Mary Martin and Robert Preston, and 1776, a musical that opened in 1969.

After 1776 moved to another theater, the 46th Street hosted the revival of No, No, Nanette with Ruby Keeler in 1971, which ran for 855 performances. The theater subsequently hosted Clare Boothe Luce's The Women in 1973, followed the same year by Raisin, the latter of which ran for 847 performances. Next was a revival of the Noël Coward play Private Lives in 1975; the musical Chicago was also revived later that year, lasting 898 performances. The theater hosted Working briefly in 1978, and that production's producers Stephen R. Friedman and Irwin Meyer bought Osterman's ownership stake. The 46th Street then staged The Best Little Whorehouse in Texas, an off-Broadway transfer, for 1,584 performances between 1978 and 1982.

Meyer and Friedman had placed the theater for sale by 1980, and they sought to rename the theater after Ethel Merman, but this did not happen. Both the Shubert Organization and the Nederlander Organization were interested in acquiring the theater. In 1981, the Nederlanders purchased a half-interest in the 46th Street. The musical Nine opened at the theater the next year and ran until February 1984. Jerry Weintraub also purchased a stake in the operation of the 46th Street in 1984. This was followed by Neil Simon's Brighton Beach Memoirs in 1985, then Joseph Kesselring's Arsenic and Old Lace in 1986. August Wilson's play Fences opened in 1987 and ran for 526 performances. The 46th Street then hosted revivals of Born Yesterday and The Merchant of Venice in 1989.

The New York City Landmarks Preservation Commission (LPC) started to consider protecting the 46th Street Theatre as a landmark in 1982, with discussions continuing over the next several years. The LPC designated the 46th Street's facade and interior as landmarks on November 17, 1987. This was part of the commission's wide-ranging effort in 1987 to grant landmark status to Broadway theaters. The New York City Board of Estimate ratified the designations in March 1988. The Nederlanders, the Shuberts, and Jujamcyn collectively sued the LPC in June 1988 to overturn the landmark designations of 22 theaters, including the 46th Street, on the merit that the designations severely limited the extent to which the theaters could be modified. The lawsuit was escalated to the New York Supreme Court and the Supreme Court of the United States, but the designations were ultimately upheld in 1992.

=== 1990s to present ===
On March 27, 1990, at a luncheon to benefit the New York Public Library for the Performing Arts, the Nederlanders renamed the theater to honor the composer Richard Rodgers. The first production to be staged at the renamed theater was Alexander H. Cohen and Hildy Parks's Accomplice, and the musical Oh, Kay! was revived later in 1990. The Neil Simon play Lost in Yonkers opened in 1991, ultimately running 780 performances. The Boys Choir of Harlem appeared at the Richard Rodgers in 1993, followed the same year by Fool Moon. Simon's Laughter on the 23rd Floor, which also opened in late 1993, lasted for 320 performances. How to Succeed in Business Without Really Trying returned to the Richard Rodgers in 1995 and had 548 performances. This was followed by two musicals with scores by John Kander and Fred Ebb: a revival of Chicago in 1996 and Steel Pier in 1997. During late 1997, the musical Side Show was staged at the Richard Rodgers; it flopped despite positive reviews. Conversely, Footloose opened the next year, and it ran 737 performances over two years, despite negative reviews.

Seussical, which opened in 2000, ended up closing after six months at a $10 million loss. In 2001, several Broadway performers and directors launched a celebration of Rodgers's work at the theater, a year before what would have been his 100th birthday. The same year saw the premiere of another Simon hit, 45 Seconds from Broadway. This was followed in 2002 by a run of Private Lives and a comparatively much longer run of Movin' Out, which ran for four years. The musical Tarzan appeared at the Richard Rodgers in 2006, and the theater was renovated with the addition of the Richard Rodgers Gallery, a space with to memorabilia of the composer. This was followed in 2007 by Cyrano de Bergerac, then by Lin-Manuel Miranda's musical In The Heights from 2008 to 2011. The theater's other productions of the early 2010s included Bengal Tiger at the Baghdad Zoo in 2011; Porgy and Bess and Lewis Black's Running on Empty in 2012; and Cat on a Hot Tin Roof and The Rascals: Once Upon a Dream in 2013.

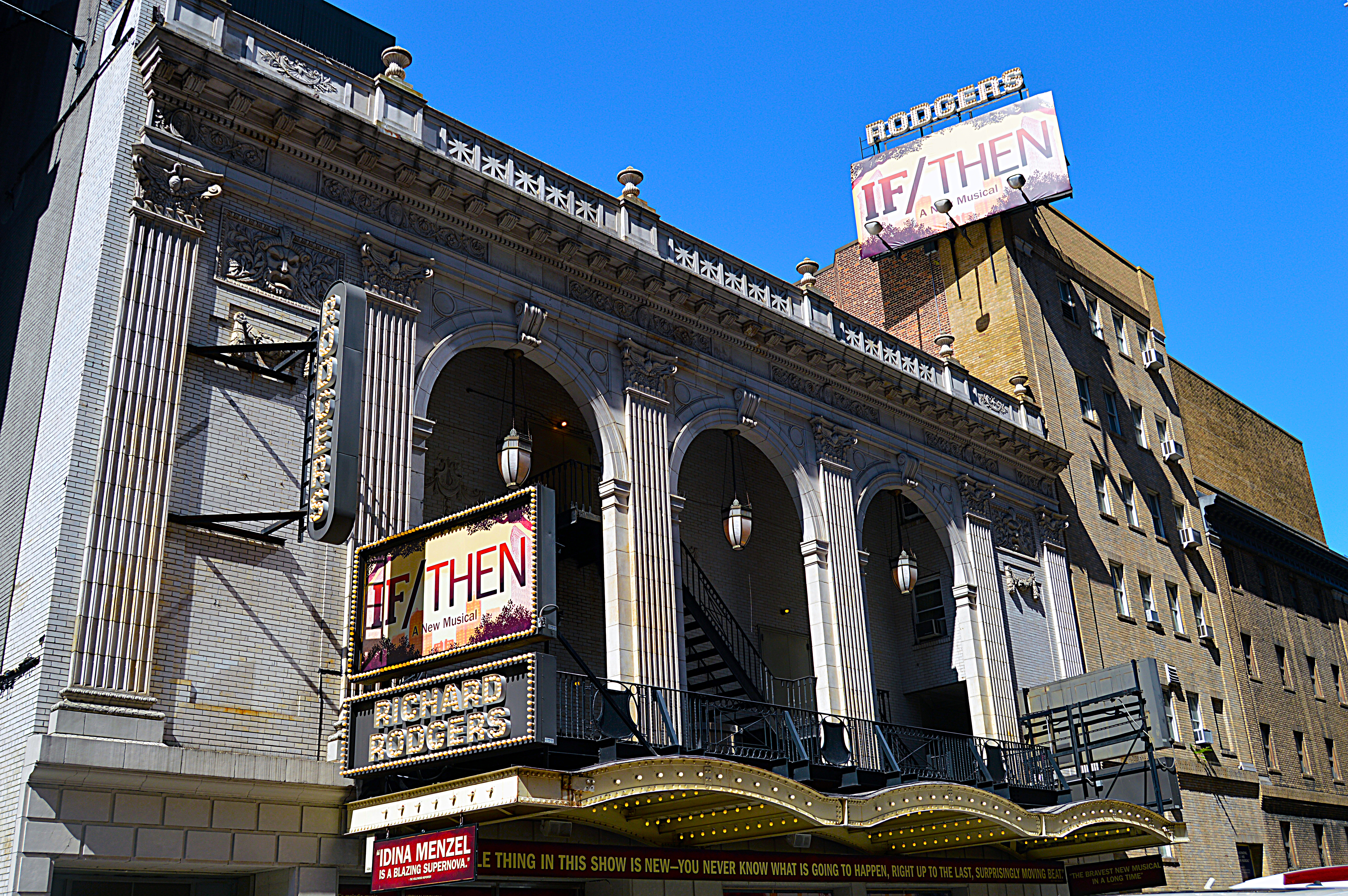
View from the east, while hosting If/Then in 2014; the stage house is visible at right

In 2013, the Richard Rodgers underwent a $3.5 million renovation conducted by EverGreene Architectural Arts. Up to 20 layers of paint were removed, and light-gray wall patterns and proscenium murals were installed. In addition, all 1,319 seats were replaced and a second arch in front of the original proscenium was removed. The first production at the renovated theater was Romeo and Juliet, which had a limited engagement; it was succeeded by If/Then in 2014. As part of a settlement with the United States Department of Justice in 2014, the Nederlanders agreed to improve disabled access at their nine Broadway theaters, including the Richard Rodgers. Miranda's musical Hamilton opened at the theater in 2015 and has performed there since then. All Broadway theaters temporarily closed on March 12, 2020, due to the COVID-19 pandemic. The Richard Rodgers reopened on September 14, 2021, with performances of Hamilton. During Hamilton's run, on October 30, 2026, the theater hosted a one-night benefit performance of the musical Rent.

== Notable productions ==
The Richard Rodgers Theatre has housed 11 Tony Award-winning Best Plays and Best Musicals, more than any other Broadway theater. In order of when the productions won, these are Guys and Dolls (1951 Best Musical), Damn Yankees (1956 Best Musical), Redhead (1959 Best Musical), How to Succeed in Business Without Really Trying (1962 Best Musical), 1776 (1969 Best Musical), Raisin (1974 Best Musical), Nine (1982 Best Musical), Fences (1987 Best Play), Lost in Yonkers (1991 Best Play), In the Heights (2008 Best Musical), and Hamilton (2016 Best Musical). Productions are listed by the year of their first performance.

=== 46th Street Theatre ===
Notable productions at the theater
Opening year	Name	Refs.
1925, 1926	Is Zat So?	
1925	Greenwich Village Follies	
1927	Good News	
1929	Follow Thru	
1930	Sweet and Low	
1931	You Said It	
1932	Of Thee I Sing	
1932	Autumn Crocus	
1933	Counsellor at Law	
1934	The Farmer Takes a Wife	
1935	Anything Goes	
1938	Right This Way	
1938	Hellzapoppin	
1939	Knickerbocker Holiday	
1939	DuBarry Was a Lady	
1940	Panama Hattie	
1941	Junior Miss	
1942	Beat the Band	
1943	Sons o' Fun	
1944	One Touch of Venus	
1945	Dark of the Moon	
1945	The Red Mill	
1947	Finian's Rainbow	
1948	Love Life	
1950	Guys and Dolls	
1954	Ondine	
1954	On Your Toes	
1954	The Bad Seed	
1955	Damn Yankees	
1957	New Girl in Town	
1958	Ages of Man	
1959	Redhead	
1960	Christine	
1960	Finian's Rainbow	
1960	Tenderloin	
1961	Donnybrook!	
1961	How to Succeed in Business Without Really Trying	
1965	Do I Hear a Waltz?	
1965	Pickwick	
1966	I Do! I Do!	
1968	The Price	
1969	1776	
1971	No, No, Nanette	
1973	The Women	
1973	Raisin	
1975	Private Lives	
1975	Chicago	
1978	Working	
1978	The Best Little Whorehouse in Texas	
1982	Nine	
1985	Brighton Beach Memoirs	
1986	Arsenic and Old Lace	
1987	Fences	
1989	Born Yesterday	
1989	The Merchant of Venice	

=== Richard Rodgers Theatre ===
Notable productions at the theater
Opening year	Name	Refs.
1990	Oh, Kay!	
1991	Lost in Yonkers	
1993	Fool Moon	
1993	Laughter on the 23rd Floor	
1994	A Christmas Carol	
1995	How to Succeed in Business Without Really Trying	
1996	Chicago	
1997	Steel Pier	
1997	Side Show	
1998	Footloose	
2000	Seussical	
2001	45 Seconds from Broadway	
2002	Private Lives	
2002	Movin' Out	
2006	Tarzan	
2007	Cyrano de Bergerac	
2008	In The Heights	
2011	Bengal Tiger at the Baghdad Zoo	
2012	Porgy and Bess	
2012	Lewis Black: Running on Empty	
2012	Cat on a Hot Tin Roof	
2013	The Rascals: Once Upon a Dream	
2013	Romeo and Juliet	
2014	If/Then	
2015	Hamilton	
2026	Rent	

== Box office record ==
Hamilton achieved the box office record for the Richard Rodgers Theatre. The production grossed $4,041,493 for the week ending December 30, 2018, with a top ticket price of $849 and 101.87% of the theatre's gross potential. Hamilton's gross for the week of December 30, 2018, was the highest-grossing week for any show in Broadway history at the time.

== See also ==
- List of Broadway theaters
- List of New York City Designated Landmarks in Manhattan from 14th to 59th Streets
