= Duncan Penwarden =

Canadian actor

Duncan Penwarden (born William Duncan Penwarden; February 9, 1880 – September 13, 1930) was a Canadian-American film and stage actor.

Penwarden was born in Mabou, British Nova Scotia, the eldest of seven siblings raised by English immigrants, Robert and Eva Penwarden. His father worked as a caretaker at a local newspaper office in Winnipeg where Duncan Pendwarden was raised before coming to America in his early twenties. Several years before his death, Penwarden applied to become a United States citizen, becoming a naturalized U.S. citizen in 1927. He died in 1930, and was survived by his Michigan-born wife, Gertrude, and their two sons.

== Filmography ==
- Laughter (1930)
- The Lady Lies (1929)
- Gentlemen of the Press (1929)
- The Bishop's Candlesticks (1929)
- The Woman God Sent (1920)
- The Imp (1919)

== Broadway roles ==
- Broken Dishes (November 5, 1929 – April 1930)
- Now-a-Days (August 5, 1929 – August 1929)
- Gentlemen of the Press (August 27, 1928 – December 1928)
- The Clutching Claw (February 14, 1928 – March 1928)
- Scalawag (March 29, 1927 – April 1927)
- The Scarlet Lily (January 29, 1927 – March 1927)
- Is Zat So? (January 5, 1925 – July 1926)

== Death ==
He died, aged 50, at his home in Jackson Heights, Queens from pneumonia, in 1930, several weeks after surgery.
