= Is Zat So? (play) =

1924 play by James Gleason and Richard Taber

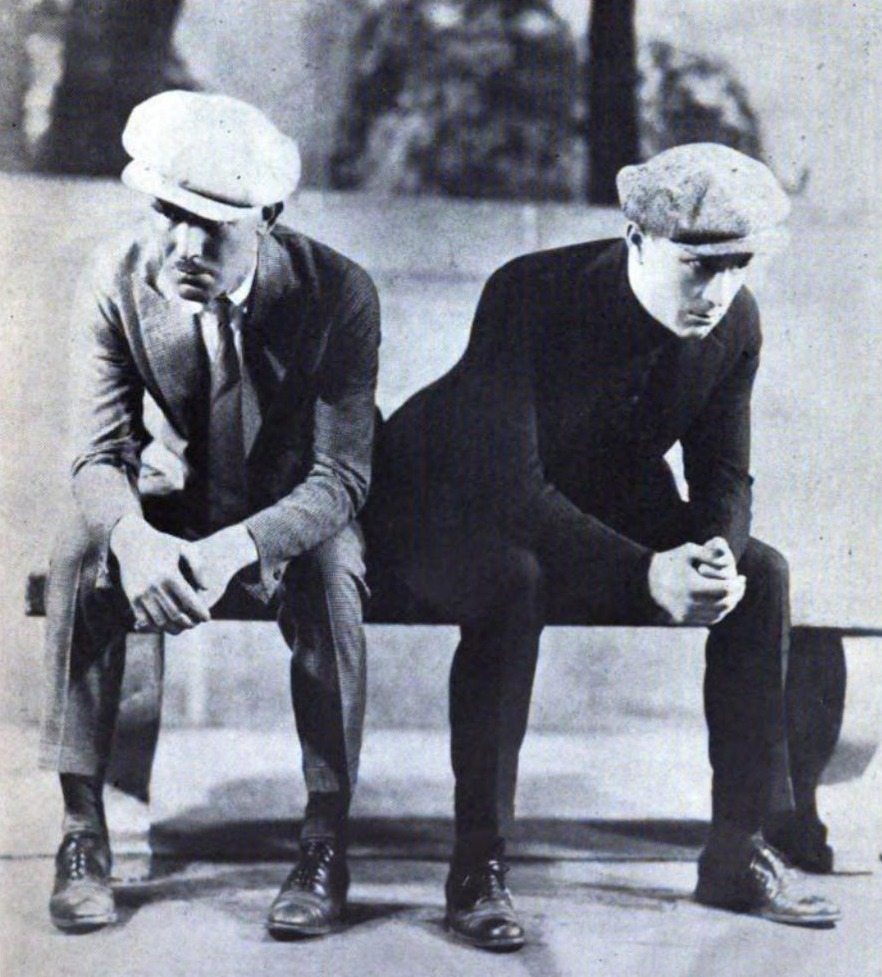
- James Gleason and Robert Armstrong
- Original title: That's That
- Original language: English
- Written by: James Gleason and Richard Taber
- Subject: Romance and boxing on Fifth Avenue
- Genre: Comedy
- Setting: A Central Park bench and a house on Fifth Avenue

Premiere
- Date: January 5, 1925 (US); February 15, 1926 (UK)
- Place: 39th Street Theatre (US); Apollo Theatre (UK)
- Directed by: Everett Butterfield
- Original run: 631 performances (US)

Is Zat So?, originally called That's That, is a 1924 play by James Gleason and Richard Taber. It is a three-act comedy with five scenes, three settings and fourteen speaking characters. The action of the play takes place over four weeks in Manhattan. The story concerns a slumping Brooklyn boxer and his manager from the Gas House, who mix with Fifth Avenue society and find themselves a pair of gals. The play was widely known for its use of New York City accents and slang, and for an onstage boxing match.

The play was produced by Earle Boothe in association with Lee Shubert and staged by Everett Butterfield. It starred actor-playwright James Gleason and Robert Armstrong. Is Zat So? had two tryouts then premiered on Broadway during January 1925. It ran eighteen months on Broadway, for 631 performances, during which secondary companies performed in Chicago, London, and other cities.

It was adapted for a 1927 silent film of the same name, now considered lost.

== Characters ==
Characters are listed in order of appearance within their scope.

Leads

- Eddie Cowan called Chick, is from Brooklyn, a slow-thinking veteran and auto mechanic turned lightweight boxer.
- A. B. Hurley called Hap, is from the Gas House, a voluble veteran and boxing manager, who discovered Chick. (Note: Pressed by Clint, Hap reveals his first two names are Alfred Bertram, but warns that anyone who uses them gets punched.)

Supporting

- C. Clinton Blackburn called Clint, is a wealthy young bachelor with a brother-in-law problem.
- Susan Blackburn Parker called Sue, is Clint's older sister, long-suffering but not bitter.
- Florence Hanley is a young woman, a nursemaid at the Parker residence, her first job.
- Marie Mestretti is Robert Parker's secretary, who soon has old dog Hap learning new tricks.

Featured

- Maurice Fitz-Stanley called Fitz, is a retired British Major, an "Honourable", fond of Sue.
- Robert Parker is Sue's caddish and abrasive husband, who manages the Blackburn estate.
- James Blackburn Parker called Jimmy, is the young son of Robert and Susan Parker.
- Grace Hobart is Sue Parker's best friend, a society woman who lives nearby.
- Fred Hobart is Grace's husband, a chronic lush and sometime pal of Parker.
- John Duffy is Grace Hobart's chauffeur, a former lightweight boxer and old school chum of Hap.

Bit Players

- Angie Van Alsten is a friend of Grace and Sue, more mentioned than present.
- Smith is a replacement butler for the Blackburns, present momentarily in the third act.
- Guests at the Blackburn's residence during Act II Scene 2.

Off Stage

- James Blackburn was Clint's twin brother, killed while with the Army Air Service in France.

== Synopsis ==
The playwrights said the park bench was on the east side of Central Park, and the house at 945 Fifth Avenue. The essential background to the plot was that Hap Hurley, Chick Cowan, Major Fitz-Stanley, Robert Parker, and James Blackburn were all present for US Soldier boxing matches staged in Paris during the Great War. During these bouts, Chick was offered 10,000 francs to take a dive but refused, while some US Government bond money was embezzled then replaced.

Act I (Scene 1: A park bench. Night, with street lamps on.) Hap berates Chick for losing today's fight when his own corner distracted him by waving a towel. They had lost a $100 forfeit the previous night, because Chick escorted a girl home who had wrenched her ankle, causing him to miss a scheduled bout. Hap is ready to send Chick back to fixing street cars where he found him, when Clint saunters by, drunk and in full evening attire. Clint wants to fight Chick as a warmup, but settles down when he hears the boys' sad story. Clint invites them back to his place for a meal, and suggests Chick and Hap live there and train him to fight. Clint will then stake Chick for his next professional bout. Hap agrees, but tells Clint "you can't train on no liquor", and the trio head for Clint's home. (Curtain)

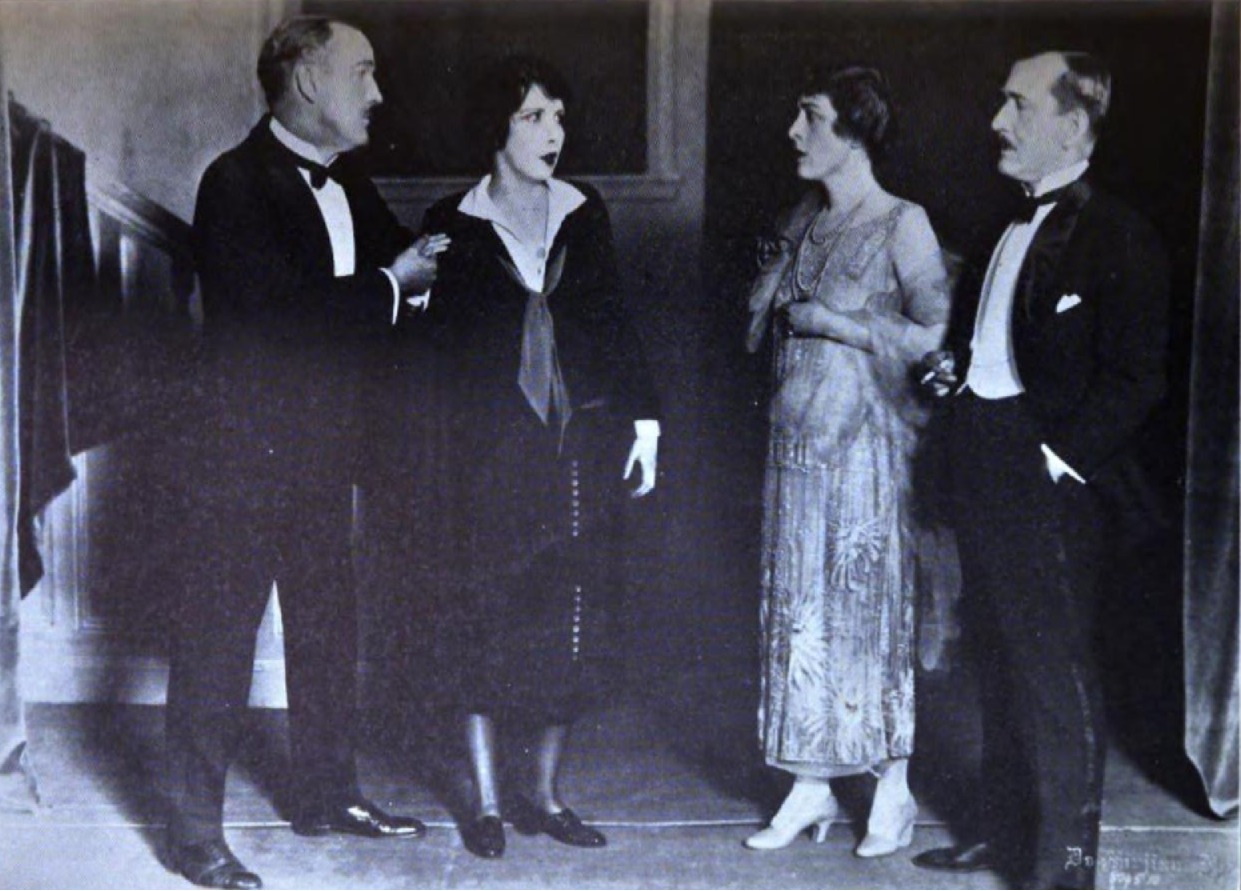

(Scene 2: A living room.) Fitz-Stanley is commiserating with Sue Parker when they surprise Marie Mestretti trying to fight off Robert Parker. Sue consoles Marie and persuades her not to quit. Sue chastises Parker, who reminds her of her late brother's embezzlement of estate funds and government bonds. He threatens scandal, but Sue knows there is only Parker's word for her brother's involvement. Clint brings home Hap and Chick to meet Sue. Dubious at first, she agrees to let them take the place of the butler and footman whom Parker had driven away. Chick discovers Florence works here as nursemaid to young James Parker; they are already acquainted. Hap encounters Marie, communicating his interest but receiving slight encouragement. When Florence limps past Hap, it hits him: "There goes our hundred dollar ankle" he tells an abashed Chick. (Curtain)

Act II (Scene 1: A sun parlor in the same house. Wednesday morning, a week later.) At breakfast, Parker remonstrates with Sue about the new servants. She dismisses his objections saying they have done wonders for Clint. Parker, seeing steel is down in the market, says "Damn" and leaves the table. Clint comes to breakfast looking splendid from training. Fitz drops in to arrange a prize fight with the lightweight champ for Chick. After some discussion with Grace and Fred Hobart, a short match is arranged for that evening between John Duffy and Chick. Sue tells Fitz her husband is cheating on her, and speculating with Blackburn estate money. Florence and Chick deepen their friendship, while Marie torments Hap, calling him Bertram whenever he lapses into slang. He finally pops the question and gets her promise to answer later. But Parker sends Marie off to retrieve envelopes from a safe deposit box for delivery to his broker. When Marie won't tell Hap about her errand for Parker, they quarrel. Hap is dejected until Chick snaps him out of it by drawing his wrath. (Quick Curtain)

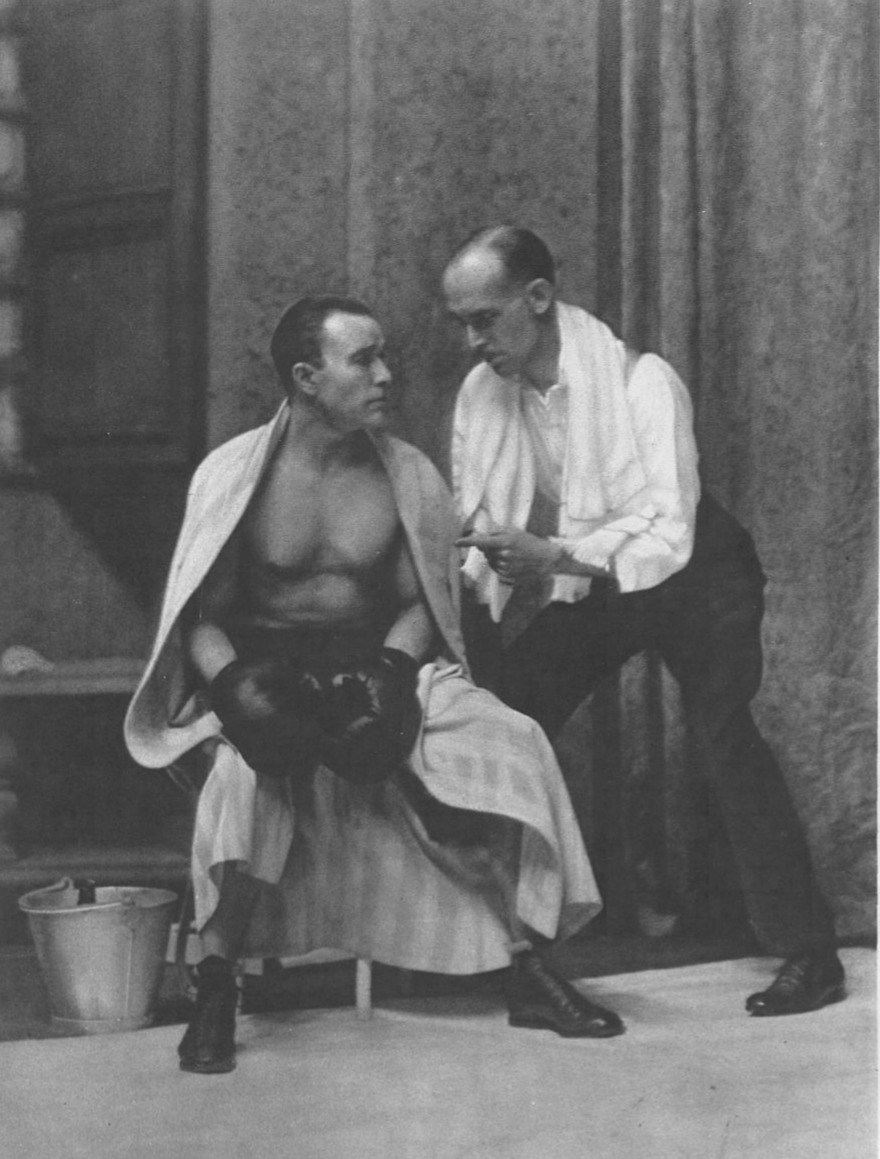

(Scene 2: Same as previous scene. That night.) Setting up the room for tonight's bout, Chick asks Florence to marry him. She says yes, but they break apart when Marie enters crying. She has tried to make up with Hap, but he won't listen, so she gives Chick a letter, saying its important, and goes home. Clint and Fitz show Chick and Hap the forfeit check for the championship bout to take place in three weeks. Hap is given Marie's letter, which he refuses to read. As the guests come in, Fitz acts as referee for the six-round match. Parker bets heavily on Duffy with Clint. Hap announces both fighters, and round one begins. Duffy is quickly in trouble, being knocked down. At the interval, he tells Parker and Fred that Chick is better than him. Parker urges Duffy to close with Chick in a clinch, then offer him money to take a dive, but Duffy refuses. During the third round Chick suddenly recognizes Parker, and yells to Hap. Distracted, Chick is unprepared for a wild blow and goes down for the count. Hap is disgusted until Chick tells him it was Parker who tried to fix the Soldier fights in Paris. Clint overhears only part of their discussion, and coupled with Parker's boast, assumes Chick has taken a dive. He tears up the forfeit check and orders them out of his house. (Curtain)

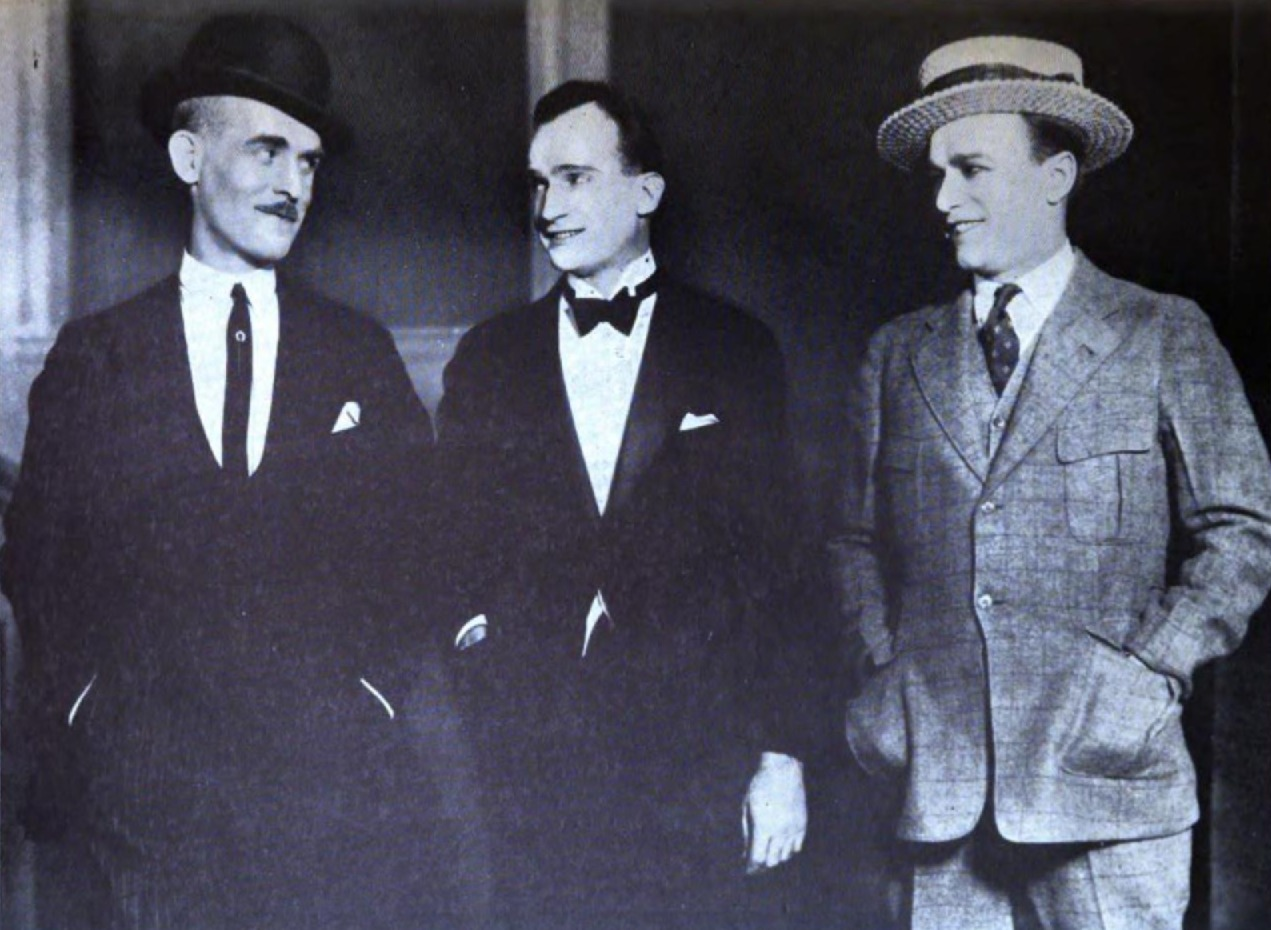

Act III (Same as Act II. Evening, three weeks later.) Sue and Grace return from having seen Chick win the lightweight championship. Florence also watched the fight, as Marie volunteered to stay with Jimmy. Fitz congratulates Grace on her winning bet, saying she has the family luck. He explains that he saw James Blackburn win tremendous sums in Paris on US Soldier boxing matches, only to donate it all to bail out a fellow who embezzled US government money. Fitz was puzzled at how Hap and Chick came up with the forfeit money for the championship fight. Grace admitted having staked them at the suggestion of John Duffy, secretly using Clint's name. Hap and Chick show up, bringing with them the cash to repay Clint. The latter is puzzled, but the misunderstandings are clarified. Soon Clint realizes Parker was the embezzler, who put the blame on James, and forced Sue to marry him for fear of scandal to her late brother's name. Hap finally succumbs to Marie's pleas for reconcilement. He reads the letter she wrote, concerning the safe deposit boxes where Parker has stashed the embezzled money. They all confront Parker, who yields the deposit box key and tacitly agrees to a divorce, in return for no prosecution. But Clint is not done with Parker; he takes him into a room from which several blows are heard coming, followed by a thud. (Quick Curtain) At rise, Clint reenters and sits in a chair, while Chick fans him with his coat and Hap rubs his arm. (Curtain)

== Original production ==
=== Background ===
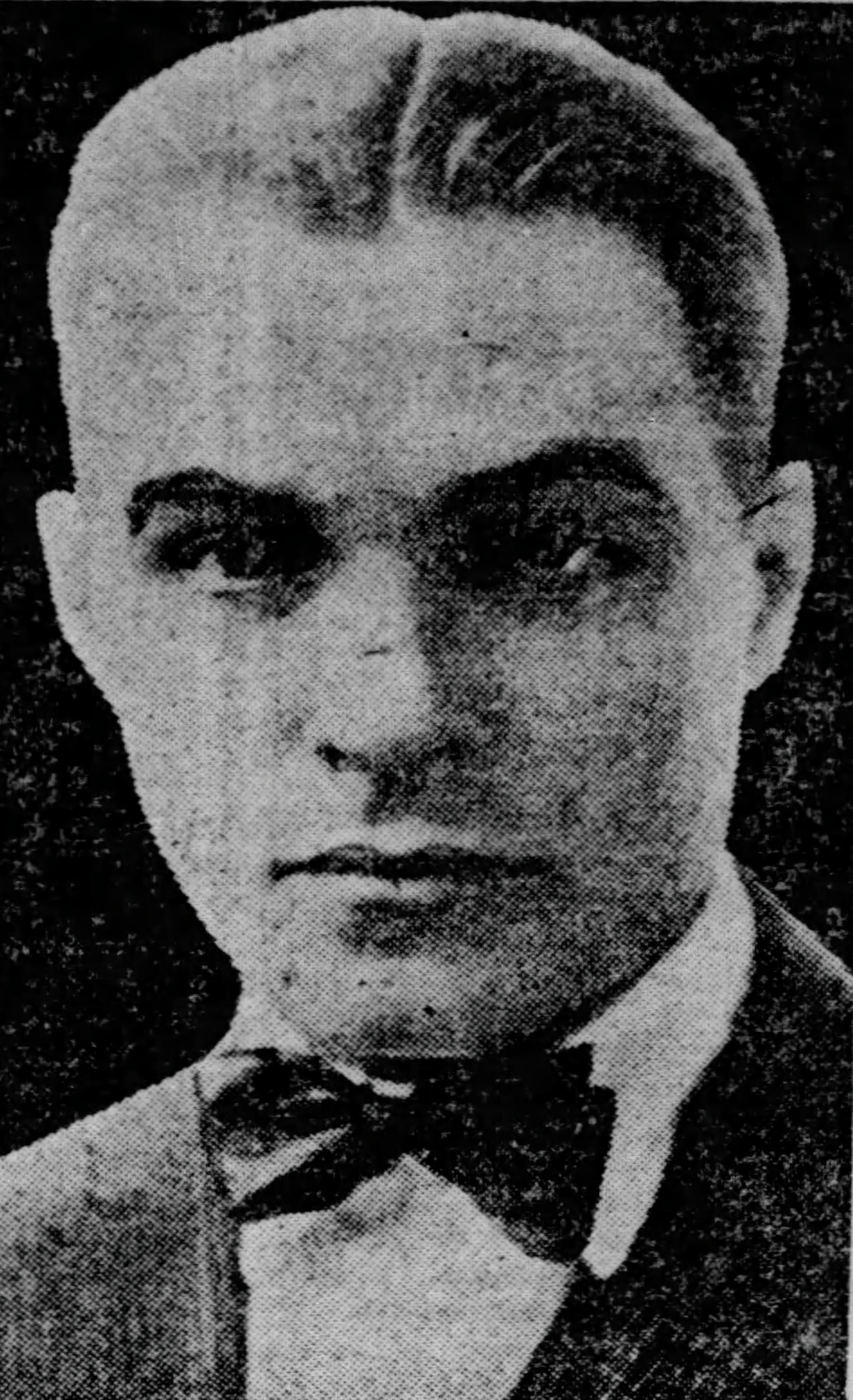
Richard Taber

The original copyright for Is Zat So? dates from 1921, when it was called That's That and ascribed to Richard Taber and James Gleason in that order. Richard Taber (1885–1957) was from Long Branch, New Jersey. He had started acting at 17, and had performed with George M. Cohan and Raymond Hitchcock over the years since. Unable to find stage work one season, Gleason and Taber decided to write their own parts, creating Is Zat So?. The role of Hap was built around Gleason while that of Chick was designed for Taber. Gleason told a London critic that he wrote the comical parts, while Taber handled the serious matters. Gleason had fought a few amateur bouts in San Francisco as a young man, but gave it up after being knocked cold by a future pro named Kid MacFadden.

They tried selling the play but found no backers, so they recruited a cast and built their own scenery, until Fanny Brice saw a rehearsal and staked them $5000 for a tryout. Eventually, Lee Shubert got involved through Earle Boothe, and a corporation was formed to hold ownership shares, with Boothe, Gleason, Taber, Brice, and Donald Gallaher all having an interest. The full cast and date of the Broadway premiere were announced by Earle Boothe on December 27, 1925. For Everett Butterfield the director, this was his last stage work. A US Army captain during World War I, he died two months after the premiere, at the age of forty.

=== Cast ===
Principal cast from the Stamford tryout through the first six months of the Broadway run.
Role	Actor	Dates	Notes and sources
Chick Cowan	Robert Armstrong	Jan 01, 1925 - Jul 31, 1926	Armstrong was the nephew of Paul Armstrong, at one time a sports columnist under the byline "Right Cross".
Hap Hurley	James Gleason	Jan 01, 1925 - Jul 31, 1926	
Clint Blackburn	Sydney Riggs	Jan 01, 1925 - Jul 31, 1926	
Sue Parker	Marie Chambers	Jan 01, 1925 - Jul 31, 1926	
Fitz-Stanley	Victor Morley	Jan 01, 1925 - Jul 31, 1926	Morley's wife Carola Parsons had the bit part of Angie Van Alsten.
Florence Hanley	Jo Wallace	Jan 01, 1925 - Jul 31, 1926	
Robert Parker	John C. King	Jan 01, 1925 - Jul 31, 1926	
Marie Mestretti	Marjorie Crossland	Jan 01, 1925 - Jul 31, 1926	
Jimmy Parker	Tom Brown	Jan 01, 1925 - Jul 31, 1926	Brown was ten-years-old when this production started.
Grace Hobart	Eleanor Parker	Jan 01, 1925 - Jul 31, 1926	She should not be confused with the much younger actress Eleanor Parker.
Fred Hobart	Duncan Penwarden	Jan 01, 1925 - Jul 31, 1926	
John Duffy	Jack Perry	Jan 01, 1925 - Jul 31, 1926	Perry was a welterweight boxer.

=== Tryouts ===
A first tryout for Is Zat So? was held in Worcester, Massachusetts in early November 1924. The New York Times printed an extract of a review from the Worcester Telegram that mentioned lightweight champion Benny Leonard as having staged the Act II bout. The only cast member mentioned was James Gleason, however, a brief report in another newspaper identified Robert Armstrong, Marie Chambers, and Donald Gallaher as also taking part.

The second tryout was a three-day run at the Stamford Theatre in Stamford, Connecticut, starting on January 1, 1925. The reviewer for the Stamford Advocate said: "Called an American comedy. it really is a comedy of New York, which has a language of its own". Further, "the play never shocks but every minute is amusing". They felt the slang was acceptable, because it was neither coarse nor profane, and predicted success for it in New York.

=== Broadway premiere and reception ===
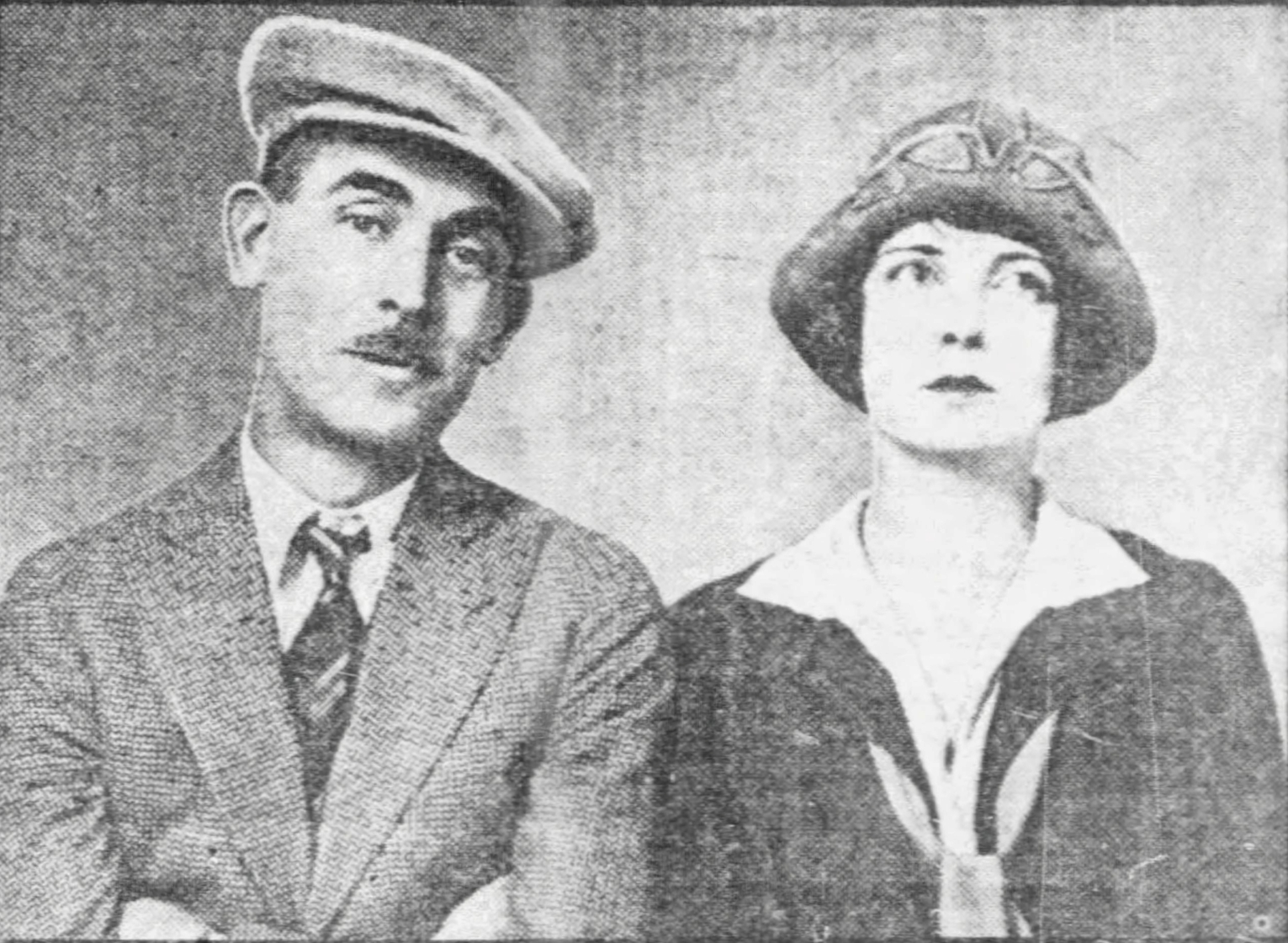

“Now at last a brilliant team, James Gleason and Robert Armstrong, have given us the real article. For rich, native humor their dialogue is the best thing in the theatre for a long, long while...” — Robert Littell on Is Zat So?

Is Zat So? had its Broadway premiere on January 5, 1925, at the 39th Street Theatre. The reviewer for The Brooklyn Daily Times said the first scene was weak and the curtain slow to rise on the second scene. They judged James Gleason and Victor Morley as Fitz-Stanley the best performers, Sydney Riggs as Clint an unconvincing inebriate, while the play itself was funnier than any other comedy that season and "a huge success". The Brooklyn Daily Eagle critic said Is Zat So? has "three rounds of the most convincing leather pushing ever fought behind footlights" and that "into this piece has been written a rare brand of humor-- in the New Yorkese manner-- which is quite irresistible".

A dissenting view came from The Brooklyn Standard Union, which reported the first scene went well while the rest of the play "soon drifted into implausible melodrama". Burns Mantle, though he considered it farce, wrote that the best part of the play was its fidelity to the characters, concluding "Actors, through Earl Boothe, have produced and financed 'Is Zat So?'. Actors wrote it, and an actor, Everett Butterfield, staged it. It is therefore, a bit of a players' triumph". Even so, Mantle chose James Gleason's other new play, The Fall Guy over Is Zat So? when compiling his Best Plays of 1924-1925.

The New York Times reviewer said the play, though "broadly amusing", was written entirely for the two main characters, and when they were not on the play "might be described as pretty bad. So too, is some of the accessory acting". Robert Littell in The New Republic thought "The play itself is too complicated, and quite feeble", but that it was worth seeing over again for the conversational interplay between Gleason and Armstrong.

=== Change of venue ===
From the 39th Street Theatre, the production moved to the brand new 46th Street Theater, starting Saturday, February 7, 1925. The new venue had twice the seating capacity (1500) of the 39th Street Theatre (675), and used rising tier seating, enabling good viewing from anywhere in the house.

The production reached its 200th performance on June 29, 1925, having stayed open during the summer. It was reported to have the highest grossing box office for any non-musical production on Broadway. During the same month it was reported that the asking price for film rights to Is Zat So? was $150,000.

=== Second company ===
A second company opened Is Zat So? on February 22, 1925, at the Adelphi Theatre in Chicago. Co-author Richard Taber played Chick Cowan and Frank Otto took the role of Hap Hurley, while Taber's wife Mary Ellen Hanley played his stage interest, Florence Hanley. Reviewer Frederick Donaghey said it was the first successful play with a boxer as protagonist he could recall, and that Chick Cowan "is the Sancho Panza to the Don of his manager and trainer". He liked Frank Otto's performance as Hap Hurley, but thought Taber's part and the rest of the production could benefit from faster pacing. Claudia Cassidy called it "The funniest show in town", while Ashton Stevens said it was funnier than Abie's Irish Rose, both of which testimonials the producers were quick to incorporate in publicity.

=== Broadway closing ===
Is Zat So? closed at the 46th Street Theatre on July 31, 1926, after 631 performances. (Note: Including the 630 count from the New York Daily News feature "The Golden Dozen", plus the last evening performance. There was no matinee on the last day.) Besides the current Broadway production company, which sailed for an Australian engagement, there were still five companies performing the work in other cities including London.

== West End premiere ==
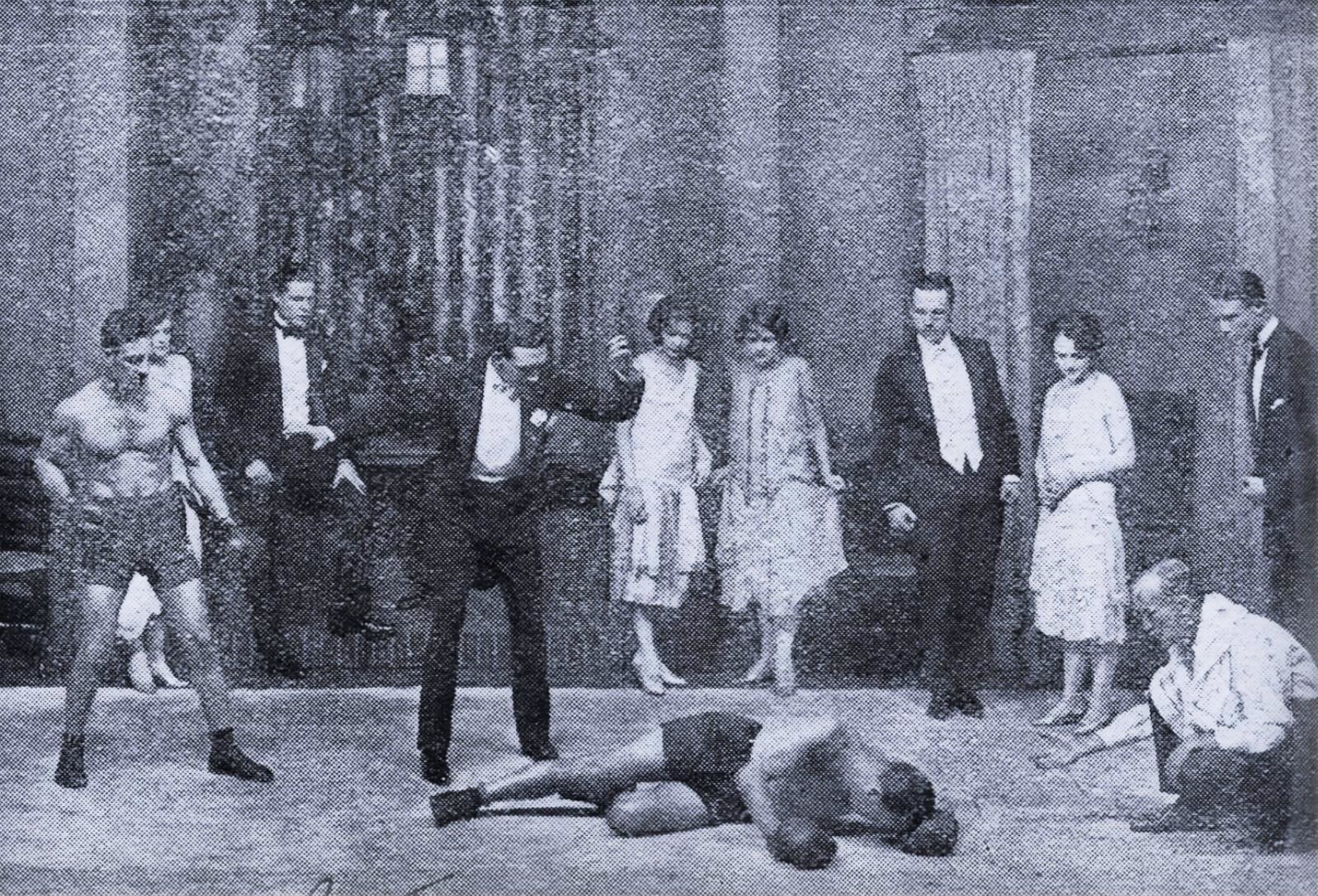

James Gleason and Robert Armstrong took Is Zat So? to the West End, with a premiere on February 15, 1926, at the Apollo Theatre. Besides the leads, other original cast members who performed in London were Marjorie Crossland, Jo Wallace, and Jack Perry. Also making up the cast were Anthony Bushell as Clint, Amy Brandon Thomas as Sue, George Relph as Fitz, and George Curzon as Parker. An American glossary was included with the programme, though one reviewer said the concept had been tried before and led inevitably to being three jokes behind during the play.

London critics were enthusiastic about the play, one calling it "easily the most amusing show in town", while another said that as much of it that could be understood through the Americanisms was "genuinely funny", not least to the skillful acting of James Gleason and Robert Armstrong. Gleason himself expressed surprised gratification at the appreciation London audiences had for the play.

== Adaptations ==
=== Film ===
- Is Zat So? (1927) Silent film, directed by Alfred E. Green and produced by William Fox, starred George O'Brien as Chick Cowan and Edmund Lowe as Hap Hurley. Edmund Lowe and James Gleason had been teammates for football and baseball at Santa Clara University.

== Bibliography ==
- Burns Mantle (ed). The Best Plays of 1924-1925. Small, Maynard, & Company, 1925.
- James Gleason and Richard Taber. Is Zat So: A Comedy in Three Acts. Samuel French, 1928.
