= Trude Rittmann =

American classical composer

Gertrud Rittmann (24 September 1908 – 22 February 2005) was a German Jewish composer, musical director, arranger and orchestrator who lived and worked for much of her life in the United States. Her career particularly flourished with major successes in Broadway theater.

== Early years ==
Trude Rittmann was born in Mannheim, Germany, and began piano lessons at age eight. She studied with Ernst Toch and Hans Bruch at the Hochschule für Musik Köln, and graduated in 1932, already noted as a promising composer. Rittmann fled Germany in 1933, and worked in France, Belgium and England, and in 1937 settled in the United States. Her mother and sister escaped Germany as well, but her father died in prison under the Nazis.

== Career ==
In New York Rittmann was hired by Lincoln Kirstein as a concert accompanist and pianist for George Balanchine's American Ballet Caravan. She later became musical director, touring with them for four years and working with composers including Leonard Bernstein, Virgil Thomson, Aaron Copland and Marc Blitzstein.

In 1941 Rittmann and Stefan Wolpe composed the music for the film Palestine at War, made by the Palestine Labour Commission. Also in 1941 Rittmann took a position with Agnes de Mille as concert accompanist, and in 1943 did the arrangements for her choreography in the Kurt Weill/Ogden Nash musical One Touch of Venus. Rittmann went on to work on many musicals as orchestrator including Finian's Rainbow (1947), Gentlemen Prefer Blondes (1949), Peter Pan (1950 musical by Leonard Bernstein), Fanny (1954) and Peter Pan (1954 musical by Moose Charlap and Jule Styne) (1954). She also worked closely with composer Frederick Loewe on the shows Paint Your Wagon (1951), My Fair Lady (1959) and Camelot (1960).

Working on Carousel (1945), she began a long association with composer Richard Rodgers, and went on to provide arrangements on South Pacific (1949), The King and I (1951) (for which she composed the ballet "Small House of Uncle Thomas") and The Sound of Music (1959) for which she devised the extended vocal sequence for "Do-Re-Mi". According to assistant conductor Peter Howard, the heart of the number – in which Maria assigns a musical tone to each child, like so many Swiss bell ringers – was devised in rehearsal by Rittmann (who was credited for choral arrangements) and choreographer Joe Layton. The fourteen note and tune lyric – "when you know the notes to sing ..." – were provided by Rodgers and Hammerstein; the rest, apparently, came from Rittmann. Howard: "Rodgers allowed her to do whatever she liked. When we started doing the staging of it, Joe took over. He asked Trude for certain parts to be repeated, certain embellishments." Rittmann retired in 1976 and died of respiratory failure in Lexington, Massachusetts. Her music has been issued on Great Performances (1972).

== Compositions and Arrangements ==
- Adagio
- Carousel - Dance Arrangements
- Finian's Rainbow - Dance Arrangements
- Brigadoon - Musical Assistant to Agnes de Mille
- Allegro - Dance Arrangements
- Look, Ma, I'm Dancin'! - Ballet Arrangements
- Gentlemen Prefer Blondes - Dance Arrangements
- Peter Pan - Dance Arrangements
- South Pacific - Assistant to Richard Rodgers
- Miss Liberty -"Train" Dance Arrangement
- Out of this World - Incidental Music
- Dayenu : folk song
- Dayeynu
- The King and I - Ballet Arrangements
- Paint Your Wagon - Dance Arrangements
- The Climate of Eden - Incidental Music
- The Girl in Pink Tights - Ballet Arrangements
- The cherry tree legend : for baritone and soprano soli, mixed chorus (SATB) and piano
- My Fair Lady - Dance Arrangements
- A suite of moods : for piano solo
- The Sound of Music - Choral Arrangements
- Christine - Dance and Vocal Arrangements
- Camelot - Dance and Choral Arrangements
- A Canticle of Carols. For women's voices
- Hot Spot - Dance and Vocal Arrangements
- Jennie - Dance and Vocal Arrangements
- Darling of the Day - Dance Arrangements
- Maggie Flynn - Dance Arrangements
- Come Summer - Vocal Arrangements
- Two By Two - Dance and Vocal Arrangements
- Ambassador - Dance Arrangements
- Gigi - Dance Arrangements
- Four Marys
- Sh'tu haadarim
