= Gentlemen of the Press (play) =

1928 play by Ward Morehouse

- Written by: Ward Morehouse
- Original language: English
- Subject: Journalism
- Genre: Comedy

Premiere
- Date premiered: August 27, 1928
- Place premiered: Henry Miller's Theatre

Gentlemen of the Press is a three-act play written by Ward Morehouse. Producers Thomas E. Jackson and H. S. Kraft opened it on Broadway at Henry Miller's Theatre on August 27, 1928. George Abbott directed the production, which ran for 128 performances.

The play is a comedy about Wick Snell, a journalist who decides to take a job as a publicist for a real estate firm. After a dispute with his new boss, Snell goes back to journalism.

Morehouse was a journalist who had worked for several different newspapers. The main character in Gentlemen of the Press was inspired by one of his co-workers who frequently complained about the difficulties of working in journalism.

== Cast and characters ==
The characters and opening night cast from the Broadway production are given below:

Opening night cast
Character	Broadway cast
Wick Snell	John Cromwell
Charlie Haven	Hugh O'Connell
Myra May	Helen Flint
Braddock	Granville Bates
Ted Hanley	Paul Clare
Sweezer	Elmer Cornell
Riggs	Harry Cronk
Bellflower	Russel Crouse
Ollie Wilkins	J. Hammond Dailey
Haley	Harold Grau
Western Union Messenger	Louis Halprin
Night Porter	A. O. Huhn
Second Waiter	George Humbert
Pansy True	Carlotta Irwin
Dorothy Snell	Betty Lancaster
Cutler	Lawrence Leslie
Alonzo	Harry Levian
First Waiter	Thomas A. Linker
McBee	Millard Mitchell
Britt	Allan Nagle
Pop Blalock	John Paschall
Kelly	William Pawley
Abner Pennyfather	Duncan Penwarden
McManahan	Francis Pierlot
Copy Boy	Billy Quinn
Vickery	George Spelvin, Jr.
Kenner	J. H. Stoddart
Fitzgerald	Cornelius Vezin
Branch	Philip Wood

== Adaptations ==
Paramount Pictures adapted the play as a film of the same name in 1929, directed by Millard Webb. Walter Huston starred as Snell.
