= The Imp (1919 film) =

1919 film by Robert Ellis

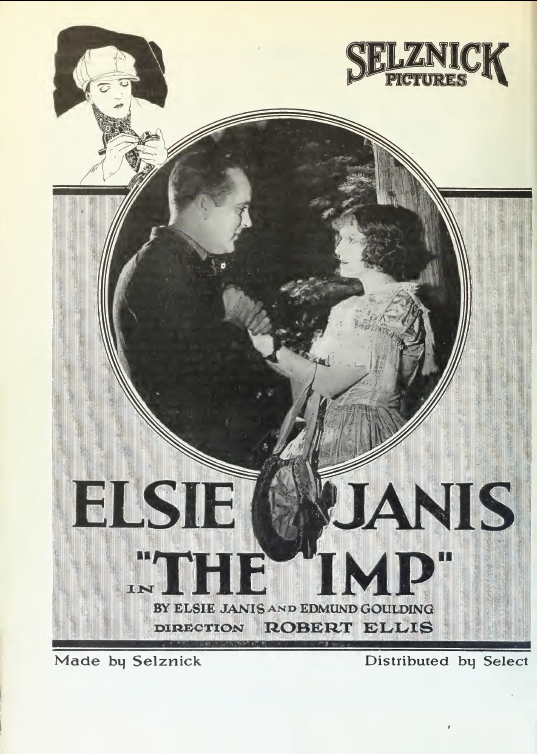
- Directed by: Robert Ellis
- Written by: Elsie Janis; Edmund Goulding
- Starring: Elsie Janis; Joe King; Ethel Stewart
- Production company: Selznick Pictures
- Distributed by: Select Pictures
- Release date: February 15, 1919
- Running time: 60 minutes
- Country: United States
- Language: Silent (English intertitles)

The Imp is a 1919 American silent crime film directed by Robert Ellis and starring Elsie Janis, Joe King, and Ethel Stewart.

== Cast ==
- Elsie Janis as Jane Morgan
- Joe King as The Leopard
- Ethel Stewart as Jane's Mother
- E. J. Ratcliffe as Jane's Father
- Duncan Penwarden as Dr. James
- Arthur Marion as The Butler
- John Sutherland as The Deacon
- William Frederic as The Warden
- Edith Forrest as Maid
- Joseph Granby as Hampden
- Jack Ridgeway as Comedian
- Ricardo Cortez as Extra

== Bibliography ==
- Anthony Slide. The Encyclopedia of Vaudeville. University Press of Mississippi, 2012.
