= Sammy Fain =

American composer (1902–1989)

Background information
- Born: Samuel E. Feinberg; June 17, 1902; New York City, New York, United States
- Died: December 6, 1989 (aged 87) Los Angeles, California, United States
- Genres: Popular music
- Occupations: Composer; vocalist; musician
- Instrument: Piano

Sammy Fain (born Samuel E. Feinberg; June 17, 1902 – December 6, 1989) was an American composer of popular music. In the 1920s and early 1930s, he contributed numerous songs that form part of The Great American Songbook, and to Broadway theatre.

== Early life and collaborations ==
Sammy Fain was born in New York City, to a family that was deeply rooted in the world of show business. His uncle, for instance, Willie Howard, was a Vaudeville performer. As a young man, Fain taught himself to play the piano. Although he couldn't read music well, he had a natural talent for coming up with memorable melodies in the spur of the moment. In 1925, he composed his first piece: "Nobody Knows What a Red-headed Mama Can Do."

Until 1942, Fain worked extensively in collaboration with Irving Kahal. In the late 1920s, they created works including "Wedding Bells are Breaking Up That Old Gang of Mine" and "Let a Smile Be Your Umbrella." Fain and Kahal also collaborated to write pieces for the play Right This Way, such as "I Can Dream, Can't I?" and "I'll Be Seeing You." The latter was especially popular during WWII, as it perfectly reflected the feelings of many American wives whose husbands were off fighting.

== Film works ==
Fain also composed music for more than 30 films in the 1930s, 1940s and 1950s. He was nominated for the Academy Award for Best Original Song ten times. Of those ten nominations, two of the pieces were selected as winning works: "Secret Love" from Calamity Jane won in 1953, and "Love Is a Many-Splendored Thing" won in 1955. Both of these pieces were co-written with lyricist Paul Francis Webster, another long-time collaborator. Fain also contributed to the song scores for the Walt Disney animated films Alice in Wonderland, Peter Pan, and The Rescuers (the latter, soon to be his last effort, also earned him another Oscar nomination).

== Further recognitions ==
In 1972, he was inducted into The Songwriters Hall of Fame.

== Death ==
Fain died from a heart attack in Los Angeles, California and was interred at Cedar Park Cemetery, in Emerson, New Jersey.

== Work on Broadway ==
- Everybody's Welcome (1931) - musical - composer
- Right This Way (1938) - musical - featured songwriter for "I'll Be Seeing You"
- Hellzapoppin' (1938) - revue - co-composer and co-lyricist
- George White's Scandals of 1939 (1939) - revue - composer
- Boys and Girls Together (1940) - revue - composer
- Sons o' Fun (1941) - revue - co-composer and co-lyricist
- Toplitzky of Notre Dame (1946) - musical - composer
- Alive and Kicking (1950) - revue - co-composer
- Flahooley (1951) - musical - composer
- Ankles Aweigh (1955) - musical - composer
- Catch a Star (1955) - revue - co-composer
- Ziegfeld Follies of 1957 (1957) - revue - featured songwriter for "An Element of Doubt"
- Christine (1960) - musical - composer
- Something More! (1964) - musical - composer
- Rock 'N Roll! The First 5,000 Years (1982) - revue - featured songwriter for "Love Is a Many-Splendored Thing"
- Swing! (1999) - revue - featured songwriter for "I'll Be Seeing You"
- Calamity Jane (2018) - musical - composer (first full staging in the NYC area)
