= Ward Morehouse =

American dramatist

- Born: November 24, 1895; Savannah, Georgia, U.S.
- Died: December 7, 1966 (aged 71); New York City, U.S.
- Occupations: Writer, theater critic, playwright, columnist, author

Ward Morehouse (November 24, 1895 – December 7, 1966) was an American theater critic, newspaper columnist, playwright, and author.

== Life and career ==
Born in Savannah, Georgia, Ward Morehouse first worked as a reporter for The Savannah Press and The Atlanta Journal. He arrived in New York City in 1919 and wrote for The New York Tribune, and The Herald Tribune. In 1926, he began writing the Broadway After Dark column for the New York Sun. He remained at the Sun for 25 years where he was also a drama critic and roving correspondent. When the Sun stopped publishing in 1950, Morehouse continued writing "Broadway After Dark" until his death, first at the New York World-Telegram and Sun, then for the Newhouse newspapers and the General Features Syndicate.

Morehouse, who was best known for his dynamic interviews with theater celebrities, organized his own theater company when he was a teenager. As an adult he wrote three plays: Miss Quis, which ran for 37 performances at the Henry Miller Theatre in 1937; Gentlemen of the Press (1928) which ran for 128 performances and was made into a film in 1929; and U.S. 90, from 1941.

In the early 1930s Morehouse worked in Hollywood as a screenwriter for the films Central Park (1932), Big City Blues (1932) (both starring Joan Blondell), and It Happened in New York (1935).

In 1932 Morehouse married the New York theatrical producer Jean Dalrymple. The marriage ended in divorce five years later, as Morehouse was thought to have had numerous infatuations and side relationships with many of his cast members. Morehouse's rather promiscuous behaviour may have also been the primary reason for the lack of longevity in his future marriages.

Morehouse was a world traveler who drove across the United States over 23 times and visited 80 foreign countries in search of stories and interviews with such personalities as Sergeant Alvin York, Eugene O'Neill, Christopher Fry, H. L. Mencken, "Alfalfa Bill" Murray, and Shoeless Joe Jackson. Morehouse stayed in so many hotels that he was quoted as saying his epitaph should read "room service, please."

During World War II, Morehouse traveled on a US Navy destroyer, and went to London and Paris to write columns called "Atlantic After Dark", "London After Dark", and "Paris After Dark". The stories he wrote in 1946, called "Report on America", received an award from the Society of the Silurians, a prestigious journalism organization.

Fond of a good meal and a good drink, his favorite interview location was the 21 Club in New York. The slightly overweight Morehouse was one of several newspapermen who took lunch regularly at Sardi's. The lunch group, who referred to themselves as "The Cheese Club", included Walter Winchell. In 1949, Time magazine referred to Morehouse as "the New York Sun's pudgy, pungent drama critic and columnist."

Morehouse was married four times and had two children, a daughter and a son, with Broadway actress Joan Marlowe. Ward Morehouse III also became a drama critic and writer. Like his father, he tried his hand at playwriting, co-writing a play entitled If It was Easy.

Ward Morehouse died in New York City at the age of 71, and is buried in Statesboro, Georgia.

== Works ==
- ... Forty-five Minutes Past Eight (The Dial Press, 1939)
- American Reveille: The United States at War (Putnam, 1942)
- George M. Cohan, Prince of the American Theater (J. B. Lippincott Company, 1943)
- Matinee Tomorrow: Fifty Years of Our Theater (Whittlesey House, 1949)
- Just the Other Day: From Yellow Pines to Broadway (McGraw-Hill, 1953)
