= Edwards Davis =

American actor, producer, and playwright (1873–1936)

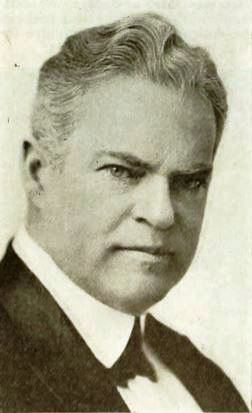
- Born: Cader Edwards Davis; June 17, 1873; Santa Clara, California, U.S.
- Died: May 16, 1936 (aged 62); Hollywood, California, U.S.
- Occupation: Actor
- Spouses: Magaret Kingore (m. 1898; div. 1900) Adele Blood (m. 1906; div. 1914) Jule Power (died 1932) Elvina Derby (m. 1934–1936)

Signature
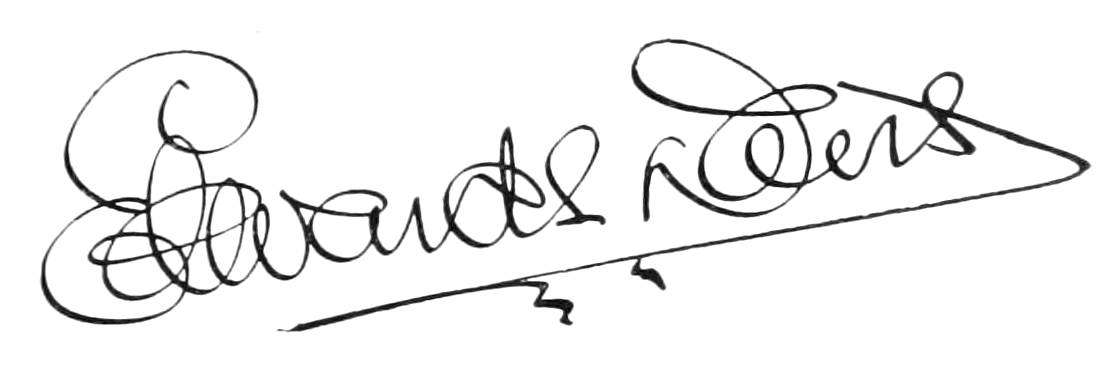

Cader Edwards Davis (June 17, 1873 – May 16, 1936) was an American actor, producer, and playwright of vaudeville and the silent film era, known as a character actor. Born and raised in the San Francisco Bay Area, he was an ordained Christian minister and first achieved prominence as a sensational orator and lecturer, becoming known as the "poet-preacher" and the "Talmage of the West", before leaving the pulpit for an acting career. He wrote and starred in several original plays and vaudeville sketches, and appeared in over 50 films. In New York he was a president of the National Vaudeville Artists Association and the Green Room Club. In Hollywood he was a founder and president of the Masonic 233 Club. He was married to several actresses, including Adele Blood, who also appeared in some of his productions.

== Early years and ministry ==
Cader Edwards Davis (Note: Davis is also sometimes known as Edward Davis, Cader Russell Davis, and J. Edwards Davis.) was born June 17, 1873, in Santa Clara, California, and raised in nearby Oakland. (Note: Sources differ on his year of birth: it is stated as 1867 in Stage Deaths (1991), and Silent Film Necrology (1995) and Internet Broadway Database. and as 1873 in Who's Who in Music and Drama (1914), and an Overland Monthly article. His age at death is recorded as 65 in contemporary obituaries. However, His age is recorded as 7 in the 1880 U.S. Census, and as 25 in a January 1899 news article. Davis himself wrote he left his former profession (as preacher) before age 25.) His father, William Wallace Davis, was a noted agriculturalist, and his brother Gideon became an advertising executive and editor of the Oakland Herald. He attended Washington College before earning an M.A. at the University of Kentucky. (Note: Cader Davis of Oakland, Cal., is listed as a student in the Kentucky University College of the Bible in 1891–92 and 1892–93 sessions.)

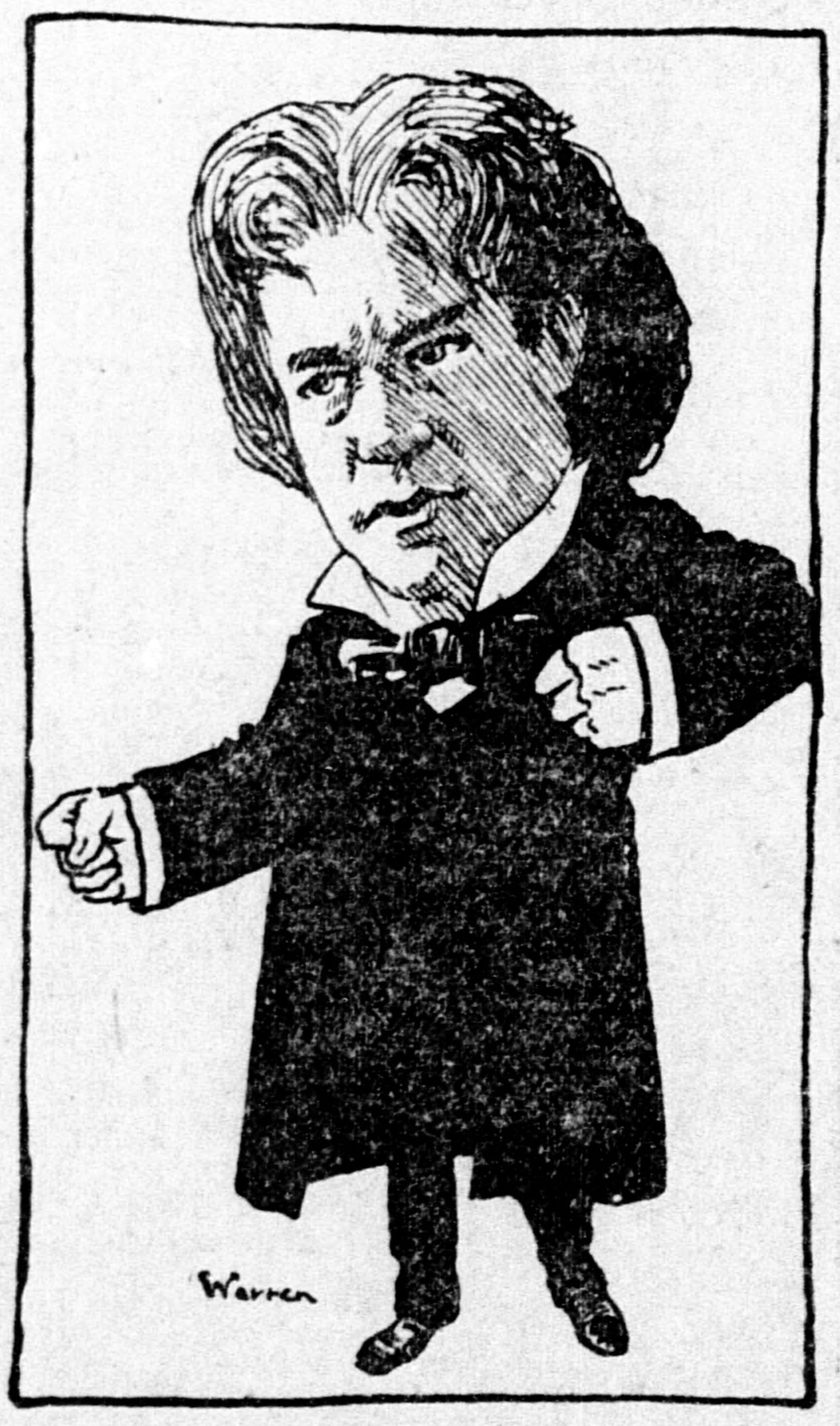
Davis became a popular, sensational orator

He began his ministry with short pastorates in Sullivan and Mattoon, Illinois, before returning to California, where he was pastor at Oakland's Central Christian Church for four years. He gained a reputation as an orator and lecturer, and was known as the "poet-preacher" and the "Talmage of the West". In less than two years membership in his congregation tripled and audiences swelled to see the minister dubbed by the New York Tribune: "actor-preacher, a word-painter, a patron of the waltz... and the most popular preacher in the city." He enacted scenes from Richard III in sermon to an audience of fifteen hundred people, and on another occasion sought to illustrate the innocence of dancing by giving representations of the waltz. He added footlights to his pulpit. A writer for the San Francisco Town Talk recalled: "as a clergyman Edwards Davis was skilled in the arts of advertising. He was always doing something to attract attention to himself. He rode a wheel before bicycling became common, he wore a claw-hammer in the pulpit, he waltzed for his congregation." He was an admirer of Irish author Oscar Wilde, and often billed himself as "the American Oscar Wilde" (a moniker originated by newspapers), but dropped the nickname after Wilde's arrest for gross indecency. He defended agnostic orator Robert G. Ingersoll. He offered to officiate a wedding in a lion cage at San Francisco's Chutes amusement park. (Note: The proposed lion cage wedding did not occur.) The Oregonian wrote: "Davis' preaching ever bordered on the spectacular. His enemies said he did more harm to the church than good; his friends said he was one of the mainstays of the denomination".

In early 1898, Davis became involved in a case involving convicted murderer Theodore Durrant that eventually led to Davis resigning from his church. Davis visited Durrant in prison on January 6, the night before his execution, ostensibly to offer spiritual council, but was later suspected of being sent by the San Francisco Examiner to obtain an interview. As reported by the San Francisco Evening Bulletin the next day, Davis had come in the service of a morning newspaper, and as he left Durrant's cell a scrimmage broke out in which Davis was very frightened. Durrant's father shouted "God! Haven't you any respect for a minister of the gospel?" A prizefighter who had been accompanying Davis attempted to intervene, was thwarted by a guard with a gun, and Davis was escorted to his carriage. The prizefighter was thought to be a bodyguard hired by the Examiner. Davis claimed libel, and sued the Bulletin for $50,000. The affair arose controversy within his church and the public, and he resigned from his ministry on January 23, 1898. One week later, he married Alta Margaret ("Alice") Kingore, a choir singer from his congregation.

In May 1898, Davis was accused of a variety of misconducts, including drunkenness and associating with "loose characters". In August, a group of California ministers issued a proclamation stating he was no longer allowed to preach in the state.

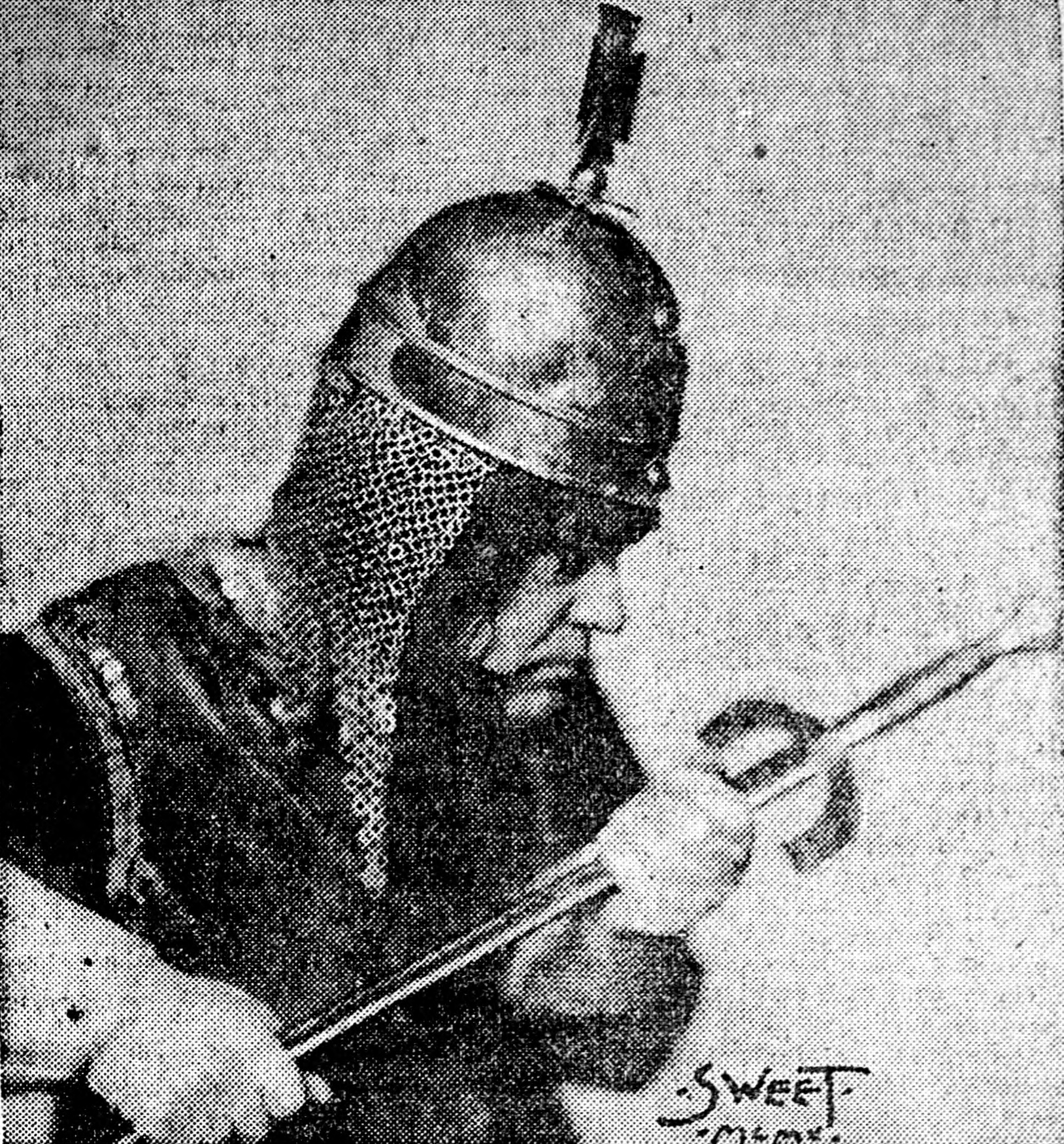
Davis in The Unmasking, in which he made over 1,000 performances

== Vaudeville and Broadway ==
Davis and his wife, Kingore, moved to New York, where after secular business plans failed they found themselves stranded. His New York stage debut was in January 1889, with a one-line role as the Viceroy of India in The Cherry Pickers. He toured with Charles Coghlan's company in The Royal Box until Coghlan's November 1899 death, and with Charles Frohman's The Adventures of Lady Ursula in 1900. Kingore also went into theatre, after Davis was incapacitated for several weeks with a broken foot. In April 1900 Kingore filed for divorce while Davis was on tour, (Note: The Oakland Tribune and San Francisco Call published several letters from Davis to Kingore) and by December of that year he was stage manager for a Chicago production of The Devil and a Swede.

His first play, The Seventh Commandment, premiered in 1901 starring Robert Downing with Davis in a supporting role. He spent the next few years with various companies, including Belasco and Mayer's The Dairy Farm, which premiered at San Francisco's Alcazar Theatre in August 1903.

In the summer of 1903, Davis premiered and starred in a play of his own writing, a tragedy called The Unmasking which debuted in Oakland. The play was panned by the Oakland Enquirer, which called it "simply gross, unredeemed by the spurious and shallow sentimentality with which it reeks". He would perform The Unmasking over 1,000 times, which gained the distinction of being the first successful tragedy to be performed in vaudeville. Davis and his company brought The Unmasking onto the vaudeville circuit in 1905, touring the Orpheum Chain before making a New York City premiere in August 1906 at Keith's Union Square Theatre. A reviewer for Goodwin's Weekly called it "a great piece of work, uniquely modeled and beautifully finished... cannot be too highly commended," while reviews in Variety included "it requires attention and trimming", and "Suffers from being overacted. It was beautifully staged."

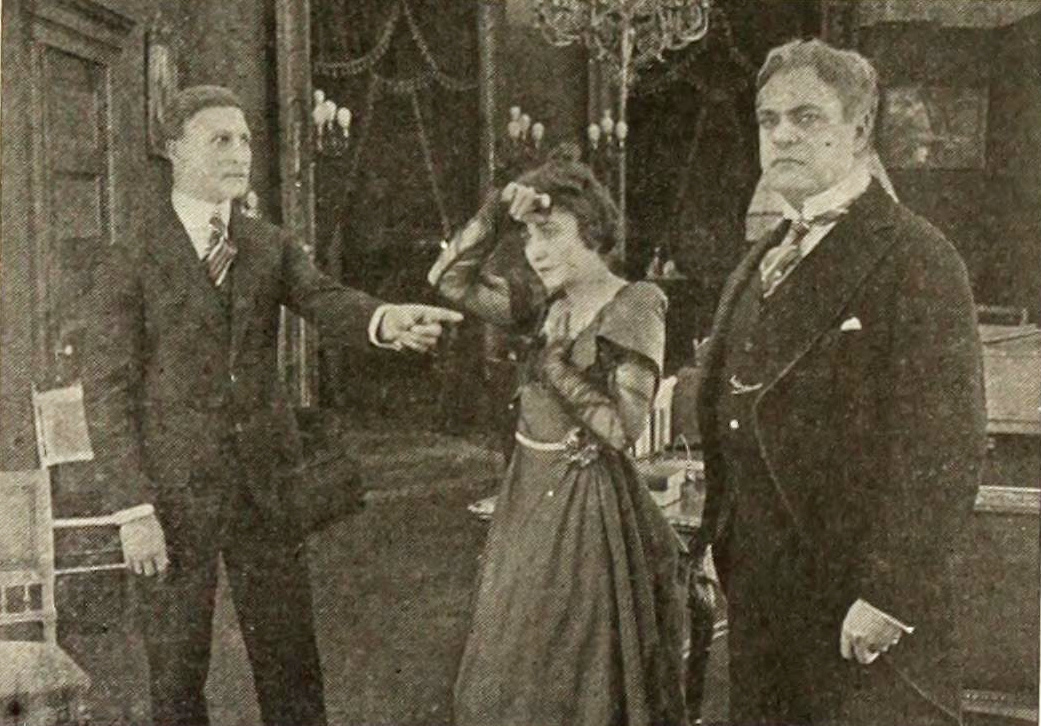
Davis (right) in The Strength of the Weak alongside Mary Fuller and Harry Hilliard

Other original works by Davis included All Rivers Meet at Sea, The Kingdom of Destiny, and a dramatization of the Oscar Wilde novel The Picture of Dorian Gray, which is among the book's earliest adaptations. Another play, The Blessed and The Damned, premiered at the Newark Theatre, New Jersey, in May 1915.

In New York City, his Broadway appearances included Daddies (1918–19) produced by David Belasco. He was a three-term president ("prompter") of the Green Room Club, and was elected president of the National Vaudeville Artists Association in 1919.

== Film and final years ==
Davis appeared in over 50 films, from the silent era into early talkies, and was known as a character actor. He had early film roles in Frederick Thomson's Her Mother's Secret (1915) and Lucius Henderson's The Strength of the Weak (1916). His performance in the latter was described as "too artificial and melodramatic to be convincing" by The Moving Picture World, while Wid's Films and Film Folk called Davis "a splendid type" who "gave a smooth performance, with the exception of a number of places where he was inclined to register his gestures with a little too much of the theatrical touch." By 1918 his film appearances included A Circus Romance, Who's Guilty, The Daughter of MacGregor, Transgression, The Victim, Bab's Matinee Idol, Dodging a Million, and De Luxe Annie.

Davis' film roles in the 1920s included The New York Idea (1920), The Plaything of Broadway (1921), Hook and Ladder (1924), and The Woman on the Jury (1924). The second half of the decade saw Davis in A Hero on Horseback (1927), A Reno Divorce (1927), The Life of Riley (1928), Happiness Ahead (1928), The Sporting Age (1928), A Song of Kentucky (1929), and Madam Satan (1930).

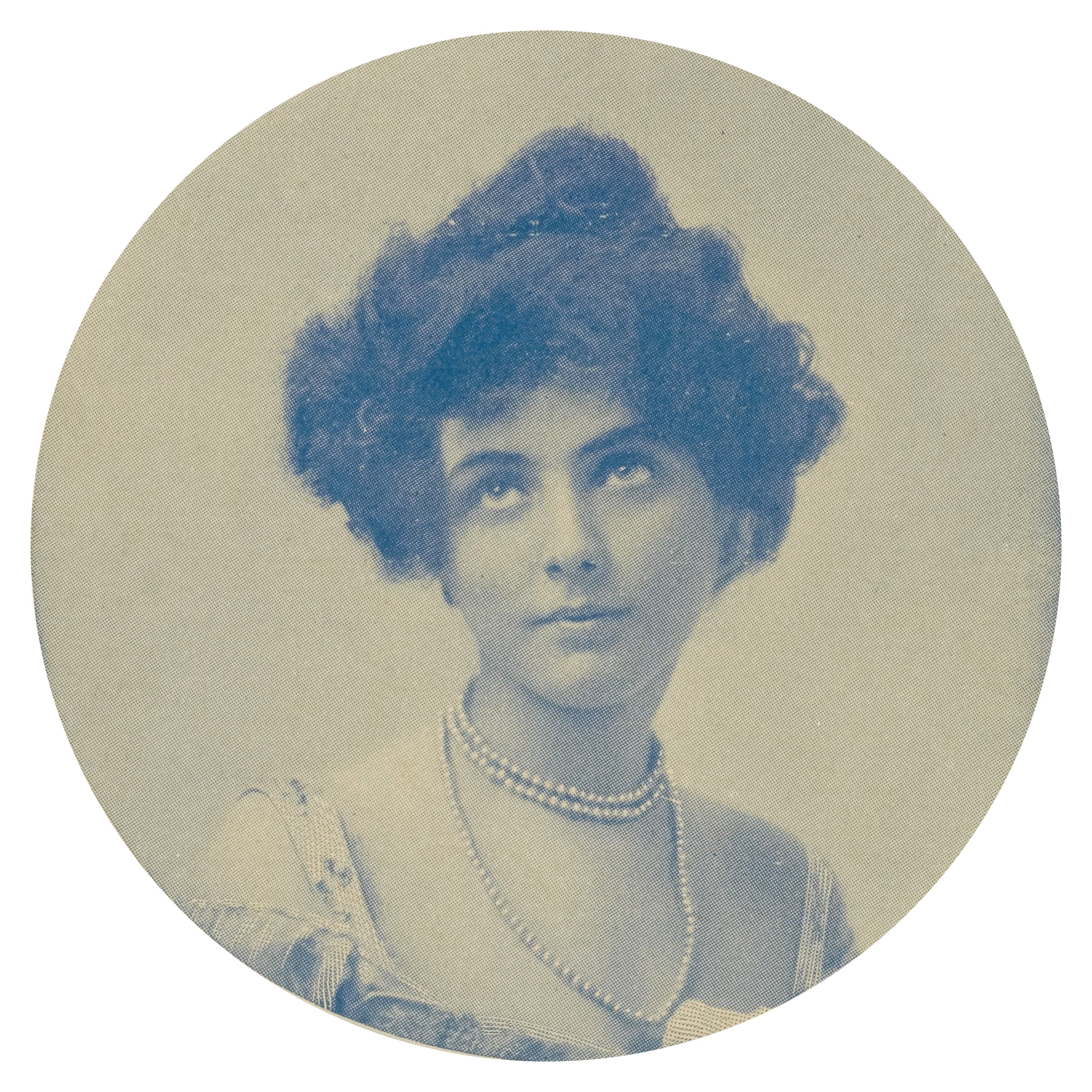
Margaret Kingore

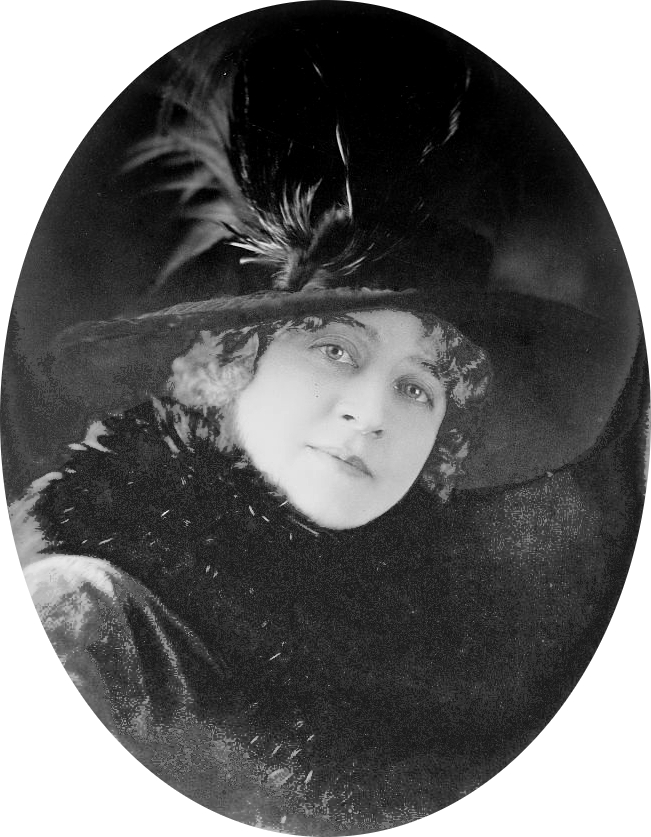
Adele Blood

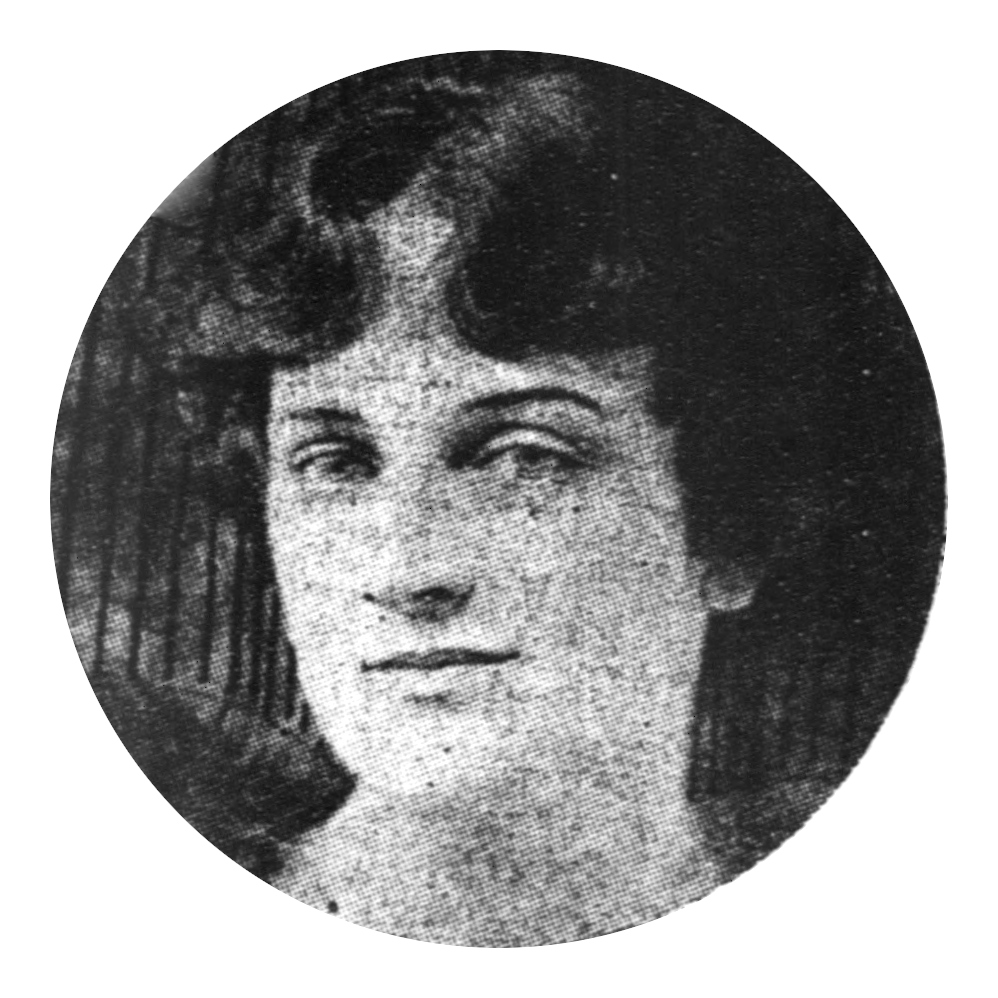
Jule Power

Davis was married to three actresses.

In Hollywood, Davis was a founder and president of the 233 Club, a Masonic organization of actors and motion picture workers. In his later years he wrote a book entitled Lovers of Life: An Epic Biography of a Soul.

On November 25, 1906, Davis married the actress Adele Blood, who was a lead in The Unmasking. They divorced in 1914, and he was later married to the actress Jule Power, (Note: Power is listed as "Mrs. Edwards Davis" by 1920.) who was named in his divorce from Blood. Power died in 1932, (Note: Davis wrote of her death in a spiritualist newsletter The Whisper.) and Davis married Elvina "Ina" Derby in 1934. Davis died in Hollywood on May 16, 1936, after a two-year illness.

== Partial filmography ==
- De Luxe Annie (1918)
- Kildare of Storm (1918)
- The Love Cheat (1919)
- The Invisible Ray (1920)
- The Right Way (1921)
- The Plaything of Broadway (1921)
- The Sea Hawk (1924)
- The Only Woman (1924)
- On the Stroke of Three (1924)
- Stolen Secrets (1924)
- Tainted Money (1924)
- The Price She Paid (1924)
- Her Husband's Secret (1925)
- My Neighbor's Wife (1925)
- Not So Long Ago (1925)
- The Splendid Road (1925)
- The Part Time Wife (1925)
- Flattery (1925)
- Joanna (1925)
- High Steppers (1926)
- Tramp, Tramp, Tramp (1926)
- The Amateur Gentleman (1926)
- On the Front Page (1926)
- Butterflies in the Rain (1926)
- The Hero on Horseback (1927)
- Face Value (1927)
- Singed (1927)
- The Life of Riley (1927)
- Winds of the Pampas (1927)
- Madonna of the Streets (1930)
