= The Re-Creation of Brian Kent =

1925 film directed by Sam Wood

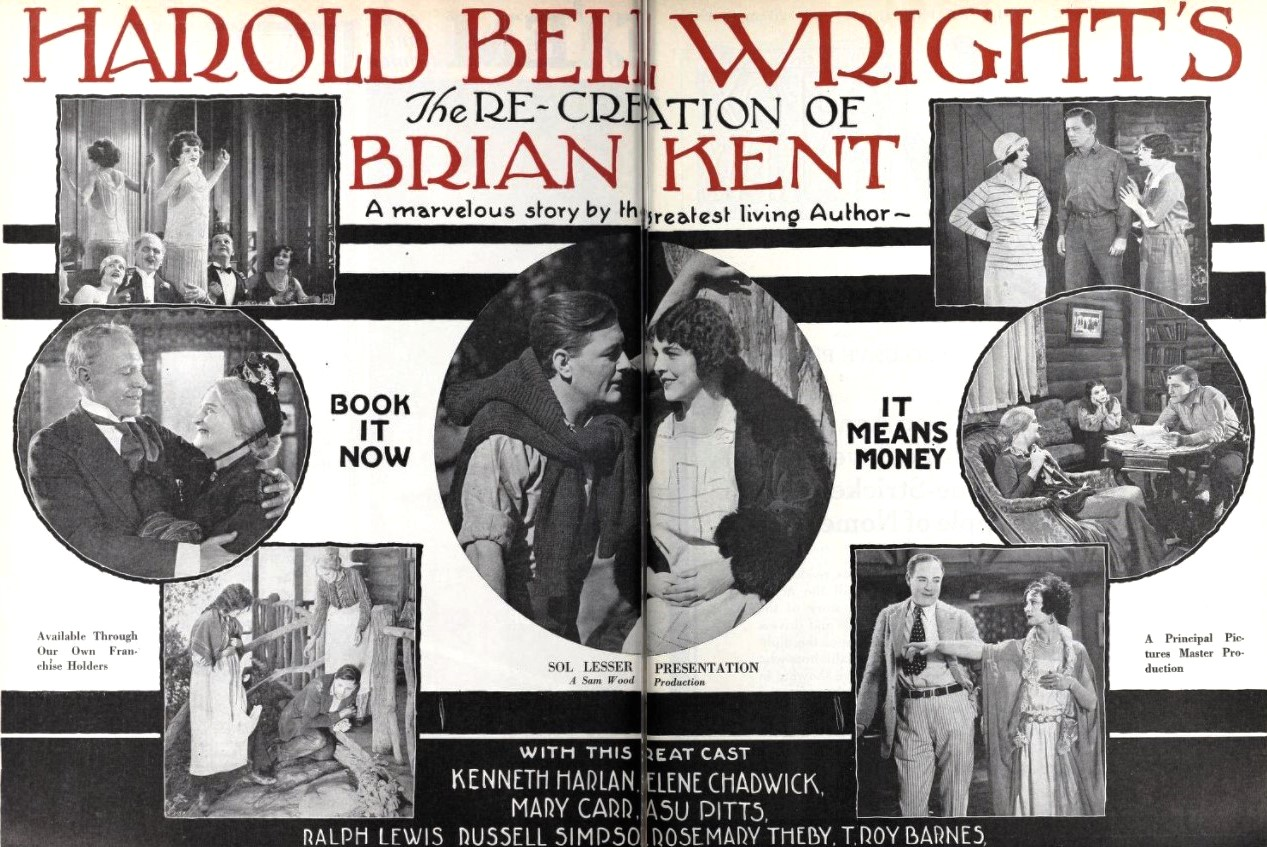
- Advertisement
- Directed by: Sam Wood
- Screenplay by: Mary Alice Scully; Arthur F. Statter
- Based on: The Re-Creation of Brian Kent by Harold Bell Wright
- Produced by: Sol Lesser
- Starring: Kenneth Harlan; Helene Chadwick; Mary Carr; ZaSu Pitts; Rosemary Theby; T. Roy Barnes; Ralph Lewis; Russell Simpson
- Cinematography: Glen MacWilliams
- Production company: Sol Lesser Productions
- Distributed by: Principal Distributing
- Release date: February 15, 1925
- Running time: 70 minutes
- Country: United States
- Language: Silent (English intertitles)

The Re-Creation of Brian Kent is a 1925 American drama film directed by Sam Wood and written by Mary Alice Scully and Arthur F. Statter. It is based on the 1919 novel The Re-Creation of Brian Kent by Harold Bell Wright. The film stars Kenneth Harlan, Helene Chadwick, Mary Carr, ZaSu Pitts, Rosemary Theby, T. Roy Barnes, Ralph Lewis, and Russell Simpson. The film was released on February 15, 1925, by Principal Distributing.

== Plot ==
To satisfy all the wishes of a demanding wife, Brian Kent steals a large sum from the bank where he works. Overwhelmed with remorse, the man then attempts suicide on a boat that is adrift in a tumultuous river. The small boat, however, ends up entangled in the branches of the willows along the shore and Brian meets Judy, a girl who lives nearby and who introduces him to her aunt Sue. The latter, a kind teacher, has a positive influence on Brian who, trying to leave the past behind, becomes another man and even begins to write a book. But when he falls in love with Betty Jo, he arouses jealousy in Judy, who tells her father about her less than exemplary past. The man informs the bank of Brian's whereabouts, but Aunt Sue manages to persuade the bank president - an old student of his - not to pursue him. His wife, who came to find him, drowns in the river and Brian is now free to start a happy life with Betty Jo.

== Cast ==
- Kenneth Harlan as Brian Kent
- Helene Chadwick as Betty Joe
- Mary Carr as Auntie Sue
- ZaSu Pitts as Judy
- Rosemary Theby as Mrs. Kent
- T. Roy Barnes as Harry Green
- Ralph Lewis as Homer Ward
- Russell Simpson as Jap Taylor
- DeWitt Jennings as Detective Ross
- Russ Powell as Sheriff Knox
- Claire de Lorez (uncredited)
- Florence Lee (uncredited)

== Preservation ==
The film is preserved in the Library of Congress collection.

== See also ==
- Wild Brian Kent (1936)
