= Mary Alice Scully =

American screenwriter

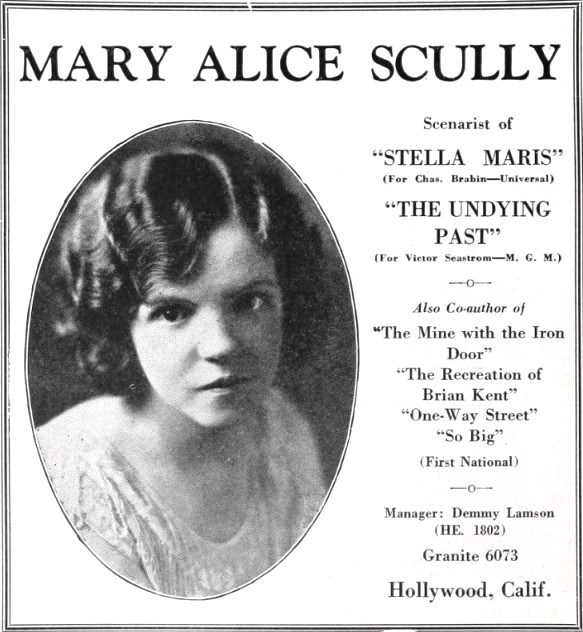
- 1925 advertisement
- Born: October 26, 1902; Lowell, Massachusetts, USA
- Died: July 1, 1978 (aged 75); San Diego, California, USA
- Occupation: Screenwriter
- Spouse: Pierre Gendron (1928-1956)

Mary Alice Scully (1902-1978) was an American screenwriter active during the 1920s.

== Biography ==
Mary Alice was born in Lowell, Massachusetts, to Phillip Scully and Mary Ahearn. She attended Ten-Acre School and Dana Hall before going off to Wellesley; she left without a degree in order to take care of her sick mother.

The pair headed west to California for her mother's health, where Mary Alice studied shorthand, won typing awards, opened a public stenographer service, served as secretary to Christine Wetherill Stevenson, and eventually gained work at a film studio.

Eventually she got the chance to work on her own screenplays and adaptations; by 1925, she had sold four scripts to First National and six more to other studios. She formed a collaboration with Arthur F. Statter, secretary of the Screen Writers Guild.

In 1928, she married actor and screenwriter Pierre Gendron in Riverside, California. The pair had two children, Peter and Diane. She seems to have retired from filmmaking at this point.

== Filmography ==
- The Mine with the Iron Door (1924)
- The Re-Creation of Brian Kent (1925)
- One Way Street (1925)
- Stella Maris (1925)
- Brooding Eyes (1926)
- Whispering Canyon (1926)
- A Hero on Horseback (1927) (adaptation)
