= Mitchell L. Erlanger =

American judge

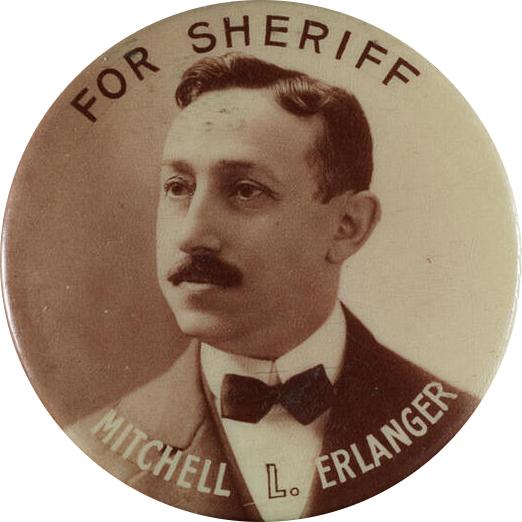
- Image of Mitchell L. Erlanger on his 1903 New York County Sheriff Button
- Born: Mitchell Louis Erlanger; February 15, 1857; Buffalo, New York
- Died: August 30, 1940 (aged 83); New York City
- Occupation: Judge

Mitchell Louis Erlanger (February 15, 1857 – August 30, 1940) was a Jewish-American lawyer and judge from New York.

== Life ==
Erlanger was born on February 15, 1857, in Buffalo, New York, the son of Leopold Erlanger and Rachel Lobenthal.

Erlanger attended public school in Cleveland, Ohio. He studied medicine at one point and was self-taught in the classics before he entered Columbia Law School. He graduated from there in 1882 with an LL.B. and spent the next two years working as a librarian in the Law School. He also lectured on real estate law and equity in the upper classes, and assisted the College Dean, Professor Dwight, with preparing opinions and examining the law. He then began to practice law for over twenty years. One of his classmates in Columbia was future President Theodore Roosevelt.

Erlanger served as Sheriff of New York County from 1904 to 1905. As Sheriff, he instituted a number of reforms and freed hundreds of prisoners held in the Ludlow Street Jail, many of whom were held there for many years. He also supported repealing laws that permitted arrest in civil cases except for contempt of court. A bill was submitted to the New York State Legislature to support this proposal, but although it had support from prominent clergy members across multiple denominations as well as the Bench and Bar the bill failed. In 1906, he was elected to the New York Supreme Court as a Democrat for a 14 year term. He was re-elected in 1920 with the nomination of all the political parties. He retired from the bench in 1927, when he reached the mandatory retirement age of 70.

Erlanger's brother was theater manager Abraham L. Erlanger. He served as counsel for his brother's firm Klaw and Erlanger for many years, and following Abraham's death he became president of A. L. Erlanger Amusement Enterprises, Inc. When Abraham died, Erlanger claimed his brother had no widow, only for Charlotte Fixel to claim she was Abraham's common-law wife and entitled to a widow's share of his estate and hire Max Steuer as her attorney. Then-Surrogate and future Mayor John P. O'Brien ultimately recognized Fixel as Abraham's common-law wife and gave her the right to contest the will. In 1935, he was named a co-defendant with Maude Adams in a suit brought by stage director John D. Williams for returning Adams to the stage in a breach of contract.

Erlanger was a director of the Hebrew Infant Asylum, the Hebrew Immigrant Aid Society, and the Montefiore Home. He was a member of the United Hebrew Charities, Mount Sinai Hospital, and the Jewish Publication Society. He was also a 32nd degree Freemason and a member of the Harmonie Club, the Green Room Club, and the Inwood Country Club. He attended Temple Beth-El. In 1932, he married Janet Nordenshield. He wrote a play with her that his brother Abraham liked but never produced due to Abraham's death.

Erlanger died from a heart attack at his home, 211 Central Park West, on August 30, 1940.
