= One Way Street (1925 film) =

1925 film

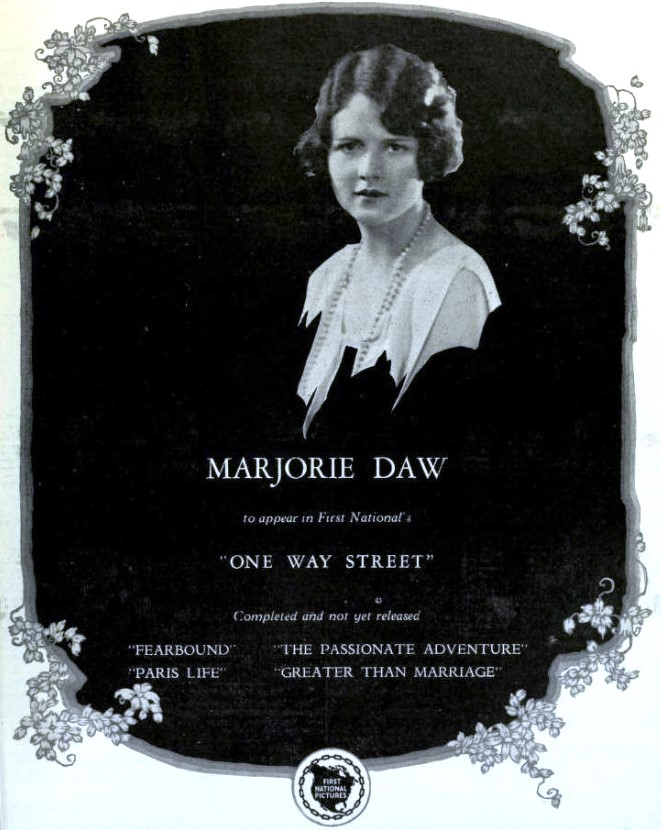
- Advertisement
- Directed by: John Francis Dillon
- Screenplay by: Earl Hudson; Mary Alice Scully; Arthur F. Statter
- Based on: One Way Street by Beale Davis
- Produced by: Earl Hudson
- Starring: Ben Lyon; Anna Q. Nilsson; Marjorie Daw; Dorothy Cumming; Lumsden Hare; Mona Kingsley
- Cinematography: Arthur Edeson
- Production company: First National Pictures
- Distributed by: First National Pictures
- Release date: April 12, 1925
- Running time: 60 minutes
- Country: United States
- Language: Silent (English intertitles)

One Way Street is a 1925 American drama film directed by John Francis Dillon and written by Earl Hudson, Mary Alice Scully, and Arthur F. Statter. It is based on the 1924 novel One Way Street by Beale Davis. The film stars Ben Lyon, Anna Q. Nilsson, Marjorie Daw, Dorothy Cumming, Lumsden Hare, and Mona Kingsley. The film was released on April 12, 1925, by First National Pictures.

== Plot ==
As described in a film magazine review, Bobby Austin is sent to Madrid on a diplomatic mission but is followed by Lady Sylvia Hutton, a society adventuress who is infatuated with him. She takes him on a yachting trip to Monte Carlo, where he meets Kathleen Lawrence, a notorious "kept woman." Kathleen tries to save Bobby from the ruin that Lady Sylvia bares in her wake. Lady Sylvia takes up with another man, and Bobby turns to Kathleen. He loses his post and returns to London where he makes his living from his winnings gambling at cards. When he refuses to return to Lady Sylvia, she takes her revenge by slipping an ace into his hands. He is branded as a card cheat. In the meantime, Kathleen meets Elizabeth Stuart, a sweet young woman whom she knows will make a good match and will save Bobby from the fate that threatens him. Lady Sylvia's treachery is exposed, Bobby resumes his rightful place in society, and he wins Elizabeth's love.

== Cast ==
- Ben Lyon as Bobby Austin
- Anna Q. Nilsson as Lady Sylvia Hutton
- Marjorie Daw as Elizabeth Stuart
- Dorothy Cumming as Lady Frances Thompson
- Lumsden Hare as Sir Edward Hutton
- Mona Kingsley as Kathleen Lawrence
- Thomas Holding as John Stuart

== Preservation ==
With no prints of One Way Street located in any film archives, it is a lost film.
