= Jule Power =

American actress (1880–1932)

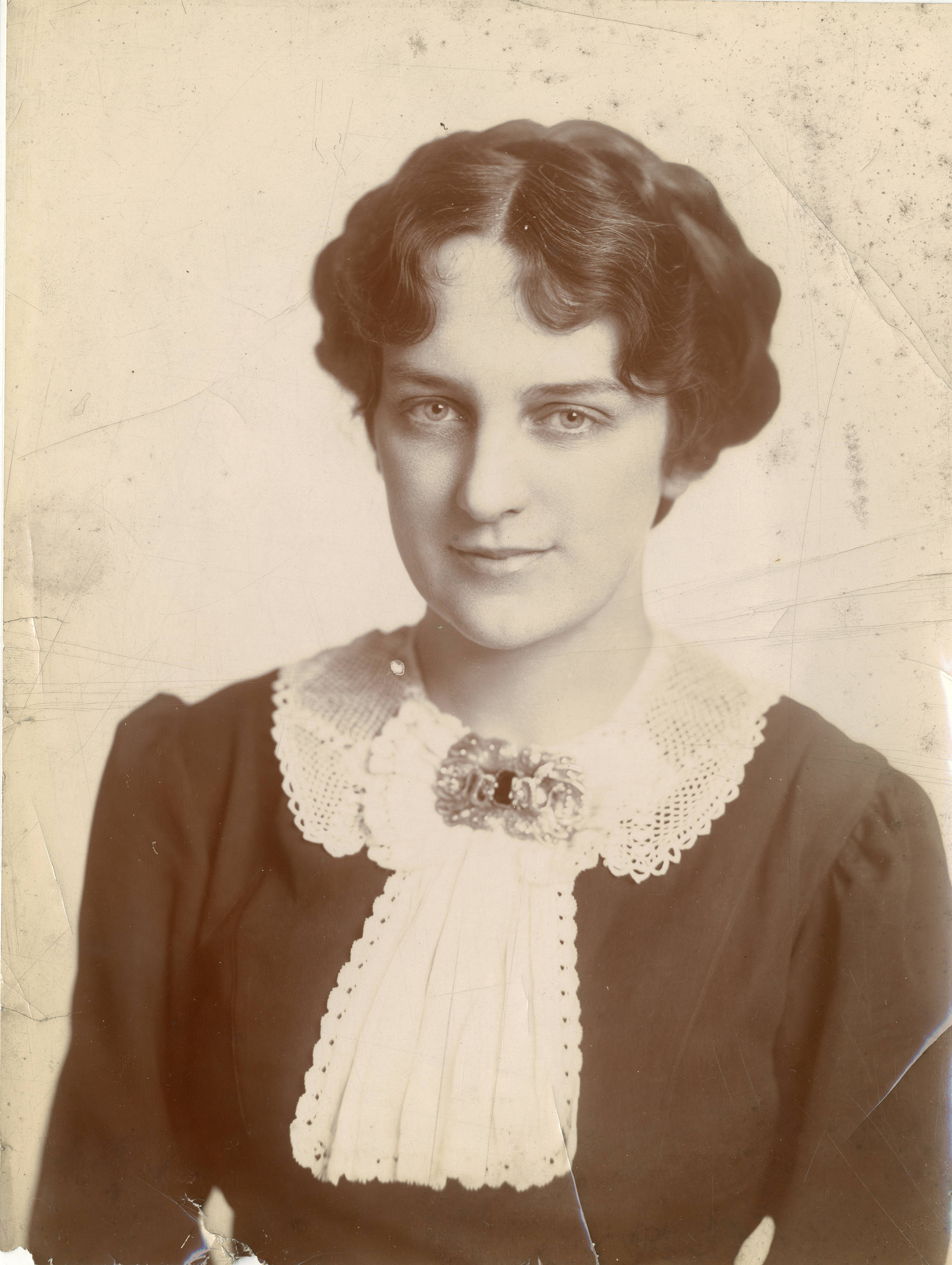
- Born: 1880; Portland, Oregon
- Died: 1932 (aged 51–52); Los Angeles, California
- Other names: Jewel Power, Jule Power Bryant
- Occupation: Actress
- Spouse: Frederick E. Bryant (m. 1913, divorced) Edwards Davis (m. 1915; died 1932)

Louise "Jule" Power (1880 – February, 1932) was an American silent film and stage actress.

== Early life ==
Power was born in Portland, Oregon to Richard B. Power and N. L. Power. Her father died when she was young and she had to try to earn a living.

== Career ==
She had frequently been photographed by E. W. Moore who brought her to the attention of Baker Stock Company. She did her first performance in 1905. Her first New York appearance was supporting Wilton Lackaye in Les Miserables. When she performed The Kingdom of Destiny in Oakland California, she delivered a benediction from the top of the brand new Oakland City Hall wearing her symbolic costume from the play as a promotional stunt.

She shifted to silent films in 1915. Her role in Gloria's Romance was noted in the press for the very fancy costuming, including an "Egyptian Ring"—an elaborate fur coat.

== Personal life ==
Power had been married to Frederick Esmelton Bryant, an actor and stage director. She met Edwards Davis when the two were working together on the play The Kingdom of Destiny. She and Bryant divorced in a very public proceeding involving Davis and Adele Blood. She married Davis in 1915 following his divorce from Blood. She had one son, Bonnie.

== Filmography ==
Year	Title	Role	Notes
1915	Her Mother's Secret	Bernice Archer	
1916	Gloria's Romance	Lois Freeman	
1921	The Silver Lining	Mrs. Baxter	
1924	For Sale	Mrs. Twombly-Smith	
