= De Luxe Annie =

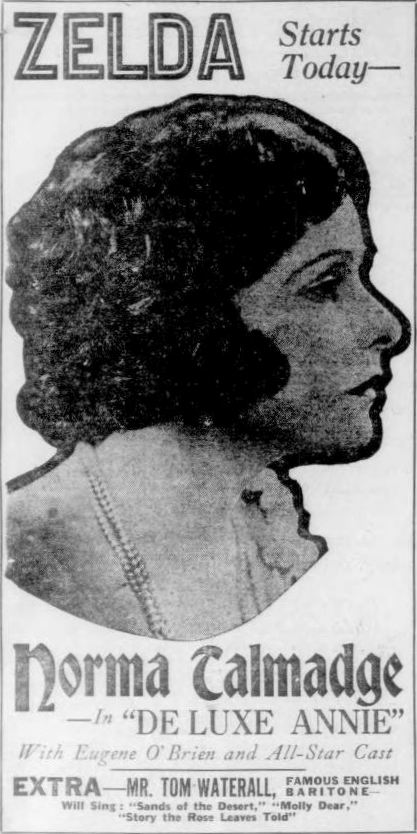
- Advertisement
- Directed by: Roland West
- Written by: Paul West
- Based on: De Luxe Annie by Edward Clark
- Starring: Norma Talmadge; Eugene O'Brien; Frank Mills
- Cinematography: Albert Moses; Edward Wynard
- Production company: Norma Talmadge Film Corporation
- Distributed by: Select Pictures
- Release date: May 19, 1918
- Running time: 7 reels
- Country: United States
- Language: Silent (English intertitles)

De Luxe Annie is a 1918 American silent drama film directed by Roland West and starring Norma Talmadge, Eugene O'Brien, and Frank Mills.

== Plot ==
As described in a film magazine review, Julie Kendal, loving wife of a devoted husband, is struck on the head and becomes an aphasia victim. While in this condition she becomes she becomes the confederate of a crook who practices the old badger game. She one day strays into the town in which she lives, and all unwittingly led by a chain of events to her own home. There her husband and a doctor friend find her. By means of an operation she is restored to health and is happily reunited with her husband.

== Cast ==
- Norma Talmadge as Julie Kendal (De Luxe Annie II)
- Eugene O'Brien as Jimmy Fitzpatrick
- Frank R. Mills as Walter Kendal
- Edna Hunter as Mrs. Archer (De Luxe Annie I)
- Fred R. Stanton as Detective Cronin
- Joseph Burke as Cyrus Monroe
- Edwards Davis as Dr. Fernand Niblo
- Harriet Jenkins as Janet Kendal
- David Burns as Joe, a Grocery Clerk

== Preservation ==
A copy of De Luxe Annie is in the Library of Congress and the holdings of Cohen Media.
