= Robert T. Shannon =

American screenwriter

- Born: January 8, 1895; Kansas City, Missouri, United States
- Died: February 7, 1950 (aged 55); Los Angeles, California, United States
- Occupation: Writer
- Years active: 1921–1948 (film)

Robert T. Shannon (1895–1950) was an American screenwriter and novelist. He worked for several Hollywood studios. During the 1940s he worked for Republic Pictures. His novel Fabulous Ann Madlock was adapted into the 1951 Errol Flynn film Adventures of Captain Fabian.

== Selected filmography ==
- The Girl with the Jazz Heart (1921)
- Lover Come Back (1931)
- Strictly Personal (1933)
- I Sell Anything (1934)
- Times Square Lady (1935)
- A Night at the Ritz (1935)
- King Solomon of Broadway (1935)
- Moonlight murder (1936)
- The Lady Fights Back (1937)
- Prescription for Romance (1937)
- Racketeers in Exile (1937)
- Invisible Enemy (1938)
- Barnyard Follies (1940)
- Sons of the Pioneers (1942)
- Wrecking Crew (1942)
- Sleepytime Gal (1942)
- Pardon My Stripes (1942)
- X Marks the Spot (1942)
- Blonde Ransom (1945)
- The Flame (1947)
- Unknown Island (1948)
- Adventures of Captain Fabian (1951)

== Bibliography ==
- Kinnard, Roy & Crnkovich, Tony . The Films of Fay Wray. McFarland, 2005.
- Martin, Len D. The Republic Pictures Checklist: Features, Serials, Cartoons, Short Subjects and Training Films of Republic Pictures Corporation, 1935–1959. McFarland, 1998.
