= Stella Maris (1925 film) =

1925 film

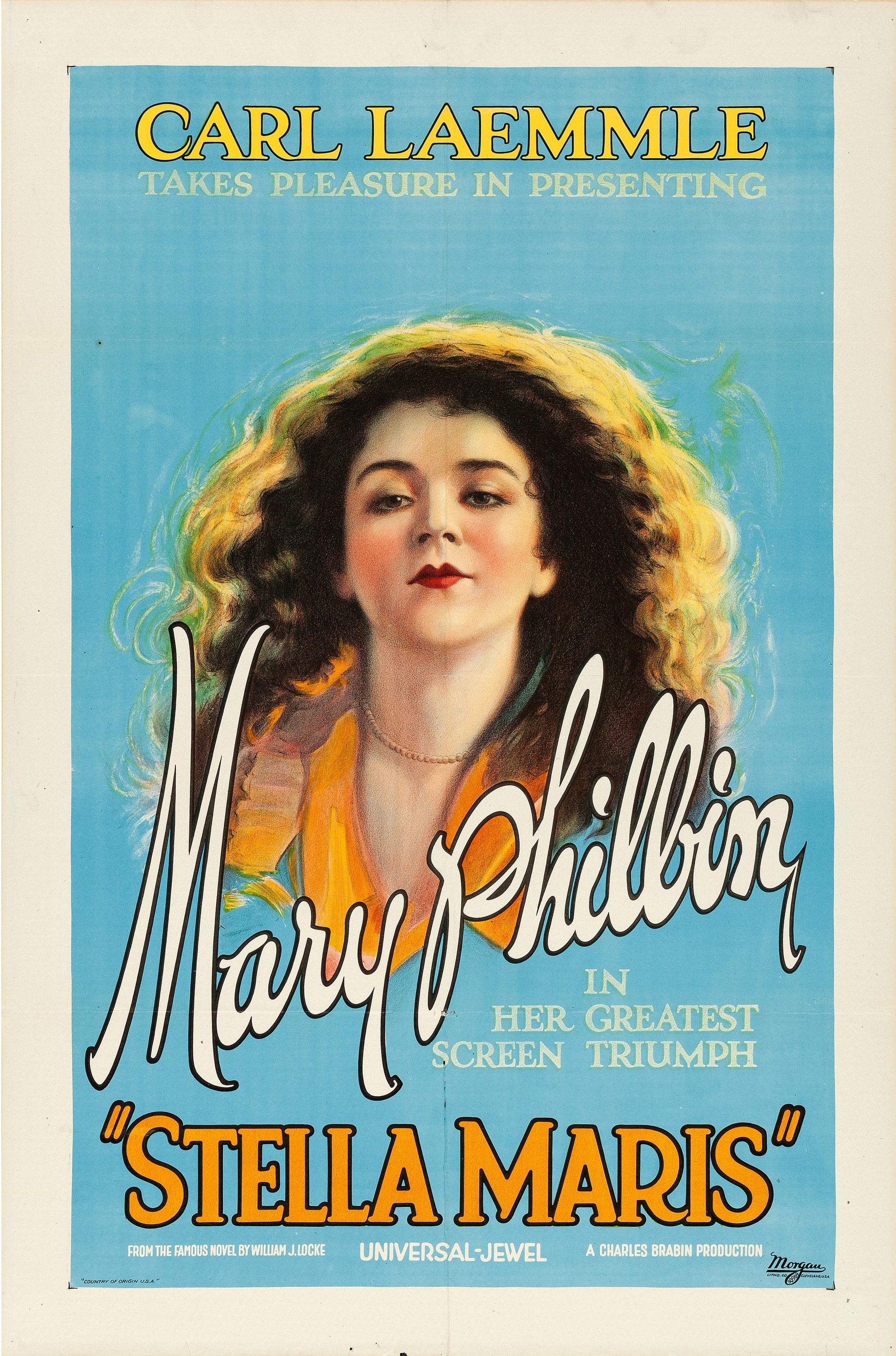
- Poster
- Directed by: Charles Brabin
- Written by: Mary Alice Scully
- Based on: Stella Maris; 1913 novel by William J. Locke
- Produced by: Carl Laemmle
- Starring: Mary Philbin
- Cinematography: Milton Moore
- Distributed by: Universal Pictures
- Release date: December 13, 1925
- Running time: 7 reels; at 5,786 feet
- Country: United States
- Language: Silent (English intertitles)

Stella Maris is a 1925 American silent drama film directed by Charles Brabin, written by Mary Alice Scully and based on a William J. Locke's 1913 novel. The film is a remake of the 1918 version, starring Mary Pickford.

== Plot ==
Stella Maris was born paralyzed and has lived all of her life in her bed in a London mansion. Her parents died and she was left a fortune by the aunt for whom she was named. She lives with her wealthy aunt and uncle who, along with a close family friend, Walter Herold, and first cousin, John Riska, do not want her to be exposed to all the bad things happening in the world. John and Walter frequently visit her. Love grows between John and Stella Maris. John, however, has a dark secret of being trapped in an unhappy marriage with Louise. Louise wants a servant and hires orphan Unity Blake. Louise beats Unity up after an incident, which results in Louise being sent to jail. John decides to adopt Unity and takes care of her. This results in Unity falling in love with John as well, despite knowing they can never be a couple. When she gets older, Stella's condition is miraculously cured by a special surgical procedure. She is no longer confined to her room. When she is able to go out, she is disillusioned and angry with her family and friends who lied to her about the ugliness of the world. She is most upset that they didn't believe she was strong enough to handle the truth. The end has tragedy and happiness.

== Cast ==
- Mary Philbin as Stella Maris / Unity Blake
- Elliott Dexter as John Risca
- Gladys Brockwell as Louise Risca
- Jason Robards Sr. as Walter Herold
- Phillips Smalley as Sir Oliver Blount
- Lillian Lawrence as Lady Blount
- Robert Bolder as Dr. Haynes
- Aileen Manning as Mary Heaton

== Preservation ==
A print of Stella Maris survives at UCLA Film & Television Archive. Outtakes from Stella Maris were preserved by the Academy Film Archive in 2016.
