= Pierre Gendron (actor) =

American actor

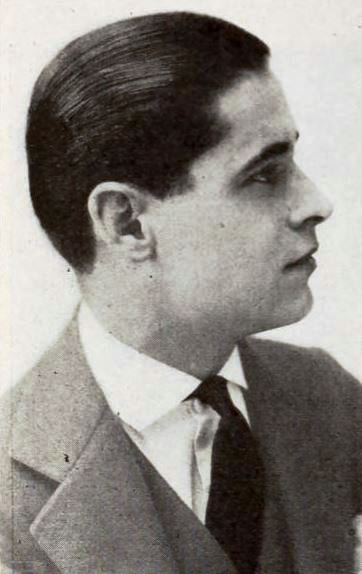
- From a 1920 magazine
- Born: 4 March 1896; Toledo, Ohio
- Died: 27 November 1956 (aged 60); Hollywood, California
- Occupations: Actor, Screenwriter
- Years active: 1920–1945

Pierre Gendron (born Leon Pierre Gendron, March 4, 1896 – November 27, 1956) was an American actor and screenwriter. He was married to screenwriter Mary Alice Scully.

== Partial filmography as actor ==
- The World and His Wife (1920) (as Leon Gendron)
- The Girl with the Jazz Heart (1921) (as Leon Guerre Gendron)
- Scrambled Wives (1921) (as Leon P. Gendron)
- If Women Only Knew (1921) (as Leon Gendron)
- The Bashful Suitor (1921)
- The Young Painter (1922)
- The Man Who Played God (1922)
- Outlaws of the Sea (1923)
- Does It Pay? (1923)
- Broadway Broke (1923)
- Just Off Broadway (1924)
- Blue Water (1924)
- The City That Never Sleeps (1924)
- Three Women (1924)
- The Dangerous Flirt (1924)
- The Lover of Camille (1924)
- What Price Beauty? (1925)
- The Scarlet Honeymoon (1925)
- The Enchanted Island (1927)

== Partial filmography as screenwriter ==
- Brooding Eyes (1926)
- Sal of Singapore (1928)
- The Monster Maker (1944)
- Minstrel Man (1944)
- Bluebeard (1944)
- Fog Island (1945)
