= Brooding Eyes =

1926 film

- Directed by: Edward LeSaint
- Written by: Pierre Gendron; Mary Alice Scully
- Based on: The Man with the Brooding Eyes by John Goodwin (pen name of Sidney Floyd Gowing)
- Starring: Lionel Barrymore; Ruth Clifford; Robert Ellis
- Production company: Banner Productions
- Distributed by: Henry Ginsberg Distributing Company
- Release date: March 15, 1926
- Running time: 60 min.
- Country: United States
- Language: Silent (English intertitles)

Brooding Eyes is a 1926 American silent crime film directed by Edward LeSaint and starring Lionel Barrymore, Ruth Clifford, and Robert Ellis.

== Plot ==
As described in a film magazine review, Slim Jim Carey, a titled nobleman who is also the leader of a band of crooks, is reported dead and leaves proof of his daughter’s claim to the estate with his henchmen. Not trusting them, he spies on them from behind his own portrait. With the aid of the man who loves his daughter, he frustrates their plots to get the money in the estate, and is caught by the police just as he is shot. Dying, he reveals his identity to the young man, but not to his daughter.

== Cast ==
- Lionel Barrymore as Slim Jim Carey
- Ruth Clifford as Joan Ayre
- Robert Ellis as Phillip Mott
- Montagu Love as Pat Callaghan
- William V. Mong as Slaney
- Lucien Littlefield as Bell
- John Miljan as Drummond
- Dot Farley as Marie De Costa
- Alma Bennett as Agnes De Costa

== Bibliography ==
- Munden, Kenneth White. The American Film Institute Catalog of Motion Pictures Produced in the United States, Part 1. University of California Press, 1997.
