= Gloria's Romance =

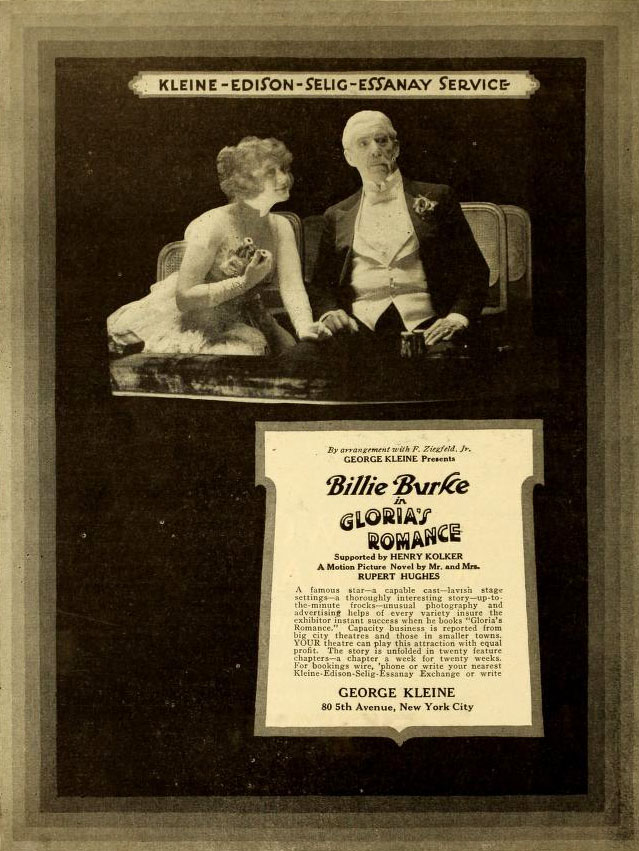
- Directed by: Walter Edwin; Colin Campbell
- Written by: Rupert Hughes
- Produced by: George Kleine
- Starring: Billie Burke; Henry Kolker; David Powell
- Cinematography: Sidney Hickox
- Music by: Jerome Kern
- Production company: George Kleine Productions
- Distributed by: K-E-S-E Service
- Release date: May 22, 1916 (Chapter 1)
- Running time: 40 reels; 20 chapters (12,000 meters, 39,370 feet)
- Country: United States
- Language: Silent (English intertitles)

Gloria's Romance is a 1916 American silent film serial starring Billie Burke. Serial films, also called chapter plays, were shorter films that were typically run before the main feature film, each of which was part of a longer story, and ended in a cliffhanger, thus encouraging the audience to return every week.

The film was Burke's second outing as a film actress, and one of the very rare occasions in which a Broadway performer of her magnitude starred in a chapter play. In its original form, this serial comprised 20 chapters and was 40 reels long, which was several chapters longer than most film serials of the time.

Gloria's Romance marked the debut of actor Richard Barthelmess. It was written by Rupert Hughes and his wife and produced by George Kleine. Walter Edwin and Colin Campbell served as principal directors. It is a lost film.

== Plot ==
An adventurous young girl in Florida gets lost in the Everglades. There she finds terror and excitement, as well as the rivalry of two men in love with her.

== Cast ==
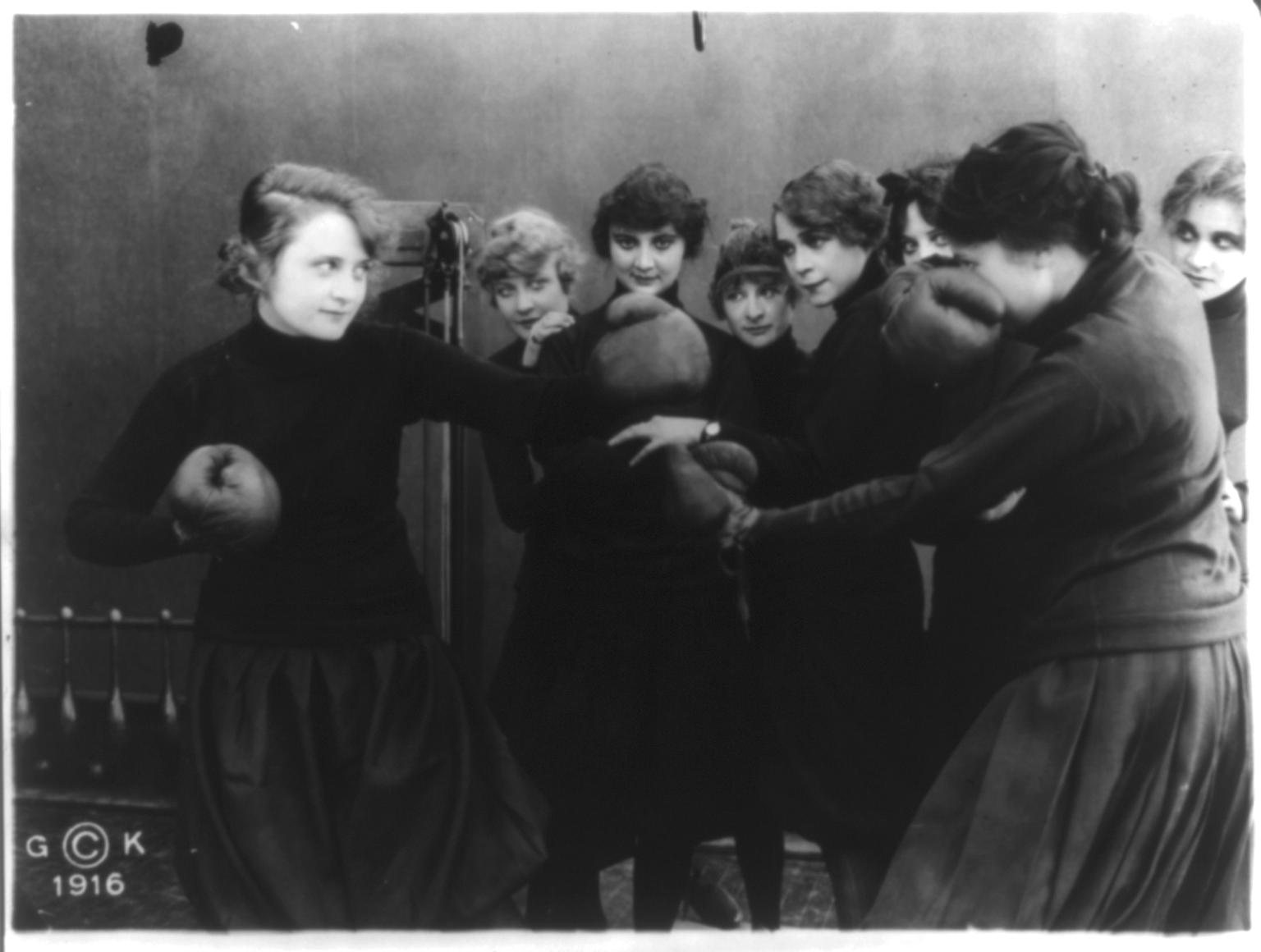
Film still of Billie Burke boxing with woman in a gymnasium.

- Billie Burke as Gloria Stafford (credited as Miss Billie Burke)
- Henry Kolker as Dr. Stephen Royce
- David Powell as Richard Freneau, A Broker
- William Roselle as David Stafford, Gloria's Brother
- Frank Belcher as Frank Lulry, Freneau's Partner
- William T. Carleton as Pierpont Stafford
- Jule Power as Lois Freeman, Judge Freeman's Daughter
- Henry Weaver as Judge Freeman
- Frank McGlynn, Sr. as Gideon Trask
- Helen Hart as Nell Trask
- Maxfield Moree as Stass Casimir
- Maurice Steuart
- Rapley Holmes as Chooey McFadden
- Adelaide Hastings as Gloria's Governess
- Ralph Bunker
- Richard Barthelmess as An Extra (uncredited)

== List of chapters ==
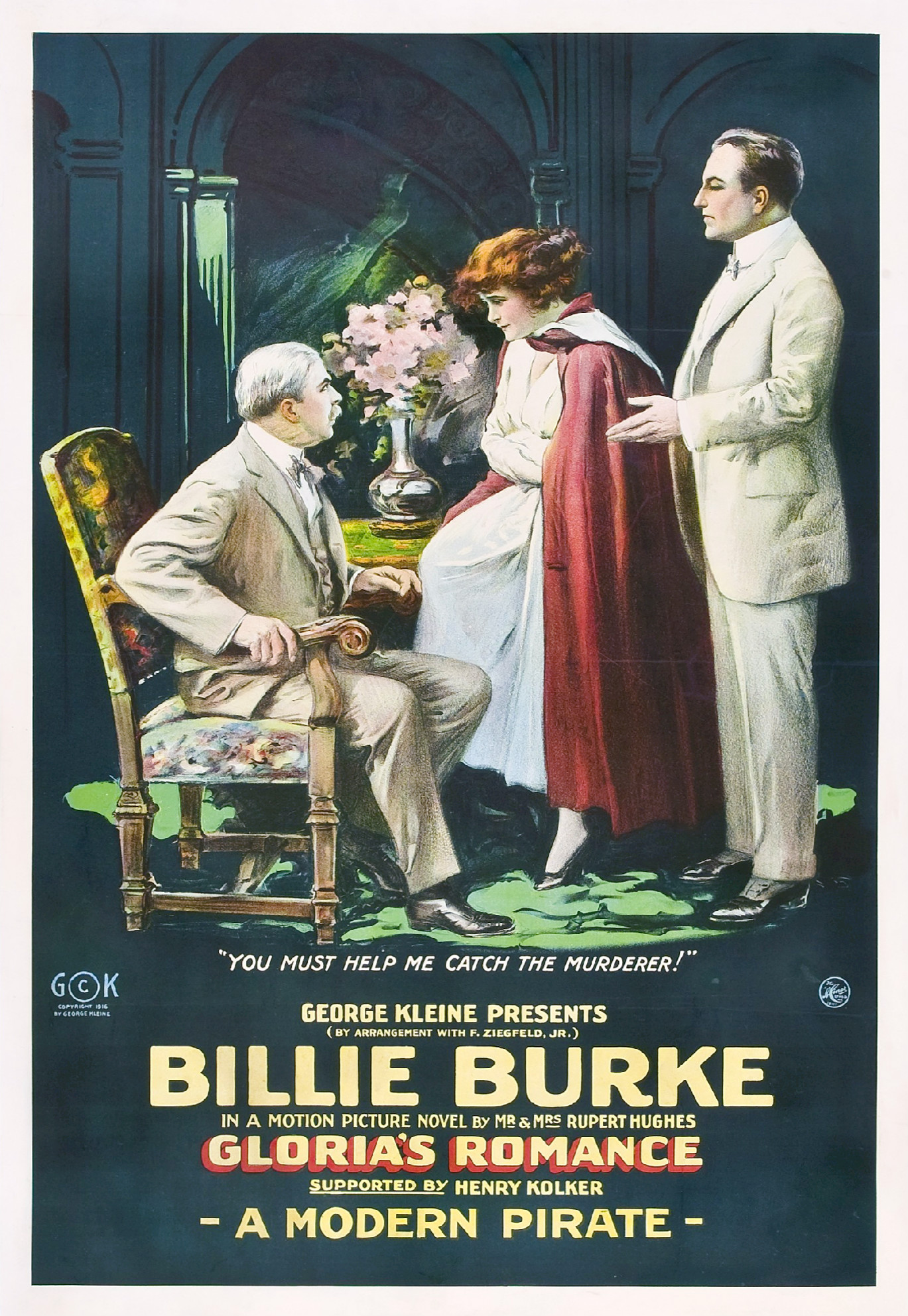

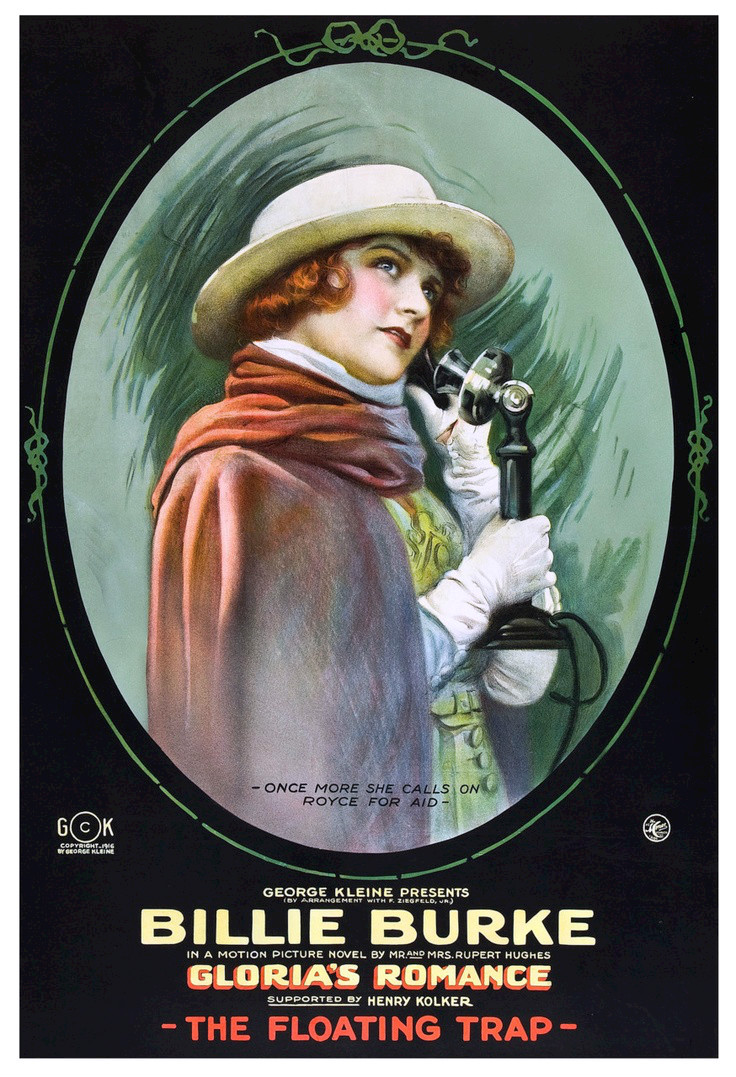

1. Lost in the Everglades
2. Caught by the Seminoles
3. A Perilous Love
4. The Social Vortex
5. The Gathering Storm
6. Hidden Fires
7. The Harvest of Sin
8. The Mesh of Mystery
9. The Shadow of Scandal
10. Tangled Threads
11. The Fugitive Witness
12. Her Fighting Spirit
13. The Midnight Riot
14. The Floating Trap
15. The Murderer at Bay
16. A Modern Pirate
17. The Tell-Tale Envelope
18. The Bitter Truth
19. Her Vow Fulfilled
20. Love's Reward

== See also ==
- List of lost films
