= Elbridge Willis Moore =

American painter, photographer, and gallery owner (1857–1938)

- Born: June 5, 1857; Gardiner, Maine, U.S.
- Died: June 10, 1938 (aged 81); Napa, California, U.S.
- Occupations: Painter; photographer; gallery owner

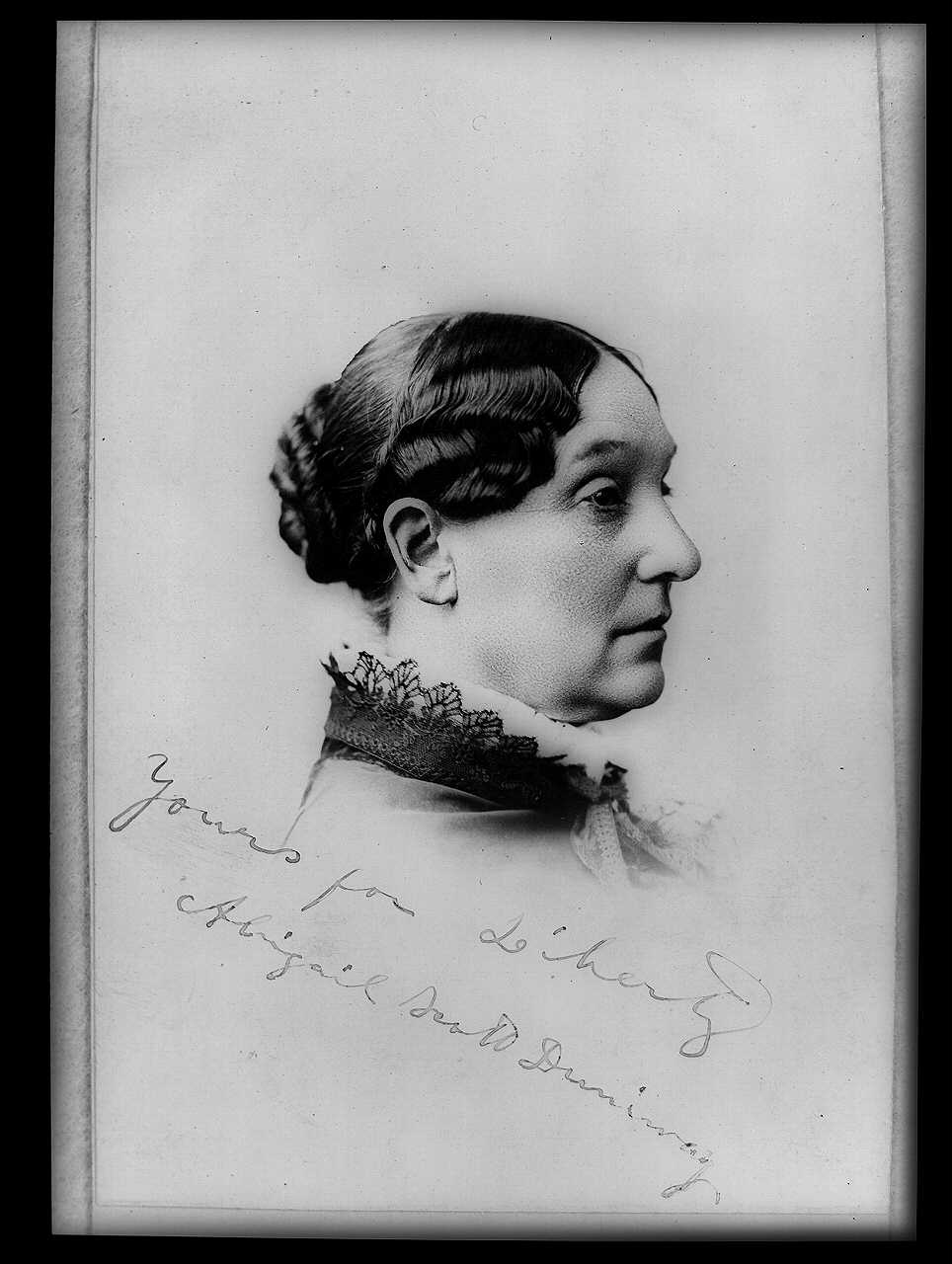
Cabinet card portrait of Abigail Scott Duniway (1870)

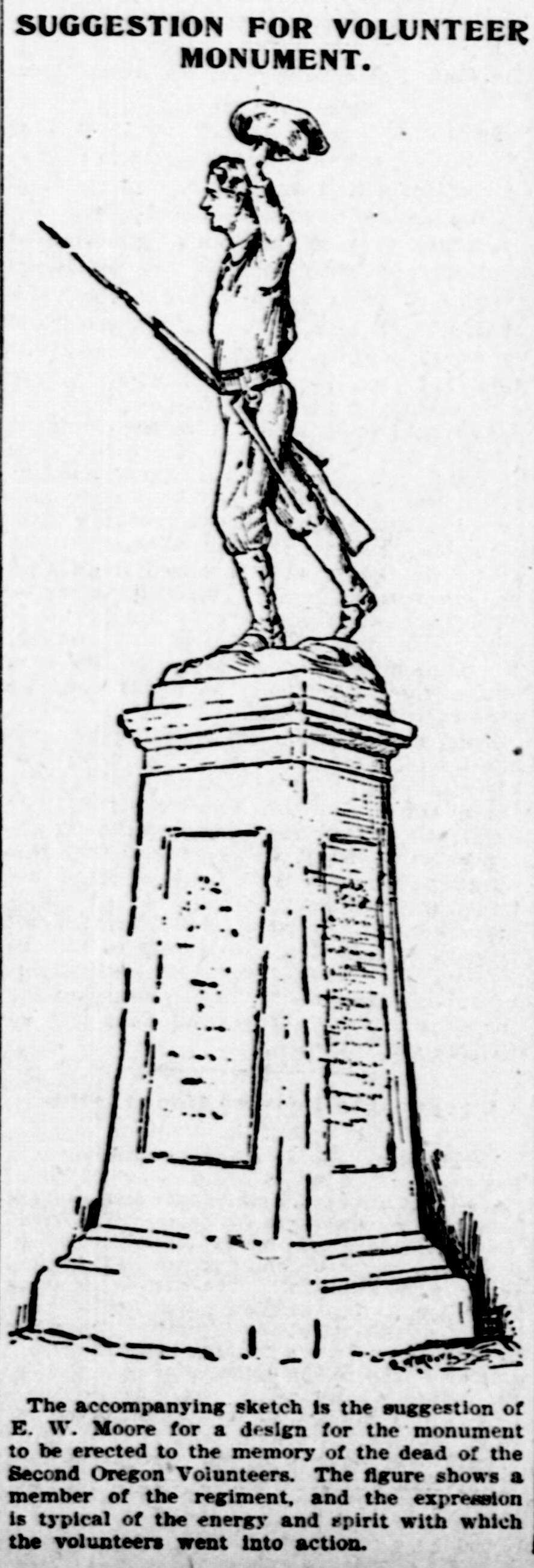
Sketch by E.W. Moore for a Volunteer Monument for the Second Oregon Volunteers

Elbridge Willis Moore (June 5, 1857 – June 10, 1938) was an American painter, photographer, and gallery owner.

Moore was born in Gardiner, Maine. He was the younger brother of Otis Merrill Moore, proprietor of the Hoquiam Record and Daily Washingtonian. He came to Hoquiam, Washington in early 1918. He worked at Frank G. Abell's photography firm before eventually taking it over when Abell moved on. The Portland Art Museum has his photograph of Susan Whalley Allison in their collection. He was also a captain.

In 1897, Moore was contracted to paint a portrait of Oregon governor William Paine Lord to hang in the Oregon State Capitol in Salem. He was also contracted to paint portraits of governors Frank W. Benson and Jay Bowerman, as well as former governor Ben W. Olcott. In addition to these portraits, he also painted a portrait of Samuel Benn, a pioneer of Aberdeen, Washington, and made a posthumous painting of Seattle newspaper editor Col. Alden J. Blethen.

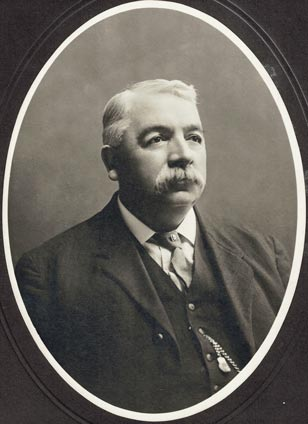
Photograph of John C. Robertson

Also a photographer, Moore took a photograph of John C. Robertson. He worked for Frank G. Abell before eventually taking over his photographic studio.

He died in Napa, California.
