= A Hero on Horseback =

1927 film directed by Del Andrews

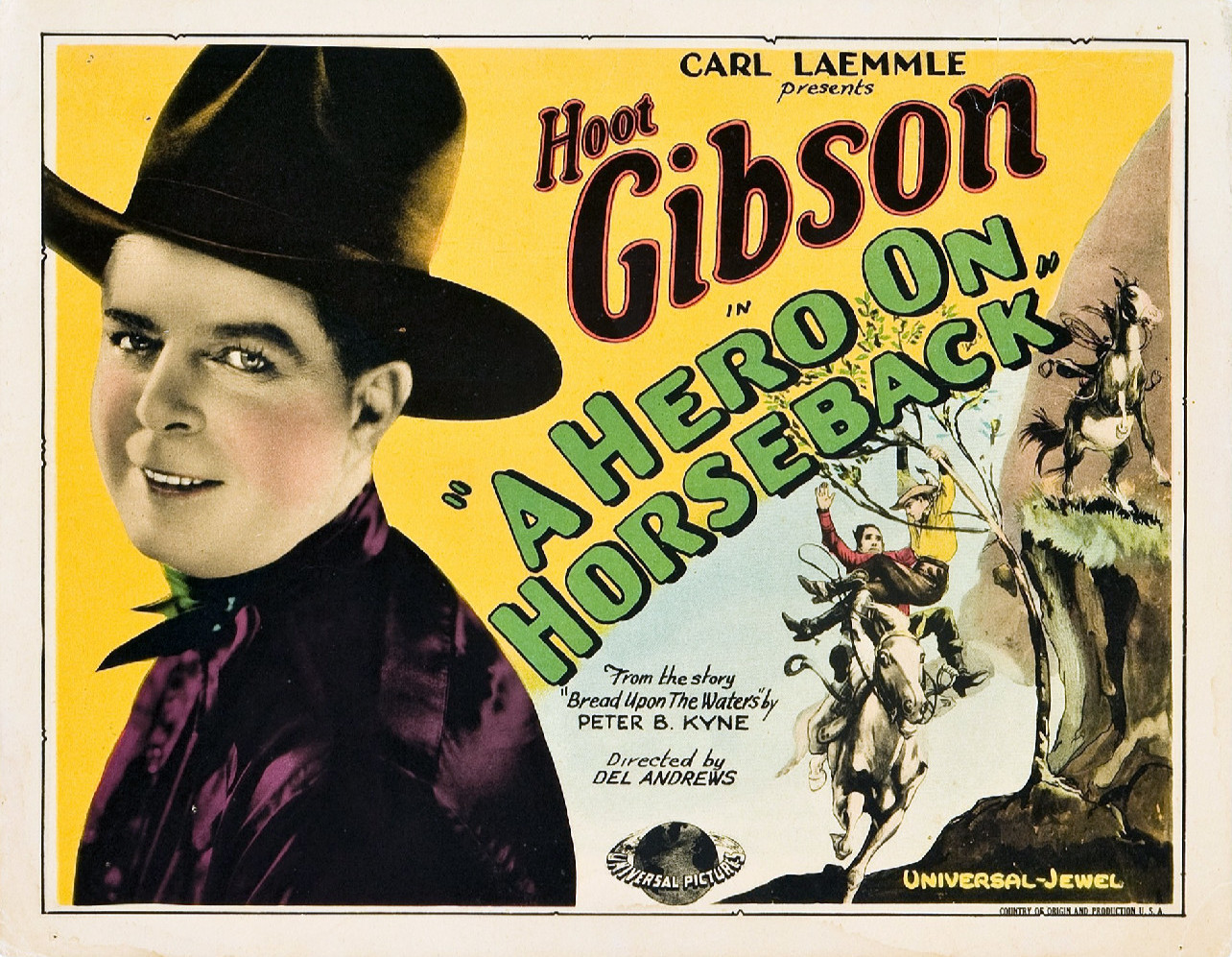
- lobby card
- Directed by: Del Andrews
- Written by: Mary Alice Scully; Arthur Statter
- Based on: Bread Upon the Water by Peter B. Kyne
- Produced by: Carl Laemmle
- Starring: Hoot Gibson
- Cinematography: Harry Neumann
- Distributed by: Universal Pictures
- Release date: July 10, 1927
- Running time: 60 minutes
- Country: United States
- Languages: Silent; English intertitles

A Hero on Horseback is a 1927 American silent Western film directed by Del Andrews and starring Hoot Gibson. It was produced and directed by Universal Pictures.

A copy is held in the Library of Congress collection.

== Plot summary ==
Billy Garford borrows $500 from rancher J.D. Starbuck and proceeds to lose most of it gambling. With $50 left, Billy stakes old prospector Jimmie Breeze.

Now broke, Billy hires himself out to Starbuck. Billy falls in love with Starbuck's daughter, Ollie and is fired when Starbuck discovers the affair.

Jimmie returns, having struck it rich, and together they buy a local bank. Mason is nearly lynched when the bank's funds are stolen.

== Cast ==
- Hoot Gibson - Billy Garford
- Ethlyne Clair - Ollie Starbuck
- Edwards Davis - J.D. Starbuck
- Edward Hearn - Harvey Grey
- Dan Mason - Jimmie Breeze

== Accolades ==
Dan Mason's role as prospector Jimmie Breeze was praised as one of his finest.

== See also ==
- Hoot Gibson filmography
