= The Plaything of Broadway =

1921 film

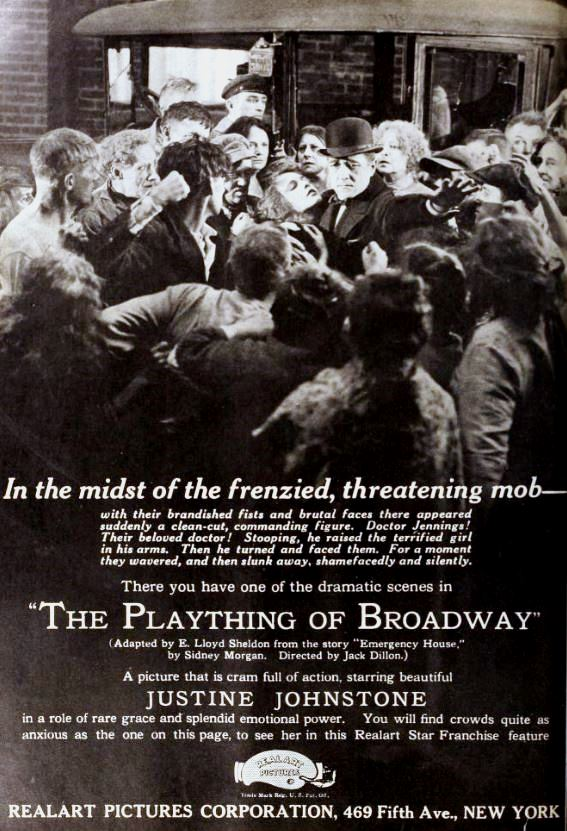
- Advertisement
- Directed by: John Francis Dillon
- Screenplay by: E. Lloyd Sheldon
- Based on: Emergency House by Sidney Morgan
- Starring: Justine Johnstone; Crauford Kent; Macey Harlam; Edwards Davis; George Cowl; Lucy Parker
- Cinematography: Gilbert Warrenton
- Production company: Realart Pictures Corporation
- Distributed by: Realart Pictures Corporation
- Release date: February 1921
- Running time: 50 minutes
- Country: United States
- Language: Silent (English intertitles)

The Plaything of Broadway is a 1921 American drama film directed by John Francis Dillon and written by E. Lloyd Sheldon. The film stars Justine Johnstone, Crauford Kent, Macey Harlam, Edwards Davis, George Cowl, and Lucy Parker. The film was released in February 1921, by Realart Pictures Corporation.

== Cast ==
- Justine Johnstone as Lola
- Crauford Kent as Dr. Jennings
- Macey Harlam as Pell
- Edwards Davis as Whitney
- George Cowl as Dr. Dexter
- Lucy Parker as Mrs. O'Connor
- Claude Cooper as The Patriarch
- Garry McGarry as Dr. Hastings
- Gertrude Hillman as Mrs. Ford
- Mrs. Charles Willard as Mrs. Slattery
