= Just Off Broadway (1924 film) =

1924 film by Edmund Mortimer

- Directed by: Edmund Mortimer
- Screenplay by: Frederic Hatton; Fanny Hatton
- Starring: John Gilbert; Marian Nixon; Trilby Clark; Pierre Gendron; Ben Hendricks Jr.
- Cinematography: G.O. Post
- Production company: Fox Film Corporation
- Distributed by: Fox Film Corporation
- Release date: January 20, 1924
- Running time: 60 minutes
- Country: United States
- Language: Silent (English intertitles)

Just Off Broadway is a 1924 American silent drama film directed by Edmund Mortimer and written by Frederic Hatton and Fanny Hatton. The film stars John Gilbert, Marian Nixon, Trilby Clark, Pierre Gendron, and Ben Hendricks Jr. The film was released on January 20, 1924, by Fox Film Corporation.

== Plot ==
As described in a film magazine review, Jean Lawrence, a dancer, jobless and hungry, faints in a restaurant just off Broadway. Rescued by Nan Norton, she becomes involved in a counterfeiting plot. A prowler is searching in Nan's apartment, who then turns off his flashlight steps out onto the balcony when Nan and Jean arrive. Ten seconds later, two detectives arrive, tell Nan that they "have the goods on her," and arrest Nan. "Smooth" Moran, Nan's sweetheart and leader of the gang, dies in London. He has made a friend and supposed acquaintance of Stephen Moore in Paris, and had asked him to look after Nan. In a series of hectic events, the crooks all seem to be detectives and the detectives crooks. The outcome is a perfectly legitimate romance between Jean and Stephen, who is not a crook but is a millionaire amateur detective.

== Cast ==
- John Gilbert as Stephen Moore
- Marian Nixon as Jean Lawrence
- Trilby Clark as Nan Norton
- Pierre Gendron as Florelle
- Ben Hendricks Jr. as Comfort

== Preservation ==
With no prints of Just Off Broadway located in any film archives, it is considered a lost film.
