= An Unwilling Hero =

1921 film

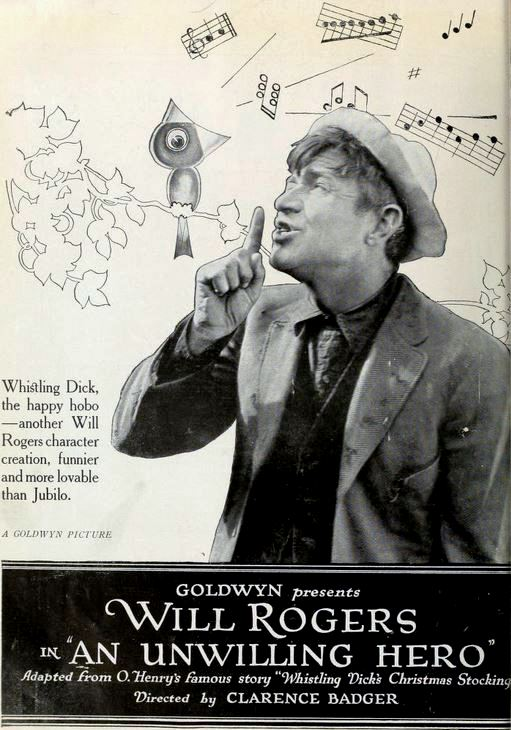
- Advertisement
- Directed by: Clarence G. Badger
- Screenplay by: Arthur F. Statter
- Based on: Whistling Dick's Christmas Stocking by O. Henry
- Produced by: Samuel Goldwyn
- Starring: Will Rogers; Molly Malone; John Bowers; Darrell Foss; Jack Curtis
- Cinematography: Marcel Le Picard
- Production company: Goldwyn Pictures
- Distributed by: Goldwyn Pictures
- Release date: May 8, 1921
- Running time: 50 minutes
- Country: United States
- Language: Silent (English intertitles)

An Unwilling Hero is a 1921 American silent comedy film directed by Clarence G. Badger and written by Arthur F. Statter. The film stars Will Rogers, Molly Malone, John Bowers, Darrell Foss, and Jack Curtis. The film was released on May 8, 1921, by Goldwyn Pictures.

== Cast ==
- Will Rogers as Dick
- Molly Malone as Nadine
- John Bowers as Hunter
- Darrell Foss as Richmond
- Jack Curtis as Boston Harry
- George Kunkel as Hobo
- Richard Johnson as Hobo
- Larry Fisher as Hobo
- Leo Willis as Hobo
- Nick Cogley as Servant
- Edward Kimball as Lovejoy
