= The Scarlet Honeymoon =

1925 film

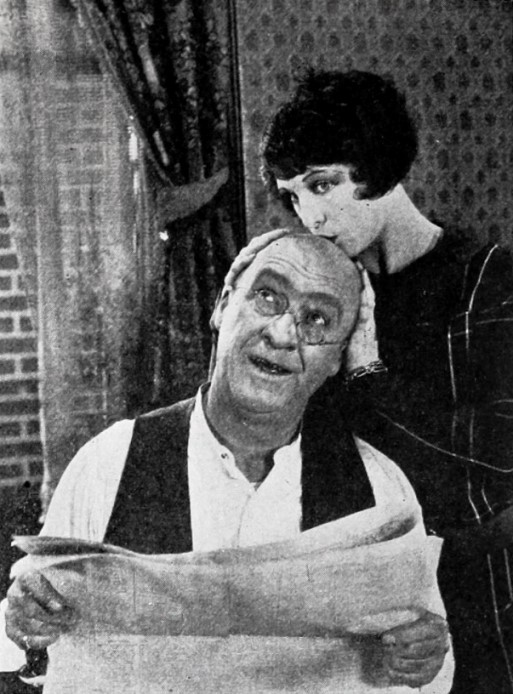
- Still with J. Farrell MacDonald and Shirley Mason
- Directed by: Alan Hale
- Written by: Fannie Davis; Edmund Goulding; E. Magnus Ingleton
- Produced by: William Fox
- Starring: Shirley Mason; Pierre Gendron; Allan Sears
- Cinematography: Joseph A. Valentine
- Production company: Fox Film
- Distributed by: Fox Film
- Release date: March 22, 1925
- Running time: 50 minutes
- Country: United States
- Language: Silent (English intertitles)

The Scarlet Honeymoon is a 1925 American silent drama film directed by Alan Hale and starring Shirley Mason, Pierre Gendron, and Allan Sears.

== Cast ==
- Shirley Mason as Kay Thorpe
- Pierre Gendron as Pedro Fernando
- Allan Sears as Harrison
- J. Farrell MacDonald as Joshua Thorpe
- Rose Tapley as Mamie Thorpe
- Bud Geary as Elmer Thorpe
- Eugenia Gilbert as Stella Thorpe
- Eric Mayne as Señor Fernando
- Eulalie Jensen as Señora Gernando

== Bibliography ==
- Matthew Kennedy. Edmund Goulding's Dark Victory: Hollywood's Genius Bad Boy. Terrace Books, 2004.
