= The Girl with the Jazz Heart =

1921 film

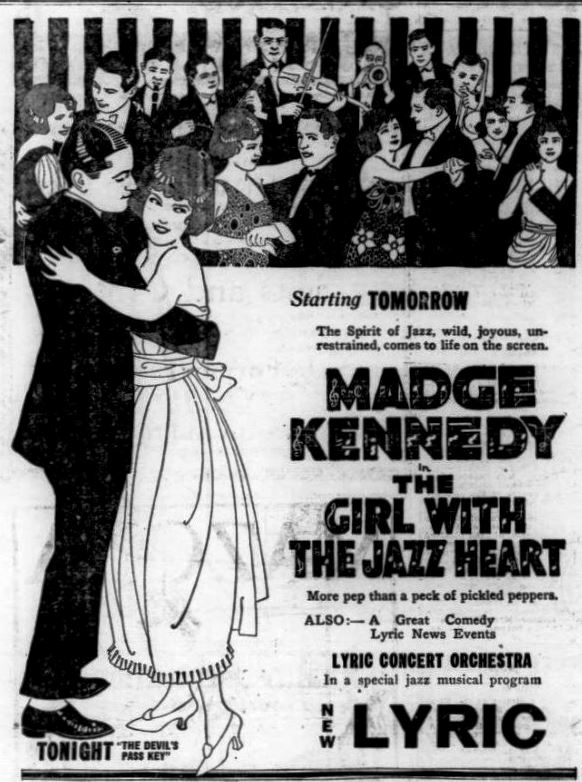
- Newspaper advertisement
- Directed by: Lawrence C. Windom
- Screenplay by: Philip Lonergan; George Mooser
- Based on: The Girl with the Jazz Heart by Robert T. Shannon
- Starring: Madge Kennedy; Joe King; Pierre Gendron; William Walcott; Helen Dubois; Robert Vaughn
- Cinematography: George Peters
- Production company: Goldwyn Pictures
- Distributed by: Goldwyn Pictures
- Release date: January 7, 1921
- Running time: 50 minutes
- Country: United States
- Language: Silent (English intertitles)

The Girl with the Jazz Heart is a 1921 American silent comedy film directed by Lawrence C. Windom and written by Philip Lonergan and George Mooser. The film stars Madge Kennedy, Joe King, Pierre Gendron, William Walcott, Helen Dubois, and Robert Vaughn. It was released on January 7, 1921, by Goldwyn Pictures.

== Cast ==
- Madge Kennedy as Kittie Swasher / Miriam Smith
- Joe King as Miles Sprague
- Pierre Gendron as Tommie Fredericks
- William Walcott as Miriam's Uncle
- Helen Dubois as Miriam's Aunt
- Robert Vaughn as Simeon Althoff
- Emil Hoch as Detective Quinn
- Lillian Worth as Camille
- Robert Emmett Tansey as Jimmie
- Dorothy Haight as Mamie
