= Goodwin's Weekly =

- Type: Weekly newspaper
- Owner: James T. Goodwin
- Editor: Charles Carroll Goodwin (d.1917)
- Founded: November 29, 1902
- Ceased publication: 1929
- Headquarters: Salt Lake City, Utah

Goodwin's Weekly was a periodical published in Salt Lake City, Utah from November 29, 1902 to 1929. It was renamed to The Citizen in 1919.

It termed itself "A Thinking Paper for Thinking People". Its editor was Charles Carroll Goodwin (d.1917); the owner and manager was Goodwin's son James T. Goodwin.
