= Adele Blood =

American actress

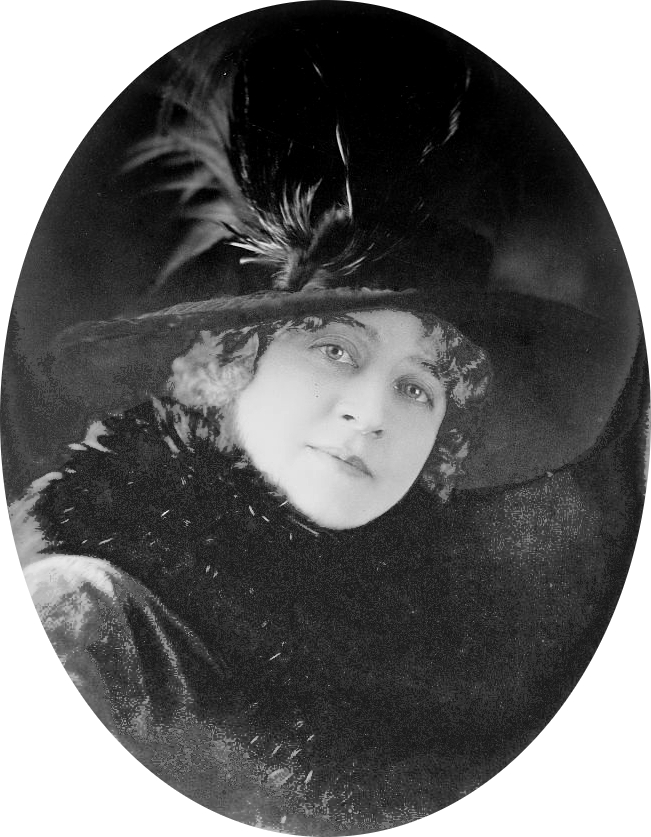
- Blood circa 1915
- Born: Adele Mary Blood; April 23, 1886; Alameda, California, U.S.
- Died: September 13, 1936 (aged 50); Harrison, New York, U.S.
- Other name: Adele Blood Hope
- Occupation: Actress

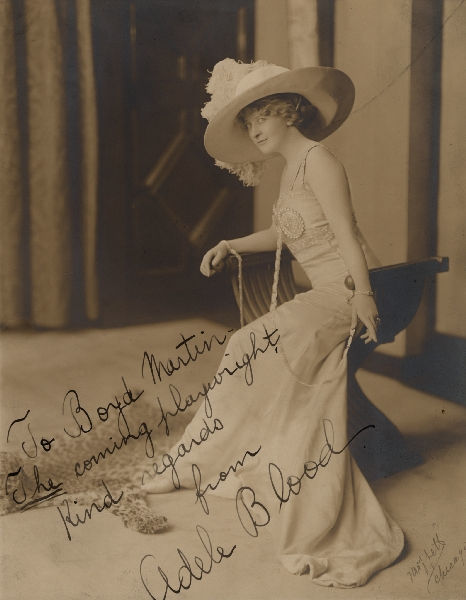
Adele Blood c. 1910

Adele Mary Blood (April 23, 1886 – September 13, 1936) was an American actress known for her work in silent film, vaudeville, and theater.

== Biography ==
Blood was born on April 23, 1886, in Alameda, California, to Ira E. Blood and Frances Emma Stewart. Her mother served as a member of the Alameda school department. In her youth, she was a talented equestrienne and held an interest in fashion.

=== Career ===
Blood's first public performance was at the California Theatre in San Francisco, portraying the role of Marguerite alongside Lewis Morrison in his production of Faust. Other theatrical presentations in which she starred include The Unmasking, All Rivers Meet The Sea, and The Picture of Dorian Gray. In the latter she was with the stock company of Edward Davis, with whom she would marry. Davis was a clergyman-actor who was formerly the pastor of the First Christian Church in Oakland, California. Their marriage was turbulent and Blood began divorce proceedings in 1914. Actress Jule Power was named as co-respondent in her suit. Davis responded by naming Governor Earl Brewer of Mississippi as co-respondent in counter charges against Blood. She finally won her divorce suit after which she left on a tour of the Orient. Following her divorce from Davis she was briefly married to Englishman Waddell Hope.

Blood featured in vaudeville shows across the country. She starred for five years in Everywoman. During her time on stage, she was affectionately referred to as "the most beautiful blonde on the American stage". She starred in two motion pictures: The Devil's Toy (1916) and The Riddle: Woman (1920).

By December 1917, Blood had officially retired. She was the devoted companion of her former foster mother, Susanna Holmes, known as the "Silver Queen." Blood was named an heiress to the Holmes' fortune. Blood eventually eschewed both wealth and social position, believing both led to a "philosophy of pessimism." However, she would later return to the stage after accepting an offer from the Oriental company of Tim Frawley.

In 1926, she met Colonel R.W. Castle in Kashmir. Castle was an English officer in the Indian service. The two were engaged and arranged a wedding in Calcutta.

== Death ==
On the night of September 13, 1936, Blood's 17-year-old daughter, Dawn, returned home after driving some friends to the railroad station. She found her mother speaking with two men in the living room. Shortly after her daughter's arrival, Blood excused herself upstairs. Several minutes later, a gunshot was heard from the bedroom. Dawn and the two others rushed upstairs to find Blood unconscious on the floor, having shot herself through the head with a .52 Caliber Revolver. She died in the hospital hours later in Port Chester, New York.

Adele's possessions were auctioned off and sold for $1,000.
