= Frank G. Abell =

American photographer

Franklin George Abell Jr.
- Born: 20 September 1844; Roscoe, Illinois
- Died: 20 July 1910 (aged 65); Tacoma, Washington
- Resting place: Portland, Oregon
- Occupation: Photographer

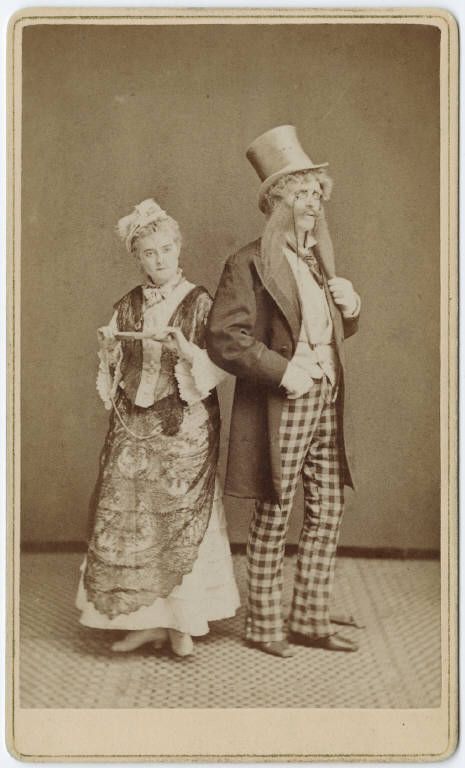
Photo of man and woman in striking attire

Franklin George Abell Jr. (September 20, 1844 – July 20, 1910) was an American photographer active in the western United States in the late 19th- and early 20th-centuries.

Abell was born in Roscoe, Illinois in 1844, to Franklin Abell Sr., a farmer, and Emily Bradley . He moved with his family to California in 1857 and joined the firm of William Shew in San Francisco in 1862 at age 18, learning the photography business for the next four years. He opened his own Abell's Star Gallery in Stockton in 1866 before moving back to San Francisco in 1867. The following year he traveled back up north through the Grass Valley, Red Bluff, and Yreka to Roseburg, Oregon in 1877.

He worked in Portland from 1878 to 1888, then moved back to San Francisco, before returning to Portland from 1897 to 1907.

Abel formed Abell & Welsh with John Oliver Welsh, Abell & Son with his son George L. Abell, and Abell-Herrin Co.

He photographed Oregon's first state governor, Joseph Lane, in 1879 or 1880.

He died in Tacoma, Washington in 1910.
