= Green Room Club (New York City) =

Defunct fraternal organization

The Green Room Club was a New York fraternal organization founded on December 20, 1902, for men involved in the dramatic arts. Its members included actors, managers, singers, composers, librettists, dramatists, other members of the theatrical profession, journalists, and lay members. Its purpose was to bring actors and managers into close personal relations.

== Library ==
By 1908, the club claimed that its library held the most complete collection of dramatic materials in the country and had a goal of building it into the most complete in the world. Aubrey Boucicault (son of Dion Boucicault and brother of Nina Boucicault) was the chairman of the library committee in 1906.

== Club founding ==
The Green Room Club was founded in 1902. Those signing the articles of incorporation were by William A. Brady, Milton Nobles, Thomas McGrath, Walter Fessler, F.F. MacKay, and Charles Dickson. Some of its founding members had been former members of the Actors Order of Friendship. They founded the Green Room with the aim of attracting younger actors. But later, the club became the primary social organization for managers and producers of theater, whose members included David Belasco and Daniel Frohman.

== Club dissolution ==
The Green Room Club disbanded on November 11, 1928, under financial duress. Among other things, the organization was in arrears on rent for its clubhouse located at 19 West 48th Street. Its landlord was Columbia University, which, at the time, was located in that area.

== Former addresses ==
- 1921: 139 West 47th Street
- 1938: 19 West 48th Street

== Former officers ==
The elected officials were titled Prompter (president), Call Boy (vice president), Copyist (secretary), and Angel (treasurer). Its board of directors were referred to as Board of Supers.

Prompters

- 1902–19??: William Aloysius Brady (1863–1950), actor, producer
- 19??–1908: Hollis Eli Cooley (1859–1918), theater manager
- 1908–1909: Herbert Hall Winslow (1865–1930), playwright
- 1909–1910: James O'Neill (1847–1920), actor, father of playwright Eugene O'Neill
- 1911–1912: George M. Cohan (1878–1942), entertainer, actor, playwright, composer, lyricists, dancer, producer
- 1912–19??: Frank G. Stanley ( –1921), theatrical insurance agent
- 1916–1920: Edwards Davis (1873–1936), actor
- circa 1920: Frank Bacon (1864–1922), actor, playwright
- 1922–1923: Frank Gillmore (1867–1943), actor, playwright
- 1924–1926: S. Jay Kaufman (1886–1957), stage columnist
- 1926–1928: Paul A. Meyer (1870–1953), co-publisher of Theater Magazine & theater impresario

== Other thespian clubs in New York City ==
- The Lambs
- Friars Club
- Strollers Club
- The Dunlap Society

Note: Neither the Green Room Club of London nor the Green Room Club of Melbourne was affiliated with the Green Room Club of New York.
