= Arthur F. Statter =

British screenwriter (1870–1937)

- Born: 1870; Carlisle, England
- Died: 26 August 1937 (aged 66–67); California, United States
- Occupation: Screenwriter
- Years active: 1916-1929

Arthur F. Statter (1870 – 26 August 1937), was an English screenwriter of the silent era. He wrote for more than 50 films between 1916 and 1929. Prior to his screenwriting career, he was an Assistant Secretary of the Treasury during Theodore Roosevelt's administration. He was born in Carlisle, England and died in California.

== Selected filmography ==
- Just Out of College (1920)
- An Unwilling Hero (1921)
- A Voice in the Dark (1921)
- The Man from Lost River (1921)
- All's Fair in Love (1921)
- Voices of the City (1921)
- The Poverty of Riches (1921)
- The Galloping Kid (1922)
- The Jilt (1922)
- A Wonderful Wife (1922)
- Trimmed (1922)
- Step on It! (1922)
- The Satin Girl (1923)
- Mine to Keep (1923)
- The Mine with the Iron Door (1924)
- The Better Man (1926)
- The Hero on Horseback (1927)
- Cyclone of the Range (1927)
- Painted Ponies (1927)
- A Trick of Hearts (1928)
- Midnight Life (1928)
- The Danger Rider (1928)
- After the Fog (1929)
