= Robert Cummings (actor, born 1865) =

American actor (1865–1949)

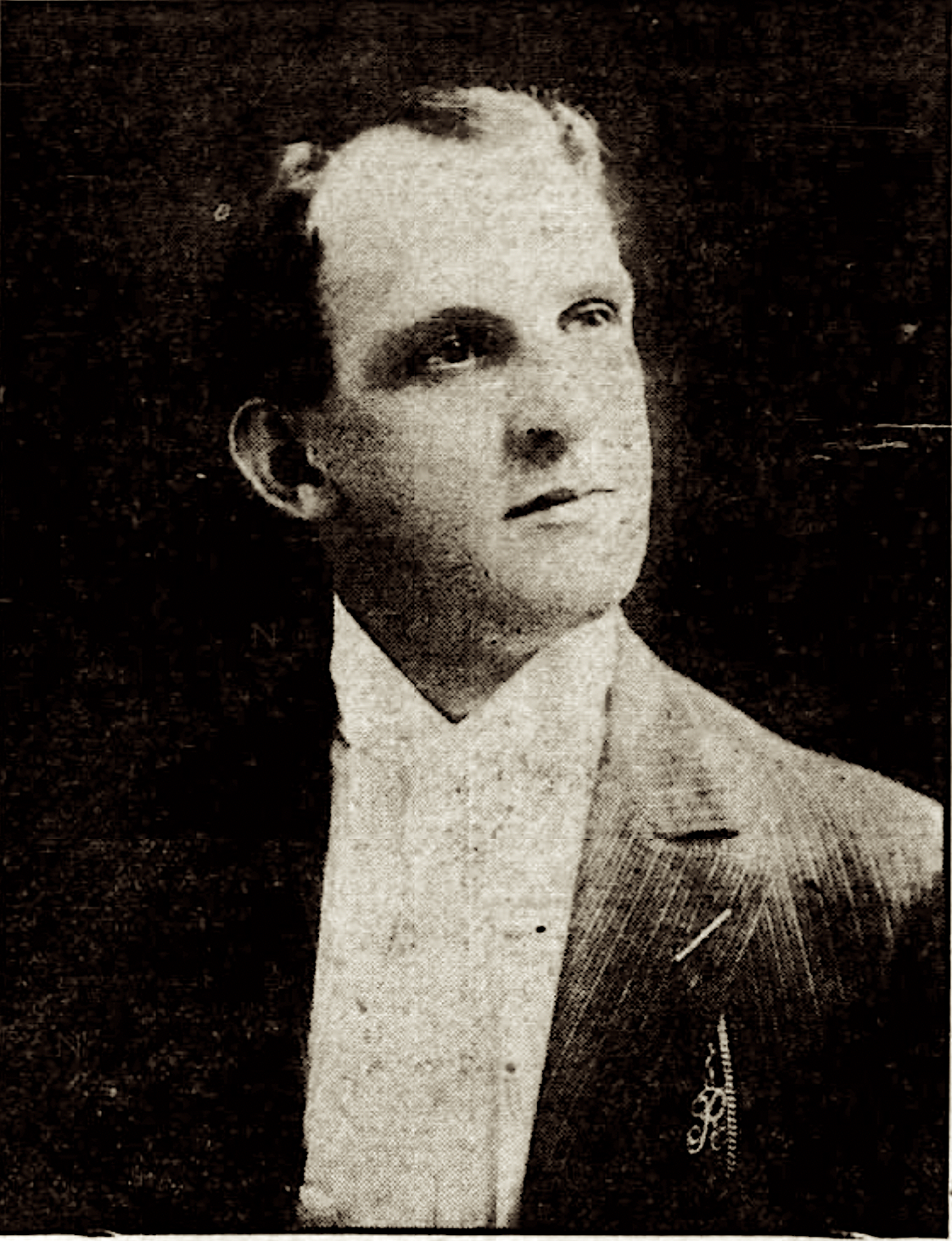
Robert Cummings in 1912.

Robert Cummings (February 8, 1865 – July 22, 1949) was an American actor active on the stage and in film. A native of Boston, Massachusetts, he was a member of the Cummings family of actors. He was active on the New York stage as early as 1883 when he performed in The Pavements of Paris at Niblo's Garden. In the 1890s he managed his own theatre troupe, the Cummings Stock Company, which was active both in the United States and Canada. He had a prolific stage career that lasted until his retirement in 1941. He starred in many Broadway productions, most often in plays but also in musicals. He also performed in American regional theatre and in national touring productions. While never completely abandoning his stage career, he starred in 28 silent films released between 1914 and 1920. In c. 1930 he moved to Los Angeles to work in sound films; making five pictures in the 1930s. He died in Los Angeles in 1949.

== Early life and career ==
Robert Cummings was born in Boston, Massachusetts on February 8, 1865. He moved with his family to California at a young age. His sister Ellen Cummings, and brother, Ralph Cummings, were also actors. In 1883 he performed in The Pavements of Paris at Niblo's Garden. In 1890 he toured as Humpy Logan in Master and Man. In 1893-1894 he was a member of Fanny Davenport's touring theatre troupe in which he performed the role of Dercetas in Victorien Sardou's Cléopâtre and Colometti in Sardou's La Tosca. In the summer of 1894 he performed with the Modern Star Players company as Arthur Carringford in Steele MacKaye's Hazel Kirke. After this he performed with Lothrop Stock Company in Boston.

In late 1894 Cummings performed on Broadway at the Fifth Avenue Theatre as Stradella in Sardou's Gismonda with Davemport in the title role. After the show closed in New York he toured in the production to the The Boston Theatre in February 1895. The show later toured to Philadelphia Chicago, and Cleveland among other American cities. In August and September 1895 he toured briefly in Sidney R. Ellis's Bonnie Scotland which included performances in Pittsburgh as well as New York state. By October 1895 he had joined the touring production of Palmer Cox's Brownies which was then playing in Trenton, New Jersey; performing the part of the demon Dragonfel. In this show Cummings traveled during the 1895-1896 and 1896-1897 seasons to theaters in Pennsylvania, Washington D.C., Illinois, Missouri, Kentucky, Ohio, Michigan, Minnesota, Wisconsin, New York, Massachusetts, Connecticut, Utah, Tennessee, California, Kansas, Iowa, and Nebraska. He was still in this touring production as late as March 1897 for performances in Atlanta, Georgia.

== Stock theatre and opera manager ==
After leaving Palmer Cox's Brownies tour, Cummings briefly took over the lease of Macauley's Theatre in Louisville, Kentucky. There he performed a series of plays with the Cummings Stock Company (CSC) which concluded with a production of Frou-Frou in May 1897. The company then played at the Academy of Music in Washington, D.C. in that same month before taking up a summer residence at the Cook Opera House in Rochester, New York. The CSC was owned by Robert's brother Ralph, and Robert served as the troupe's manager. In September 1897 the CSC performed there plays in Grand Rapids, Michigan, and then moved on to a residency at the Princess Theatre in Toronto, Canada. The company ended the year at the Berlin Opera House in Kitchener, Ontario.

In 1898 Cummings starred the CSC's productions of Steele MacKaye's Hazel Kirke (as Aaron Rodney), Charles Lawrence Young's Jim the Penman (as Redwood), Paul M. Potter's Trilby (as Taffy), Henry Arthur Jones's The Silver King (as Spider) Jones's Hoodman Blind (as Mark Lessard), and Henry Guy Carleton's Ambition. That year the CSC performed plays at the Grand Opera House in St. Catharines, Ontario, the Grand Opera House in Ottawa, and the Princess Theatre in Toronto. Cummings also established an opera troupe, the Cummings Opera Company, which played in Canadian theatres in 1898. The company put on Reginald De Koven's The Mandarin.

The CSC remained in residence at Toronto's Princess Theatre in 1899 with production like Cyrano de Bergerac and Don César de Bazan. In April 1899 Cummings was a last minute replacement in the lead part of Israel Cohen in a production of David Belasco's Men and Women in Detroit; a role he had previously performed with the CSC. In September 1899 he became a naturalized British citizen after filing papers in Canada. He was still leading CSC in Canada as late as April 1900. By late May 1900 he had left the organization and was working in vaudeville. By October 1900 he was once again managing the CSC, this time for performances in Fort Wayne, Indiana. He directed, produced, and starred in all of the plays put on by the company at this time. The CSC under Cumming's leadership subsequently performed in Salt Lake City in early 1901.

== 1900s performances ==
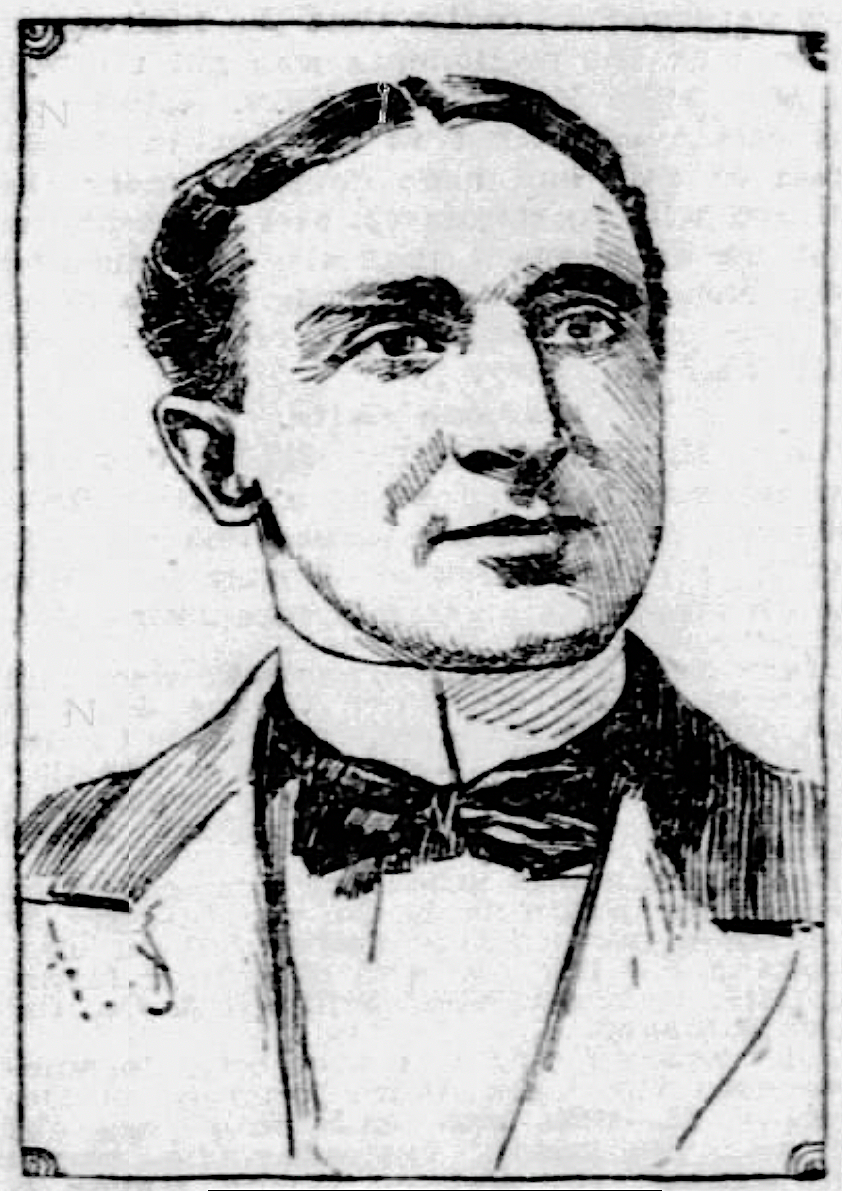
Sketch of Robert Cummings published in Detroit Free Press on May 27, 1900.

In April 1901 Cummings joined David Belasco's stock theatre troupe which was then in residence at the Central Theatre in San Francisco. He made his debut with this group as Flavian in Alexandre Soumet's The Gladiator. Other roles with this group included Alastor in Ingomar the Barbarian, Brutus in Shakespeare's Julius Caesar, Col. Ezra Mason in Harry P. Mawson's A Fair Rebel, Joe Morgan in William W. Pratt's Ten Nights in a Barroom, John Warfield in Charles Dazey's The War of Wealth, Detective Dick Brummage in Edward M. Alfriend's The Great Diamond Robbery, Chevalier de Vaudry in Adolphe d'Ennery's The Two Orphans, Herod in Edward Elsner's A Voice From the Wilderness, and Jacob McClosky in Dion Boucicault's The Octoroon. By November 1901 he had left San Francisco and was in Brooklyn, New York performing as a member of the stock company at the Columbia Theatre as Paul de Silveria in The White Squadron.

In January 1902 Cummings was engaged at Blaney's Theater in Brooklyn as Marquis de St. Evremonde in Freeman Wills's The Only Way (based on A Tale of Two Cities). In June 1902 he appeared on Broadway at the American Theatre (AT) as Marshal Richelieu in Lorraine Hollis's Jeanne du Barri. He returned to the AT as Lord Robert Ure in Hall Caine's The Christian (1902), Blanchard in David Belasco's The Stranglers of Paris (1902), Faust in Lawrence Marsden's Faust (1902), Hugh Ritson in Lawrence Marston's The Penitent (1903), Bill Sikes in Charles E. Callahan's stage adaptation of Oliver Twist (1903), Captain Brigaud in Charles H. Longdon's The Dangers of Paris (1903), Lucine Bonaparte in Émile Bergerat's More Than Queen (1903), James Haycraft in Hal Reid's A Working Girl's Wrong (1903), and Staunton Mordaunt in Charlotte Blair Parker's For Home and Honor (1903). In the summer of 1903 he was engaged at Proctor's 58th Street Theatre, and later that year he appeared at the Fifth Avenue Theatre in B. B. Valentine's A Southern Romance.

In 1904 Cummings toured as Robert Dillon in Lawrence Marston's The Little Mother. In November 1904 he was engaged at the Garrick Theatre in Philadelphia as Bleipyros in Austin Page's The Eternal Feminine which was taken from the German language play by Robert Misch. In the first portion of 1905 he was a member of the stock theatre company at the Yorkville Theatre in New York City. Some of his roles with this company were Sir John Oxon in Stephen Townsend and Frances Hodgson Burnett's A Lady of Quality and Spider in The Silver King. Later in the year he performed at Proctor's 125th Street Theatre in Squire Kate was Jessie Bonstelle in the title role. and on

In 1905-1906 Cummings performed on Broadway at Proctor's Fifth Avenue Theatre in several productions; including in Bronson Howard's The Banker's Daughter (1905, as Count De Carojac) Herbert Beerbohm Tree's version of Oliver Twist (1905, as Monks), Shakespeare's The Merchant of Venice (1906, as Duke of Venice), The Missourians (1906, as Stormy Jordan), and Lawrence Marston and R. E. H. Greene's Jeanne D'arc (1906, as Thouars), In October 1906 he appeared at the Princess Theatre as Lon Anderson in the world premiere of William Vaughn Moody's The Great Divide. The following month he appeared at the Majestic Theatre (MT) on Broadway as Schram in Robert Browning's in Pippa Passes. He returned to the MT in 1907 as Confederate Soldier in Louis Evan Shipman's On Parole; a part he played while simultaneously appearing in the long running production of The Great Divide.

Cummings became a member of the stock company of Chestnut Street Theatre (CST) in Philadelphia in September 1907. Some of the roles he played at the CST included Colonel Pasquale in Bernard Rolt's musical Glittering Gloria (1907), Brinker in Haddon Chambers's A Modern Magdalen (1907), Kleschna in C.M.S. McLellan's Leah Kleschna (1907), Cascart in Pierre Berton's Zaza (1907), Prince Gabriel in George Barr McCutcheon's Graustark (1908), the Cardinal in Robert Marshall's A Royal Family (1908), and Louis XI in Justin Huntly McCarthy's If I Were King (1908). By May 1908 he was back in New York City performing in The Walls of Jericho at the Harlem Opera House. Later that year he returned to Broadway in Charles Rann Kennedy's The Winterfeast at the Savoy Theatre. In January 1909 he portrayed the villain Varsova in the premiere of John Luther Long's Kassa at the National Theatre in Washington, D.C. He remained with the production when it transferred to Broadway's Liberty Theatre. His other Broadway credits in 1909 included Benjamin Wright in The Awakening of Helena Richie at the Savoy Theatre, and Judge Pleydell in Cameo Kirby at the Hackett Theatre.

== 1910s stage performances and silent film career ==
In early 1910 Cummings was once again a member of the repertory theatre company at the Chestnut St. Theatre in Philadelphia. By October 1910 he was back in New York City performing as Time in Maurice Maeterlinck's The Blue Bird at the New Theatre. In 1911 he returned to the Fifth Avenue Theatre in Oliver White's Man to Man. After this he performed in vaudeville in the B. F. Keith Circuit with Frank Keenan as his partner. In 1912 he toured in the vaudeville show The Butcher and the Baron, worked in stock theatre with the Poli's Players in Hartford, Connecticut. In late 1912 he returned to Broadway as Mr. Jamison in Carlyle Moore's Stop Thief at the Gaiety Theatre; a show which ran into 1913. By May 1913 he had resumed performing with Poli's Players in Harford. In July 1913 he toured with this group to Washington D.C. He then toured nationally in Stop Thief in the 1913-1914 season.

In 1914 Cummings was hired by the All-Star Feature Corporation to appear in the silent film The Jungle; an adaptation of the book of the same name by Upton Sinclair. That same year he made two film with the Famous Players Film Company: The Spitfire and The Little Gray Lady. In 1915 he appeared in the Fox Film Corporation movie From the Valley of the Missing, and the Paramount Pictures film The Running Fight. In 1916 he starred in the Metro Pictures films The Wall Between, A Million a Minute, The Brand of Cowardice, The Awakening of Helena Richie, and Romeo and Juliet. He made many films with the World Film Company; including Alias Jimmy Valentine (1915), The Cub (1915), The Ivory Snuff Box (1915), The Heart of the Blue Ridge (1915), Camille (1915), Fruits of Desire (1916), The Yellow Passport (1916), Paying the Price (1916), Betsy Ross (1917), and The Trap (1918).

From 1917-1920 Cummings made films for a variety of studios. With the Arrow Film Corporation he portrayed Porphyus in Crime and Punishment (1917) after the novel by Fyodor Dostoevsky. For Selznick Pictures he portrayed Horace Benton in The Law of Compensation (1917) which starred actress Norma Talmadge. He played the role of Phineas Bennett in the Paramount Pictures film The Song of Songs (1918). For Vitagraph Studios he made The Golden Shower (1919). He starred in the Fox Film Corporation movies A Rich Man's Plaything (1917) and The Face at Your Window (1920).

While working as a silent film actor, Cummings continued to appear on the stage. His Broadway credits in the late 1910s included Ernest Wilkes's Broken Threads (1917) at the Fulton Theatre; Robert Housum's The Gipsy Trail (1917-1918) at the Plymouth Theatre; Percival Knight's A Trench Fantasy (1918, as the Shadow) at the Plymouth Theatre; W. D. Hepenstall and Whitford Kane's Dark Rosaleen at the Belasco Theatre; and Montague Glass and Jules Eckert Goodman's His Honor: Abe Potash (1919-1920) at the Bijou Theatre.

== Later life and career ==
Cummings portrayed Officer Conlon in Augustus Thomas's Nemesis at the Garrick Theatre in Philadelphia and on Broadway at the Hudson Theatre in 1921. He returned to Broadway in the 1922 musical revue Frank Fay's Fables which was staged at the Park Theatre by its creator, the actor Frank Fay. This was followed by performances in the Broadway productions of Louis Evan Shipman's Fools Errant (1922, as Dr. Graham) at Maxine Elliott's Theatre; Channing Pollock's The Fool (1922-1923, as Charlie Benfield) at Times Square Theatre; George M. Cohan's The Song and Dance Man (1923-1924, as Jim Craig) at the Hudson Theatre; and Don Mullally's The Desert Flower (1924, as Mike Dyer) at the Longacre Theatre.

Cummings remained active on the New York stage into the 1930s. His other Broadway credits included Edgar Selwyn's Something To Brag About (1925, as Sam Clough) at the Booth Theatre; Denison Clift's The Woman Disputed (1926-1927, as Sergeant Bauer) at the Forrest Theatre; Bayard Veiller's The Trial of Mary Dugan (1927-1928, as Police Inspector Hunt) at the National Theatre; Morgan Wallace's Congratulations (1929, as Peter Johnson) at the National Theatre; Samuel Shipman's She Means Business (1931, as Ware) at the Ritz Theatre; Edwin L. Barker and Albert Wineman Barker's The Man on Stilts (1931, as Senator Abner Tarbottom) at the Plymouth Theatre; and the musical Murder at the Vanities (1933-1934, as Jack Purdy) at the New Amsterdam Theatre.

Cummings moved to Los Angeles, California in the early 1930s to work in sound films. He appeared in a handful of pictures in minor or supporting parts in films like Convict's Code (1930) and Lady Be Careful (1936). He also appeared in local plays in Los Angeles, and retired from performance in 1941. He died in Los Angeles on July 22, 1949.

== Filmography ==
- The Jungle (1914, as Connor)
- The Spitfire (1914, as Tracy)
- The Little Gray Lady (1914, as Richard Graham)
- Alias Jimmy Valentine (1915, as Doyle)
- From the Valley of the Missing (1915, as Lem Crabbe)
- The Running Fight (1915, as Peter V. Wilkinson)
- The Cub (1915, as Captain White)
- The Ivory Snuff Box (1915, as Prefect of Police)
- The Heart of the Blue Ridge (1915, as Dan Hodges)
- Camille (1915, as Monsieur Duval)
- Fruits of Desire (1916, as Thomas Henley)
- The Yellow Passport (1916, as Ivan)
- The Wall Between (1916, as Col. Dickinson)
- A Million a Minute (1916, as Timothy O'Farrell)
- Paying the Price (1916, as General Corbin)
- Romeo and Juliet (1916, as Friar Laurence)
- The Brand of Cowardice (1916, as Colonel Gordon West)
- The Awakening of Helena Richie (1916, as Lloyd Pryor)
- Crime and Punishment (1917, as Porphyus)
- The Law of Compensation (1917, as Horace Benton)
- Betsy Ross (1917, as Joel Radley)
- A Rich Man's Plaything (1917, as 'Smash' Regan)
- The Song of Songs (1918, as Phineas Bennett)
- The Trap (1918, as David Shaw)
- The Devil's Playground (1918, as The Father)
- Virtuous Men (1919, as Robert Brummon)
- The Golden Shower (1919, as Broadway Al' Campbell)
- The Face at Your Window (1920, as Kravo)
- The Convict's Code (1930, as Gov. Johnson)
- It Happened in Paris (1932)
- Make a Million (1935, as Dean)
- I'd Give My Life (1936)
- Lady Be Careful (1936, as First Officer)
- The Outer Gate (1937, as Judge)
