= Emmett Corrigan =

Dutch-born American actor

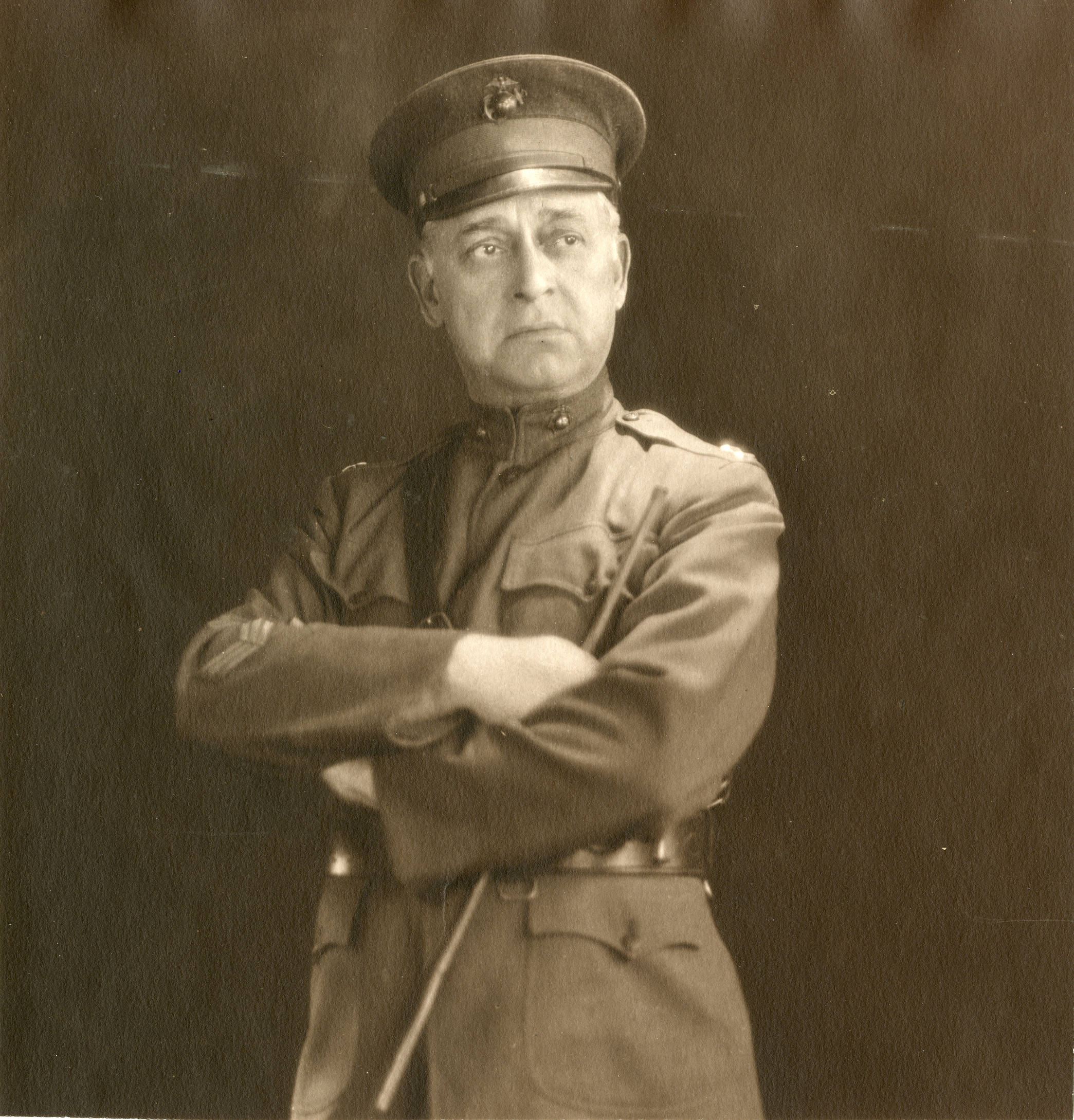
- Born: Antoine Zilles; June 5, 1867; Amsterdam, Holland Netherlands
- Died: October 29, 1932 (aged 65); Los Angeles, California
- Other names: Anthony Zilles; E. Corrigan; Emmet Corrigan
- Occupation: Actor
- Years active: 1880s to 1932
- Spouse(s): Myra Corrigan(d.1896 suicide); Molly Ilene Mack

Emmett Corrigan (born Antoine Zilles; June 5, 1867 – October 29, 1932) was a Dutch-born American stage and screen actor. Various sources give his birth year as 1867, 1868 and 1871.

Corrigon was born as Antoine Zilles in Amsterdam, Holland, and his career extended from the silent era to the early sound years. He originally studied for the priesthood and also debuted on stage at Baltimore at age fourteen. He later attended Ilchester College. Much stage work appearing as Sheik Ilderim on Broadway in Ben-Hur in 1899 and as Simonides in a 1900 revival of Ben-Hur. He did much touring in stock companies up until he started appearing in silent films. In 1921 he starred as John Kallan in Augustus Thomas's Nemesis at the Garrick Theatre in Philadelphia and on Broadway at the Hudson Theatre. One of his last stage appearances was as Captain Flagg in 1925 in a San Francisco stage version of What Price Glory?.

On October 29, 1932, Corrigan died of a heart attack while he was watching a card game at the Maskers Club in Hollywood. He was 65.

== Selected Stage Appearances ==
- The Deep Purple (1910-1911)
- The Yellow Ticket (1914)

== Selected filmography ==
- Greater Love Hath No Man (1915)
- Husband and Wife (1916)
- The Rendezvous (1923)
- Corsair (1931)
- The Beast of the City (1932)
- The World and the Flesh (1932)
- The Night Mayor (1932) *uncredited
- The Golden West (1932)
- Man Against Woman (1932)
- Silver Dollar (1932)
- Me and My Gal (1932) *uncredited
- The Bitter Tea of General Yen (1932)
