= Eleanor Woodruff =

American actress

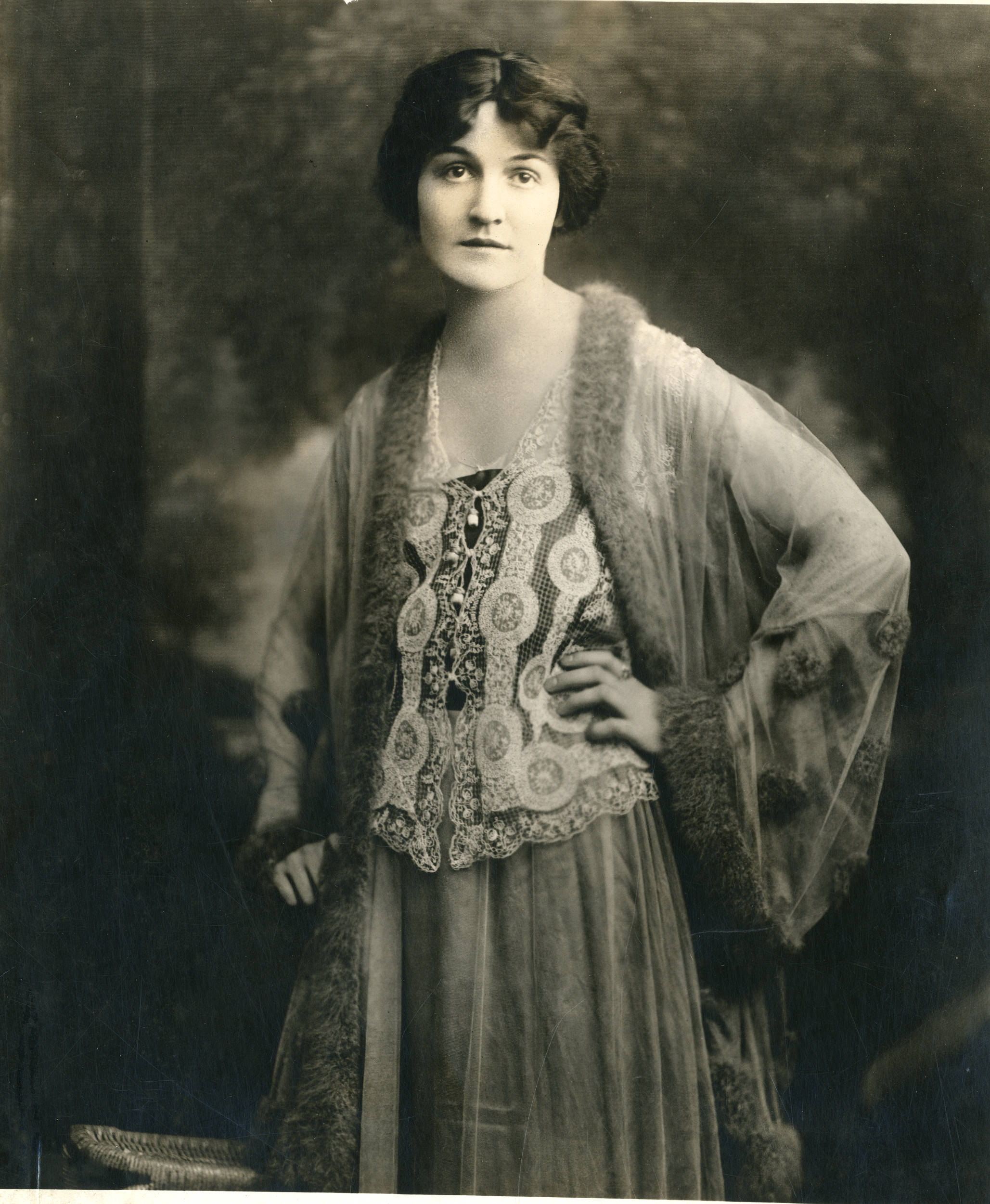
- Woodruff in 1924
- Born: September 12, 1891; Towanda, Pennsylvania
- Died: October 7, 1980 (aged 89); Princeton, New Jersey
- Education: National School of Oratory
- Occupation: actress
- Years active: 1911-1931

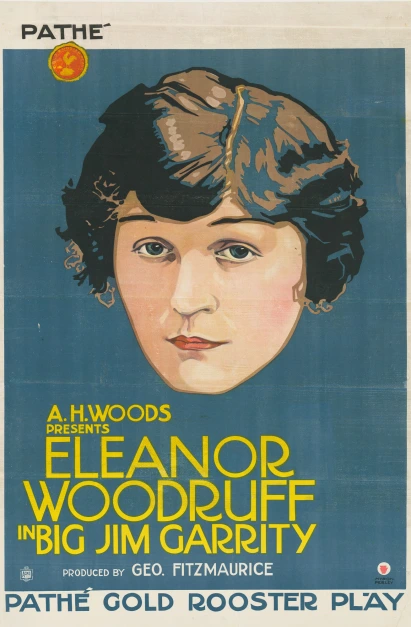
Lobby poster from Pathé

Eleanor Stark Woodruff (September 12, 1891- October 7, 1980) was an American stage and silent screen actress.

== Life ==
Woodruff was born in Towanda, Pennsylvania in 1891. Her family were wealthy and she was educated at the National School of Oratory. Woodruff was employed by the Philadelphia Orpheum Stock Company and the Schubert Organisation, before embarking on a silent film career from 1913 to 1922. She concurrently appeared on Broadway from 1911 to 1931. In 1921 she starred as Grace Lonarby in Augustus Thomas's Nemesis at the Garrick Theatre in Philadelphia and on Broadway at the Hudson Theatre.

Woodruff was termed 'The Ethel Barrymore of the Screen' in some advertisements because her looks, dress and mannerisms mimicked the famous actress. She appeared in the original Perils of Pauline serial with Pearl White. Amongst the companies she worked for were Pathé, World-Selznick, Rex and Vitagraph, and she was one of the highest paid stars at Pathé.

She retired from acting in 1931 after her marriage to stockbroker Dorsey Richardson, who was later the economic advisor to Presidents Kennedy and Johnson. They had a daughter, Rosalie Richardson.

Woodruff died in 1980.

== Filmography ==
- The Finger of Fate (1913)(*short)
- The Widow and the Widower (1913)(*short)
- The Hunger of the Heart (1913)(*short)
- A Woman's Way (1913)(*short)
- The Depth of Hate (1913)(*short)
- Two Mothers (1913)(*short)
- In the Haunts of Fear (1913)(*short)
- Her Hour (1913)(*short)
- A Sword of Damocles (1914)(*short)
- In the Mesh of Her Hair (1914)(*short)
- The Winning Hand (1914)(*short)
- The Second Generation (1914)(*short)
- The Perils of Pauline (1914)
- A Leech of the Industry (1914)(*short)
- The Stain (1914)
- All Love Excelling (1914)(*short)
- The Last Volunteer (1914)
- The Ticket-of-Leave Man (1914)
- The Bomb Boy (1914)(*short)
- Rod of Wrath (1915)(*short)
- His Bunkie (1915)(*short)
- From the Dregs (1915)(*short)
- West Wind (1915)(*short)
- The Heights of Hazard (1915)
- Colton USN (1915)
- The Island of Surprise (1916)
- Britton of the Seventh (1916)(*short)
- The Hero of Submarine D-2 (1916)
- Out of the Quagmire (1916)(*short)
- Big Jim Garrity (1916)
- Jaffery (1916)
- The Weakness of Man (1916)
- A Pasteboard Crown (1922)
