= Pedro de Cordoba =

American actor (1881-1950)

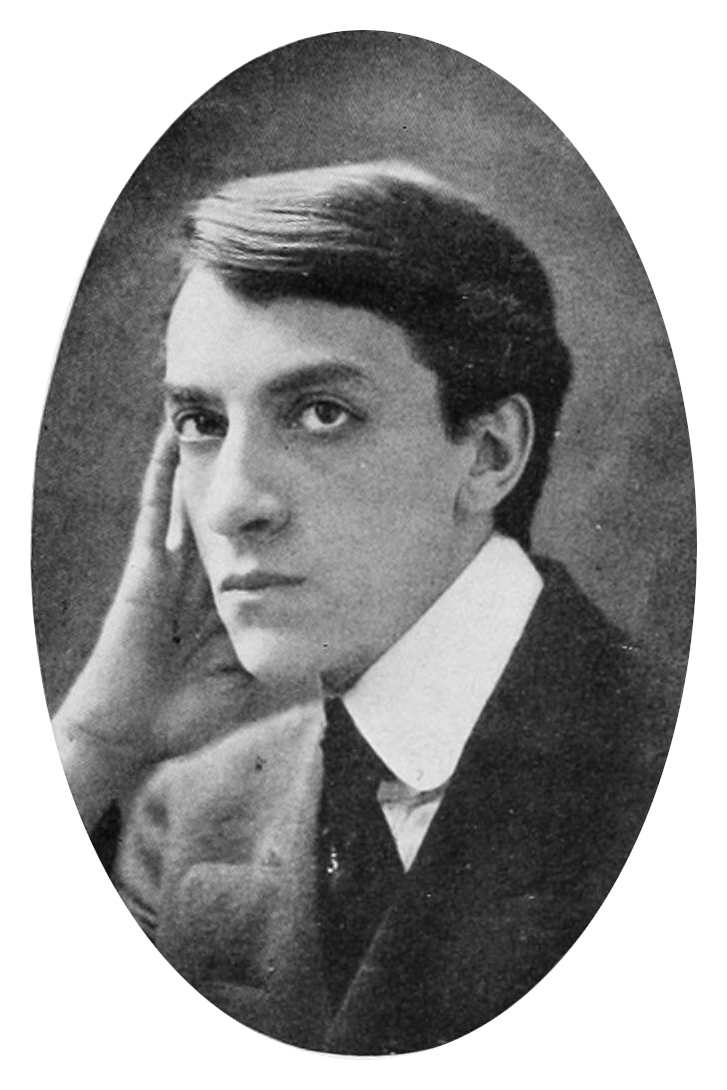
- Cordoba, c. 1909
- Born: September 28, 1881; New York City, US
- Died: September 16, 1950 (aged 68); Sunland, California, US
- Resting place: Holy Cross Cemetery, Culver City
- Occupation: Actor
- Years active: 1901–1951
- Spouses: Antoinette Glover (m. 1917; died 1921) Eleanor M. Nolan (m. 1928)

Pedro de Cordoba (September 28, 1881 – September 16, 1950) was an American actor.

== Early life ==
De Cordoba was born in New York City to Cuban and French parents.

== Career ==
De Cordoba was a classically trained theatre actor who confessed he did not enjoy appearing in silent films nearly as much as he liked working on stage, but his career during the silent film era was extensive.

In 1913 he was a member of the resident summer stock cast at Elitch Theatre in Denver, Colorado. In 1921 he starred as Mr. Jovaine in Augustus Thomas's Nemesis at the Garrick Theatre in Philadelphia and on Broadway at the Hudson Theatre.

=== Hollywood ===
His first film was Cecil B. DeMille's version of Carmen (1915), and he soon became a regular leading man in Hollywood. His Broadway career cast him with such stage actresses as Jane Cowl and Katharine Cornell.

In the sound era, his deeply resonant speaking voice made him perfectly suited to talking pictures and was active as a character actor in Hollywood, from the mid-1930s through to the end of his life. He was most often cast as aristocratic, or clerical characters of Hispanic origin, as in The Keys of the Kingdom (1944), because of his last name as well as his royal bearing. On rare occasions, he would be cast in the role of a villain. His "living skeleton" sideshow character hides fugitive Robert Cummings (and Priscilla Lane) in his carnival wagon overnight in the Alfred Hitchcock film Saboteur (1942).

In 1932 he portrayed Collatine in the Broadway production of Lucrece.

== Personal life ==
Cordoba was married Antoinette Glover in 1917, until her death in 1921. He married Eleanor M. Nolan in 1928, and they had six children together.

He was a devout Catholic and served for a time as president of the Catholic Actors Guild of America.

== Death ==
Cordoba died in his home in the Sunland neighborhood of Los Angeles in 1950, aged 68. His remains are interred at Holy Cross Cemetery in Culver City.

== Selected filmography ==
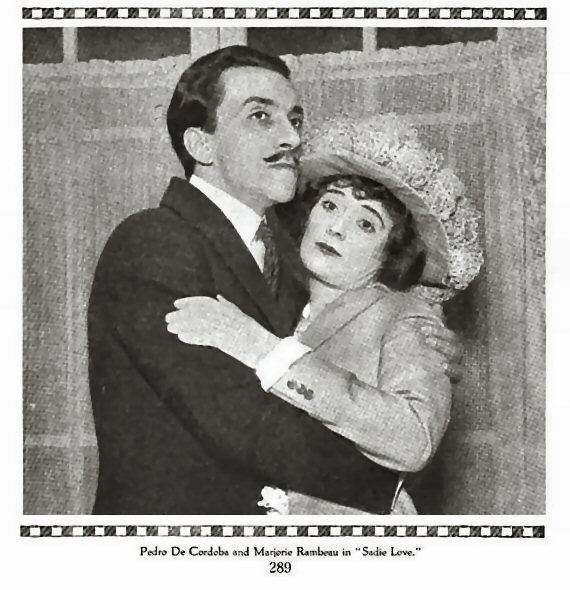
With Marjorie Rambeau in the play Sadie Love by Avery Hopwood (1915), later made into a 1919 film starring Billie Burke.

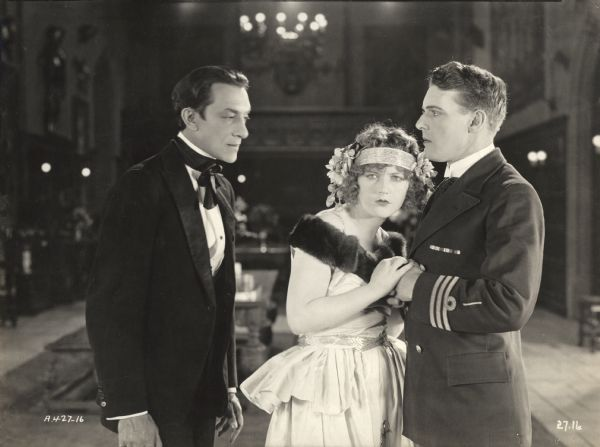
Pedro de Cordoba, Marion Davies, and Forrest Stanley in a scene still from the 1922 silent drama The Young Diana.

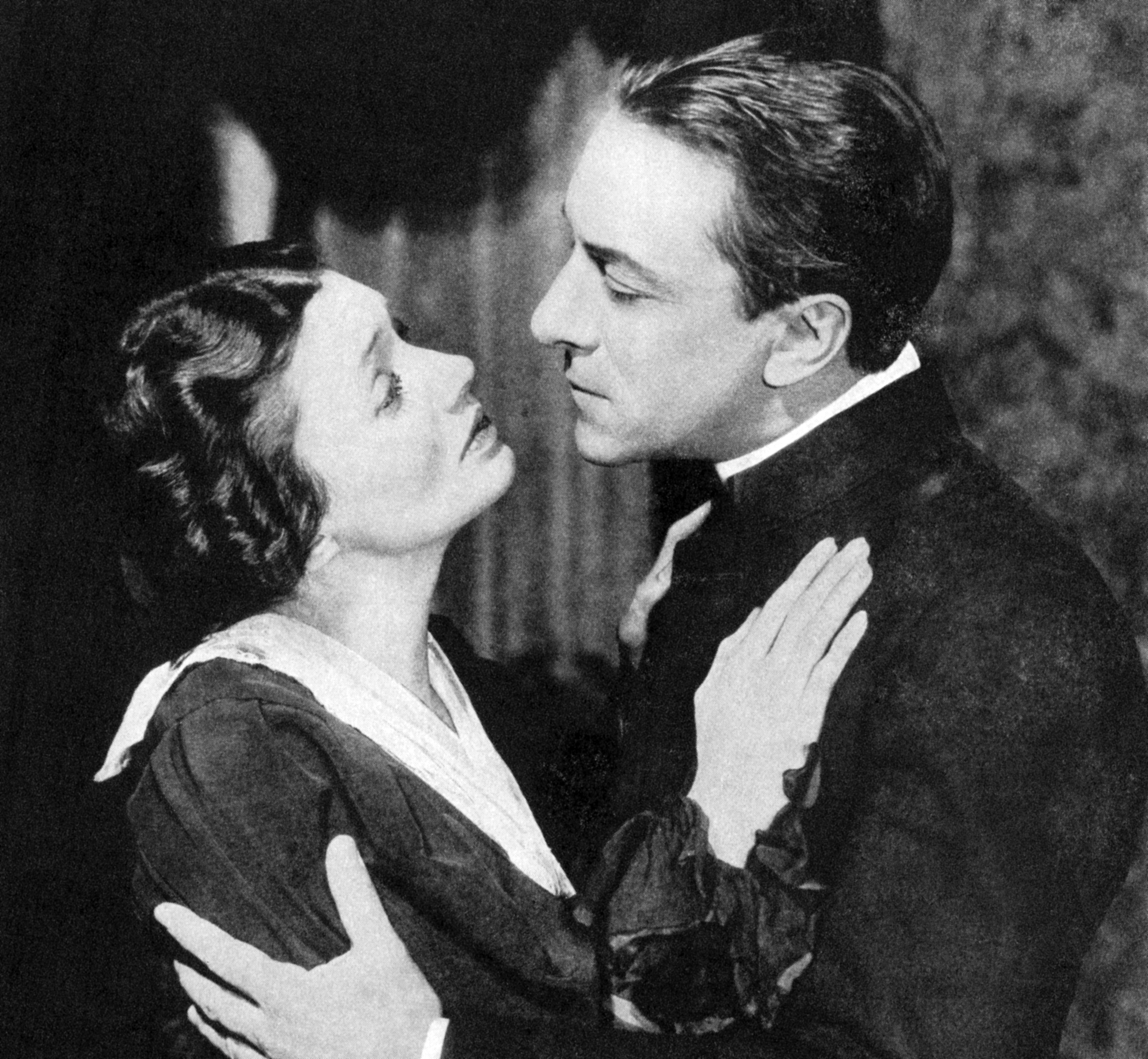
Katharine Cornell and Pedro de Cordoba in the 1924 Broadway production of George Bernard Shaw's Candida

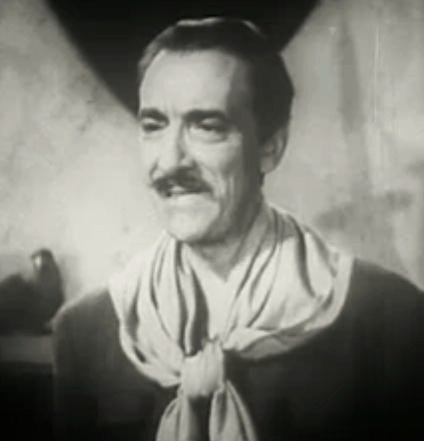
As Antoine in Escape to Paradise (1939)

=== Silent film ===
Year	Film	Role	Director	Notes
1915	The Little White Violet	Phillip Randall	Lucius J. Henderson	Short
1915	Jeanne of the Woods	Hugh Travers N.W.M.P.	Lucius J. Henderson	Short
1915	Carmen	Escamillo	Cecil B. DeMille	
1915	Temptation	Julian	Cecil B. DeMille	
1916	Maria Rosa	Ramon	Cecil B. DeMille	
1916	Just a Song at Twilight	Carlysle Turner	Burton L. King; Carlton S. King	
1917	Sapho	Flamant	Hugh Ford	
1917	One Law for Both	Count de Fernac	Ivan Abramson	
1917	Barbary Sheep	Benchaalal	Maurice Tourneur	
1917	Runaway Romany	Zinga	George W. Lederer	
1918	A Daughter of the Old South	Pedro de Alvarez	Émile Chautard	
1919	The New Moon	Prince Michail Koloyar	Chester Withey	
1920	The Dark Mirror	Mario	Charles Giblyn	
1920	The World and His Wife	Don Severo	Robert G. Vignola	
1920	The Sin That Was His	Father Aubert	Hobart Henley	
1921	The Inner Chamber	Dr. George Danilo	Edward José	
1922	The Young Diana	Dr. Dimitrius	Robert G. Vignola	
1922	When Knighthood Was in Flower	Duke of Buckingham	Robert G. Vignola	
1923	Enemies of Women	Atilio Castro	Alan Crosland	
1923	Fires of Fate	Prince Ibrahim	Tom Terriss	
1923	The Purple Highway	Joe Renard	Henry Kolker	
1923	I Will Repay	Paul Deroulede	Henry Kolker	
1924	The Desert Sheik	Prince Ibrahim	Tom Terriss	
1924	The Bandolero	Dorando	Tom Terriss	
1925	The New Commandment	Picard	Howard Higgin	

=== Sound film ===
Year	Film	Role	Director	Notes
1935	The Crusades	Karakush	Cecil B. DeMille	
1935	Condemned to Live	Dr. Anders Bizet	Frank R. Strayer	
1935	Captain Blood	Don Diego	Michael Curtiz	
1935	Professional Soldier	Stefan Bernaido	Tay Garnett	
1936	Rose of the Rancho	Gomez	Marion Gering	
1936	Robin Hood of El Dorado	Hacendado Wanting to Cooperate	William A. Wellman	uncredited
1936	Moonlight Murder	Swami	Edwin L. Marin	
1936	Frankie and Johnny	Bit part	Chester Erskine; John H. Auer	uncredited
1936	Trouble for Two	Sergei	J. Walter Ruben	
1936	The Devil-Doll	Charles Matin	Tod Browning	
1936	Anthony Adverse	Brother Francois	Mervyn LeRoy	
1936	His Brother's Wife	Dr. Capolo	W. S. Van Dyke	
1936	Ramona	Father Salvierderra	Henry King	
1936	The Garden of Allah	Gardener	Richard Boleslawski	uncredited
1937	Maid of Salem	Mr. Morse	Frank Lloyd	
1937	Girl Loves Boy	Signor Montefiori	W. Duncan Mansfield	
1937	Damaged Goods	Dr. Edward B. Walker	Phil Goldstone	
1937	The Firefly	Spanish General	Robert Z. Leonard	uncredited
1938	International Settlement	Maurice Zabello	Eugene Forde	
1938	Gold Diggers in Paris	Mons. Cambret	Busby Berkeley	uncredited
1938	Keep Smiling	J. Howard Travers	Monty Banks	
1938	Storm Over Bengal	Abdul Mir	Sidney Salkow	
1938	Dramatic School	LeMaistre in "Joan of Arc"	Robert B. Sinclair	uncredited
1938	Heart of the North	Father Claverly	Lewis Seiler	
1939	Devil's Island	Marcal	William Clemens	
1939	Winner Take All	Pantrelli	Otto Brower	
1939	Juarez	Riva Palacio	William Dieterle	
1939	Man of Conquest	Oolooteka	George Nicholls Jr.	
1939	Chasing Danger	Gurra Din	Ricardo Cortez	
1939	Five Came Back	Latin Ambassador	John Farrow	uncredited
1939	Range War	Padre Jose	Lesley Selander	
1939	Law of the Pampas	Jose Valdez	Nate Watt	
1939	Charlie Chan in City in Darkness	Antoine	Herbert I. Leeds	
1939	Escape to Paradise	Don Miguel	Erle C. Kenton	
1939	The Light That Failed	Monsieur Binat	William A. Wellman	
1940	My Favorite Wife	Dr. Kohlmar	Garson Kanin	
1940	Earthbound	Minister	Irving Pichel	
1940	The Ghost Breakers	Havez	George Marshall	
1940	The Sea Hawk	Capt. Mendoza	Michael Curtiz	
1940	South of Pago Pago	Chief	Alfred E. Green	
1940	Before I Hang	Victor Sondini	Nick Grinde	
1940	The Mark of Zorro	Don Miguel	Rouben Mamoulian	
1940	The Phantom Submarine	Henri Jerome	Charles Barton	
1941	Romance of the Rio Grande	Don Fernando de Vega	Herbert I. Leeds	
1941	Blood and Sand	Don Jose Alvarez	Rouben Mamoulian	
1941	Million Dollar Baby	Verali, Orchestra Conductor	Curtis Bernhardt	uncredited
1941	Aloma of the South Seas	Raaiti	Alfred Santell	
1941	The Corsican Brothers	Count Gravini	Gregory Ratoff	
1941	Paris Calling	Speaker	Edwin L. Marin	uncredited
1942	Son of Fury: The Story of Benjamin Blake	Feenou	John Cromwell	
1942	Shut My Big Mouth	Don Carlos Montoya	Charles Barton	
1942	Saboteur	Circus Troupe	Alfred Hitchcock	
1942	The Falcon Takes Over		Irving Reis	
1943	Tarzan Triumphs	Patriarch	Wilhelm Thiele	
1943	White Savage	Candlemaker	Arthur Lubin	
1943	Background to Danger	Old Turk	Raoul Walsh	uncredited
1943	For Whom the Bell Tolls	Colonel Miranda	Sam Wood	
1943	The Song of Bernadette	Dr. LeCramps	Henry King	
1944	Uncertain Glory	Executioner	Raoul Walsh	uncredited
1944	Once Upon a Time	Lepidopterist	Alexander Hall	uncredited
1944	The Falcon in Mexico	Don Carlos Ybarra	William Berke	
1944	Kismet	Meuzin	William Dieterle	uncredited
1944	The Keys of the Kingdom	Father Gomez	John M. Stahl	scenes deleted
1944	Tahiti Nights	Tonga	Will Jason	uncredited
1945	The Picture of Dorian Gray	Blue Gate Fields Pianist	Albert Lewin	uncredited
1945	In Old New Mexico	Father Angelo	Phil Rosen	
1945	Club Havana	Charles	Edgar G. Ulmer	
1945	They Were Expendable	Priest	John Ford	scenes deleted
1945	San Antonio	Ricardo Torreon	David Butler	
1945	Adventure	Felipe	Victor Fleming	
1946	Night in Paradise	Magus	Arthur Lubin	uncredited
1946	Cuban Pete	Perez	Jean Yarbrough	
1946	A Scandal in Paris	Priest	Douglas Sirk	
1946	Swamp Fire	Tim Rousseau	William H. Pine	
1946	Two Years Before the Mast	Don Sebastian	John Farrow	uncredited
1946	The Beast with Five Fingers	Horatio	Robert Florey	
1947	Carnival in Costa Rica	Papa Castro	Gregory Ratoff	
1947	Robin Hood of Monterey	Don Carlos Belmonte	Christy Cabanne	
1947	Green Dolphin Street	Priest	Victor Saville	uncredited
1948	The Time of Your Life	Arab Philosopher	H. C. Potter	
1948	Mexican Hayride	Señor Martinez	Charles Barton	
1948	Adventures of Don Juan	Pachecho	Vincent Sherman	uncredited
1949	Daughter of the West	Chief Wykomas	Harold Daniels	
1949	Omoo-Omoo, the Shark God	Chief Tari	Leon Leonard	
1949	The Daring Caballero	Padre Leonardo	Wallace Fox	
1949	Joe Palooka in the Counterpunch	Museum Caretaker	Reginald LeBorg	uncredited
1949	Samson and Delilah	Bar Simon	Cecil B. DeMille	
1950	Comanche Territory	Quisima	George Sherman	
1950	The Lawless	Mr. Garcia	Joseph Losey	
1950	Crisis	Father Del Puento	Richard Brooks	uncredited
1951	Oh! Susanna	Pactola	Joseph Kane	uncredited
1951	Cuban Fireball	Don Perez	William Beaudine	
1951	When the Redskins Rode	Chief Shingiss	Lew Landers	

=== Radio ===
Year	Program	Episode/source
1937	Lux Radio Theatre	Madame Butterfly
1946	Hollywood Star Time	The Song of Bernadette
