= Frank Readick =

American radio and film actor

- Born: Frank Marvin Readick Jr. November 6, 1896; Seattle, Washington, U.S.
- Died: December 27, 1965 (aged 69); U.S.
- Occupation: Actor
- Children: Robert Readick

Frank Marvin Readick Jr. (November 6, 1896 — December 27, 1965) was an American radio and film actor. He is best remembered for his portrayal of The Shadow.

== Life and career ==
Born in Seattle, Washington, Readick portrayed Mr. Purdy in Augustus Thomas's Nemesis at the Garrick Theatre in Philadelphia and on Broadway at the Hudson Theatre in 1921. He was well known for his evil laughter that followed the introduction from The Shadow radio drama: "Who knows what evil lurks in the hearts of men? The Shadow knows!". He replaced James La Curto to be the narrator in the Detective Story Hour (the precursor of The Shadow) in 1930, four months after the launch of the series when La Curto went for a Broadway role. Readick continued to portray the Shadow on The Blue Coal Radio Revue (1931-1932) and The Love Story Hour (1931-1932) before The Shadow was used as the title of a series. This signature line remained intact in The Shadow even after Orson Welles succeeded Readick.

He later played the doomed CBS reporter Carl Phillips in the 1938 radio production of The War of the Worlds. Readick modeled his performance on WLS reporter Herbert Morrison's coverage of the Hindenburg disaster the previous year.

Readick starred in an episode of Cavalcade of America titled Thomas Paine on April 30, 1940. He later appeared in Journey into Fear (1943).

On old-time radio, Readick was a member of the casts of The FBI in Peace and War and The Campbell Playhouse. He had the title roles in The Adventures of Smilin' Jack and Meet Mr. Meek, and portrayed Knobby Walsh on Joe Palooka. He was also known for House of Mystery (1931) and A Burglar to the Rescue (1931).

Readick died in 1965 in the USA.

== Filmography ==
=== Film ===
Year	Title	Role	Director	Notes	Ref.
1931	A Burglar to the Rescue	The Shadow	George Cochrane	Short film Voice role	
1931	Trapped	The Shadow	Kurt Neumann	Short film Voice role	
1931	Sealed Lips	The Shadow	Kurt Neumann	Short film Voice role	
1931	House of Mystery	The Shadow	Kurt Neumann	Short film Voice role	
1931	The Red Shadow	The Shadow	Kurt Neumann	Short film Voice role	
1931	The Circus Show-Up	The Shadow	Lewis Seiler	Short film Voice role	
1943	Journey into Fear	Matthews	Norman Foster	Spy film noir Based on the 1940 British novel of the same name by Eric Ambler	

=== Television ===
Year	Title	Role	Notes	Ref.
1938	The Mercury Theatre on the Air	Ernest Defarge	Episode: "A Tale of Two Cities"; Voice role	
