= All-Star Feature Corporation =

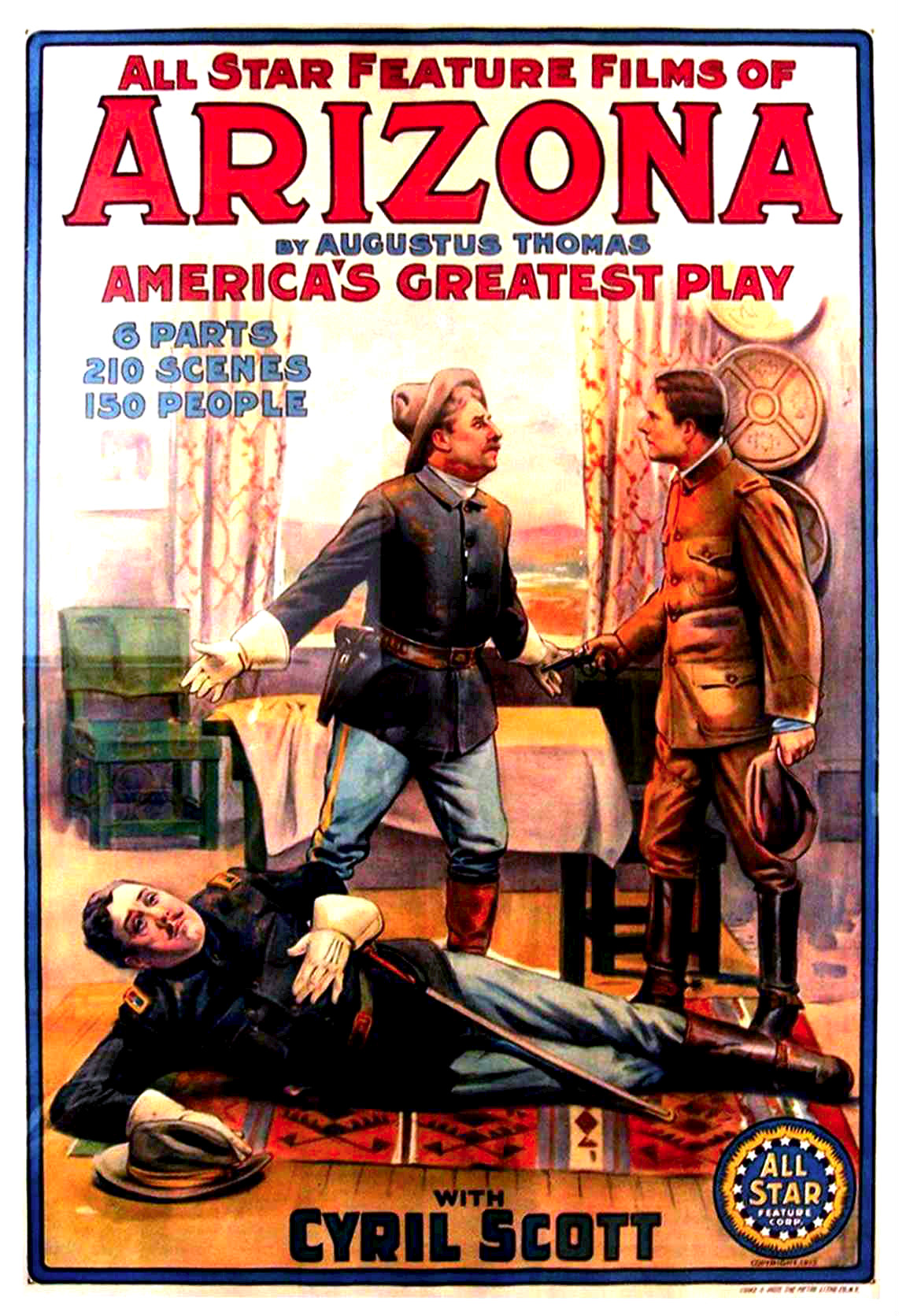

All-Star Feature Corporation was a film production company in the United States from 1913 until 1915 when it went bankrupt. It operated in New York. Various film stars debuted in the company's productions. It adapted plays into films. Adaptations of playwright Augustus Thomas plays were carried out. Archibald Selwyn and Philip Klein worked at the company.

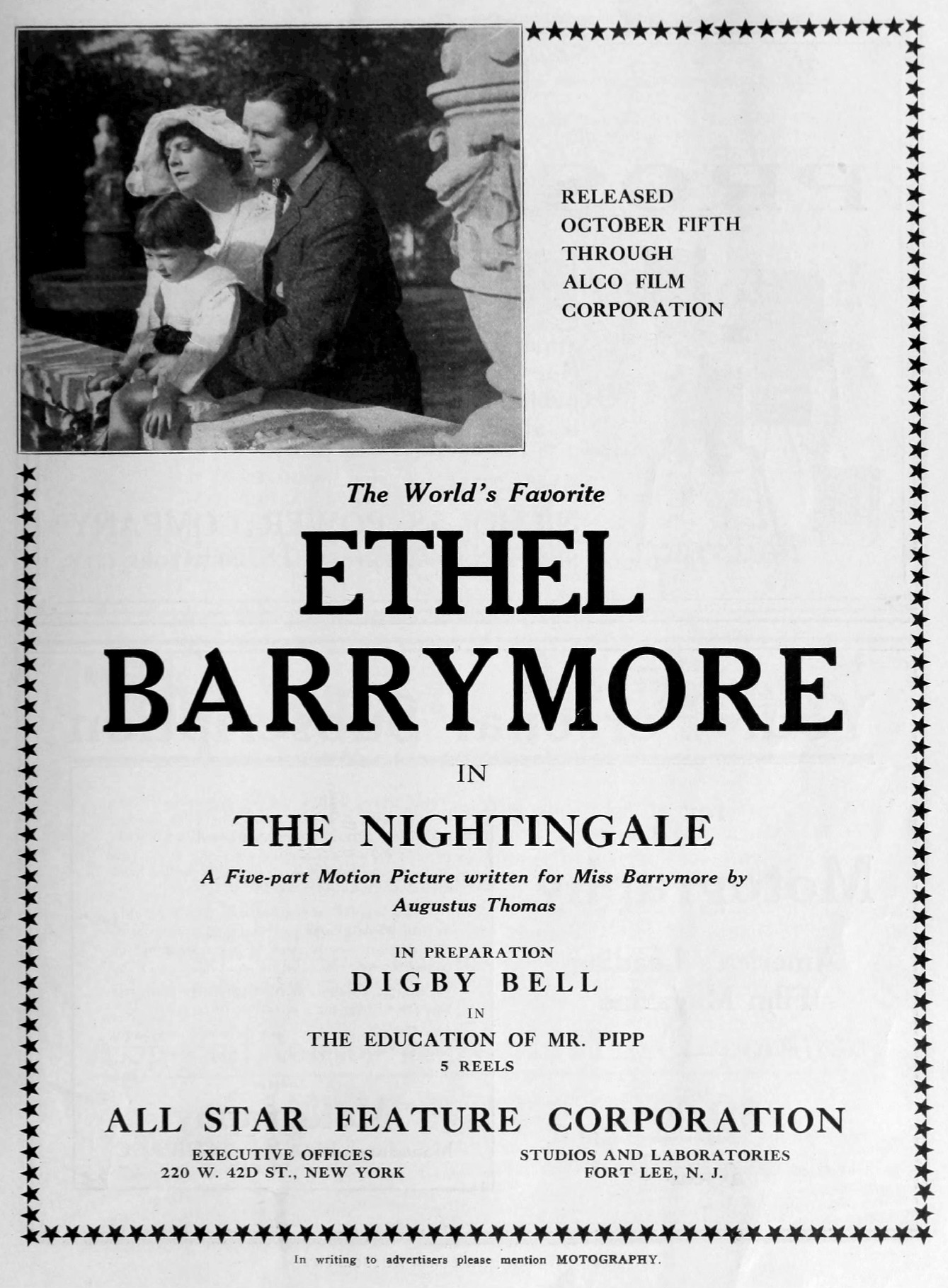

Harry Raver was its president. Manuel Klein worked on music for the company's films.

William F. Haddock directed films for the company.

== Filmography ==
- Arizona (1913) by Augustus Thomas
- Checkers (1913)
- The Jungle (1914) adapted from Upton Sinclair

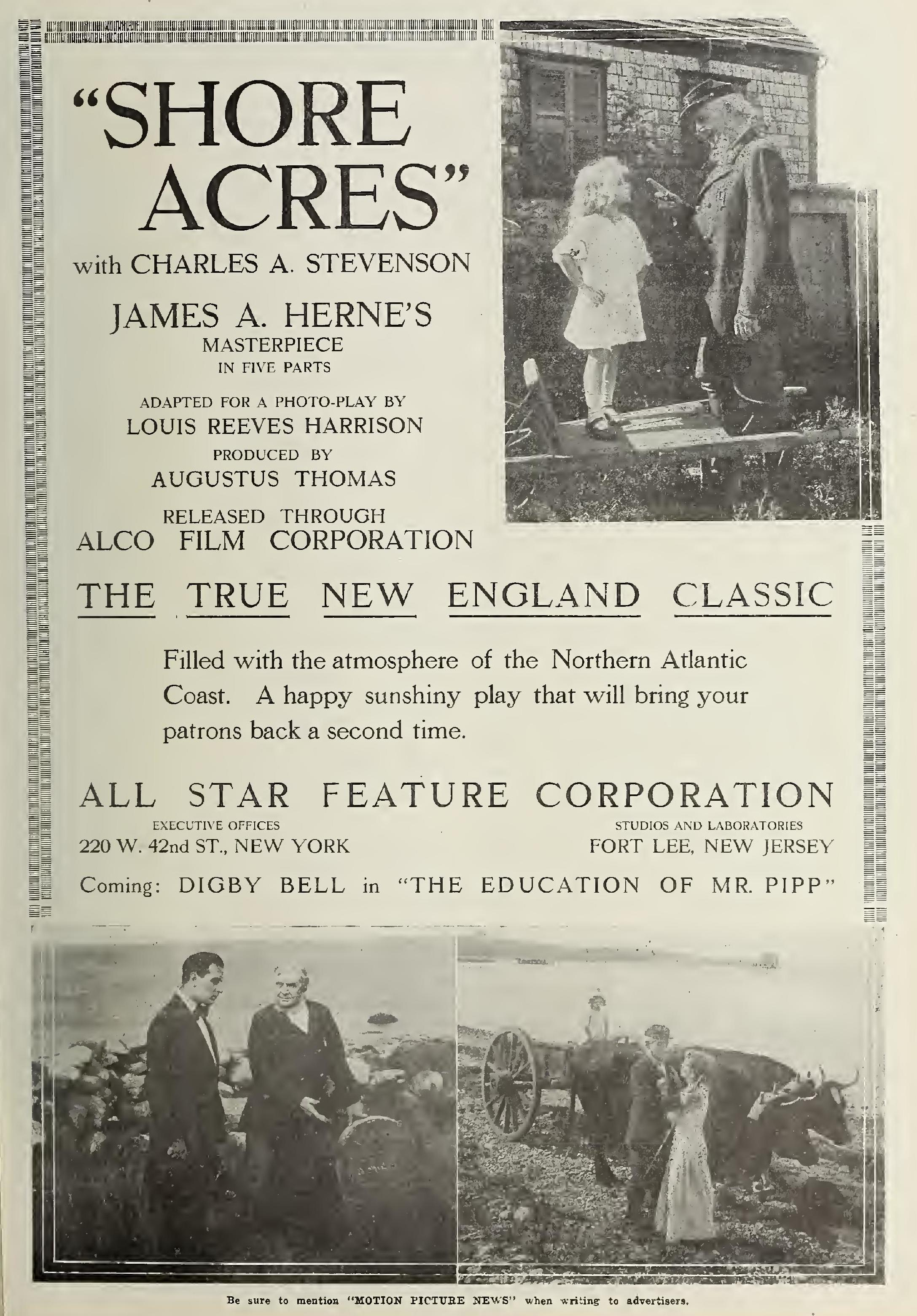

- Dan (1914) by Hal Reid
- Shore Acres (1914) adapted from James A. Herne
- Paid in Full (1914) adapted from Eugene Walter
- The Nightingale (1914) starring Ethel Barrymore
- The Education of Mr. Pipp (1914)
- In Mizzoura by Augustus Thomas
- Soldiers of Fortune (1914)
- Pierre of the Plains (1914) written by Edgar Selwyn
- The Garden of Lies (1915)
