= Crime and Punishment (1917 film) =

1917 American silent film by Lawrence B. McGill

- Directed by: Lawrence B. McGill
- Written by: Charles A. Taylor
- Based on: Crime and Punishment; 1866 novel by Fyodor Dostoevsky
- Starring: Derwent Hall Caine; Cherrie Coleman; Lydia Knott
- Cinematography: Henry Cronjager
- Production company: Arrow Film Corporation
- Distributed by: Pathé Exchange
- Release date: February 25, 1917
- Running time: 5 reels
- Country: United States
- Languages: Silent; English intertitles

Crime and Punishment is a 1917 American silent crime drama film directed by Lawrence B. McGill and starring Derwent Hall Caine, Cherrie Coleman and Lydia Knott. Based on Fyodor Dostoevsky's 1866 novel of the same title, it shifts the setting to portray the protagonist as a Russian immigrant in America.

== Cast ==
- Derwent Hall Caine as Rodion Raskolnikoff
- Cherrie Coleman as Dounia, His Sister
- Lydia Knott as His Mother
- Carl Gerard as Razmouhin Porkovitch
- Sidney Bracey as Andreas Valeskoff
- Marguerite Courtot as Sonia Marmeladoff
- Robert Cummings as Porphyus

== Bibliography ==
- Ken Wlaschin. Silent Mystery and Detective Movies: A Comprehensive Filmography. McFarland, 2009.
