= The Hero of Submarine D-2 =

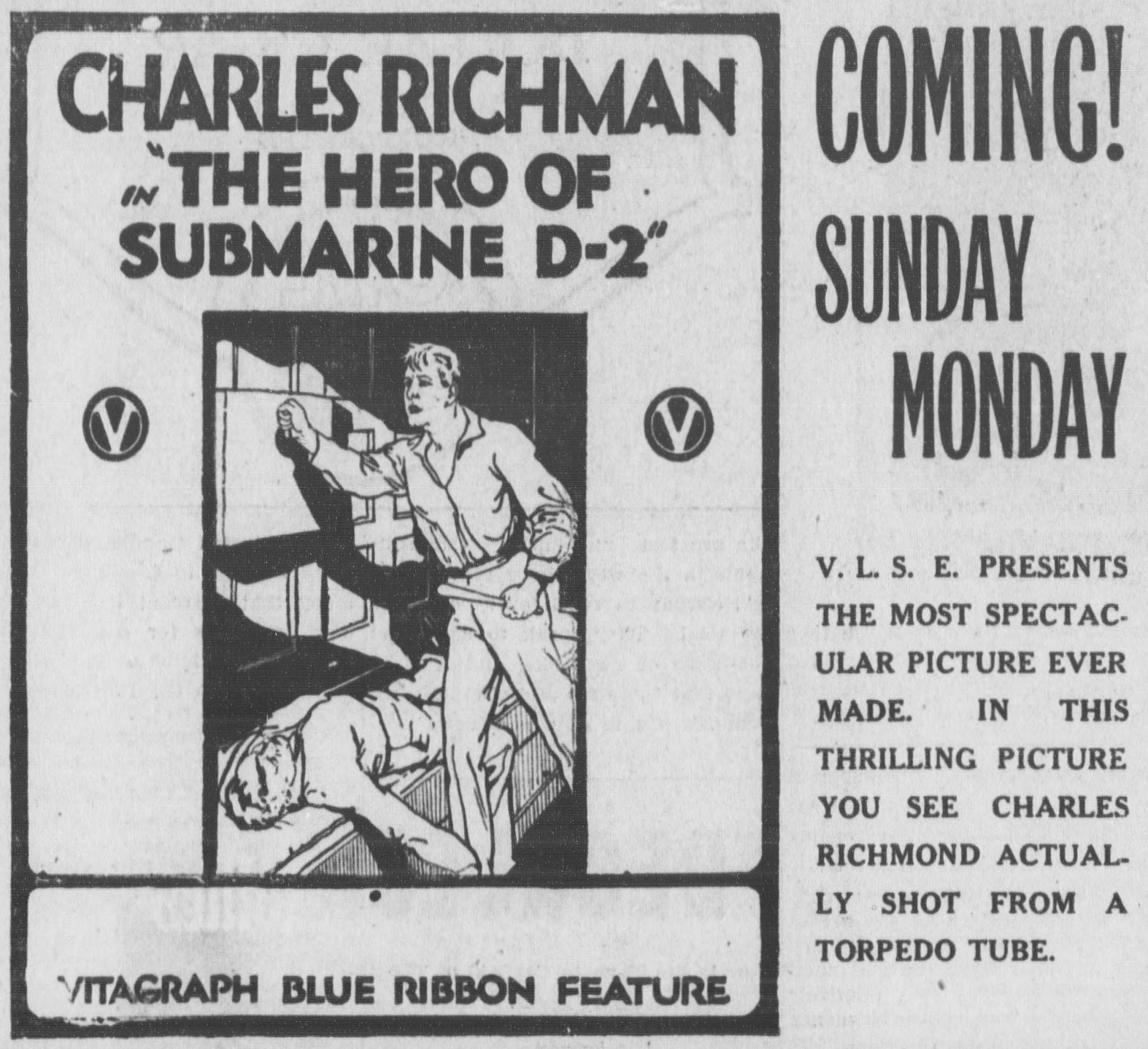
- Contemporary newspaper advertisement
- Directed by: Paul Scardon
- Written by: Jasper Ewing Brady Jasper Ewing Brady
- Based on: short story Colton, U.S.N. by Cyrus Townsend Brady
- Produced by: Vitagraph Company of America
- Starring: Charles Richman
- Distributed by: V-L-S-E
- Release date: March 13, 1916
- Running time: 5 reels
- Country: USA
- Language: Silent

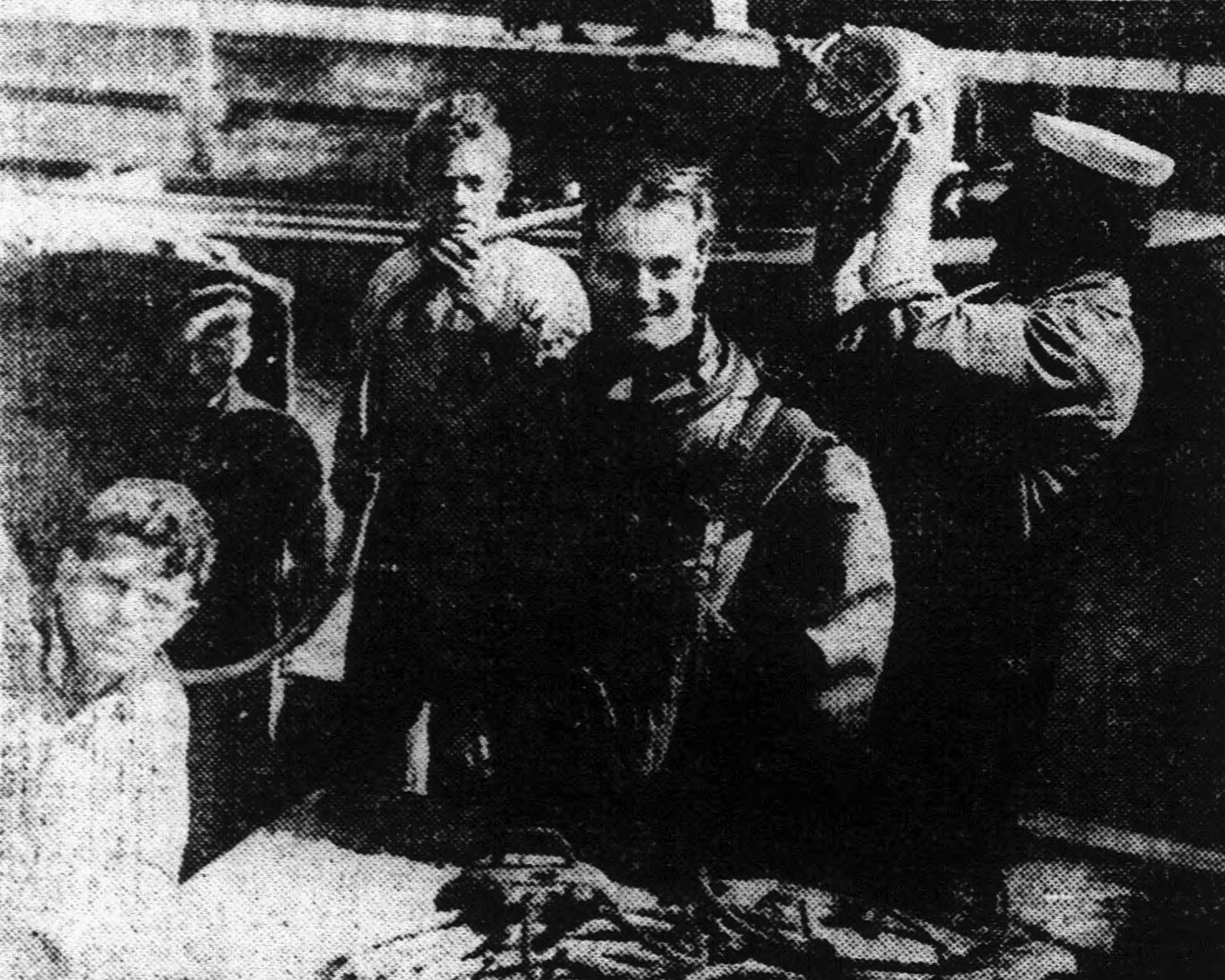
Scene from the film.

The Hero of Submarine D-2 is a lost 1916 silent adventure war film directed by Paul Scardon and starring Charles Richman. It was produced by the Vitagraph Company of America and released by V-L-S-E Incorporated.

== Cast ==
- Charles Richman – Lt. Commander Colton
- James W. Morrison – Gilman Austen
- Anders Randolf – J.F. Austin (*as Anders Randolph)
- Charles Wellesley – Captain McMasters
- Thomas R. Mills – James Archer (*as Thomas Mills)
- L. Rogers Lytton – The Ruanian ambassador
- Eleanor Woodruff – Caroline Autsten
- Zena Keefe – Ethel McMasters

uncredited

- Commander R. K. Crank
- Captain Louis M. Milton
- Lieutenant Roger K. Welles
- Lieutenant Commander Franck Taylor Evans
