= The Brand of Cowardice =

1916 film by John W. Noble

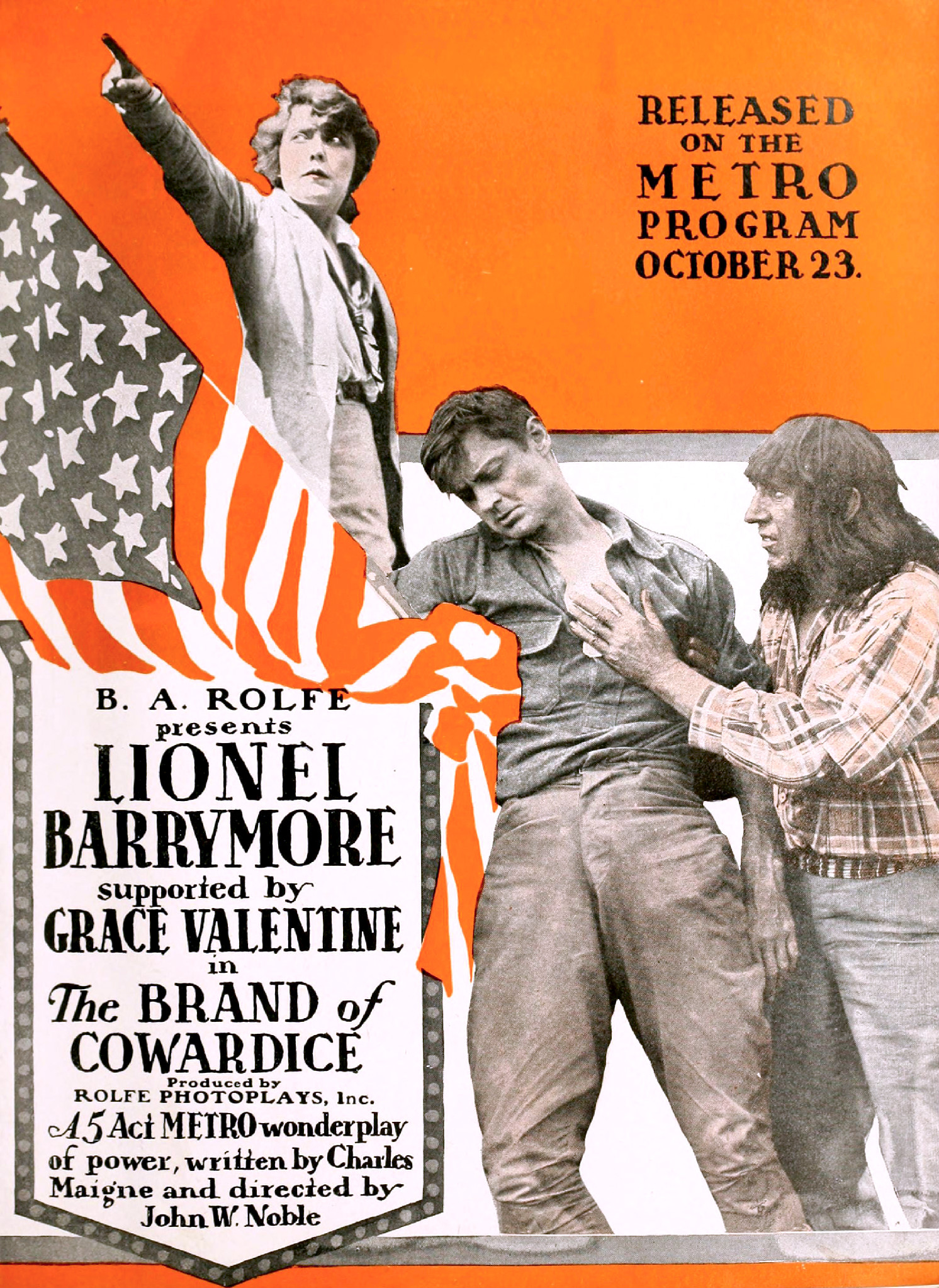
- Advertisement
- Directed by: John W. Noble
- Written by: Charles Maigne(story & scenario)
- Produced by: B. A. Rolfe(Rolfe Photoplays, Inc)
- Starring: Lionel Barrymore; Grace Valentine
- Cinematography: H.O. Carleton
- Distributed by: Metro Pictures
- Release date: October 23, 1916
- Running time: 5 reels
- Country: United States
- Language: Silent film (English intertitles)

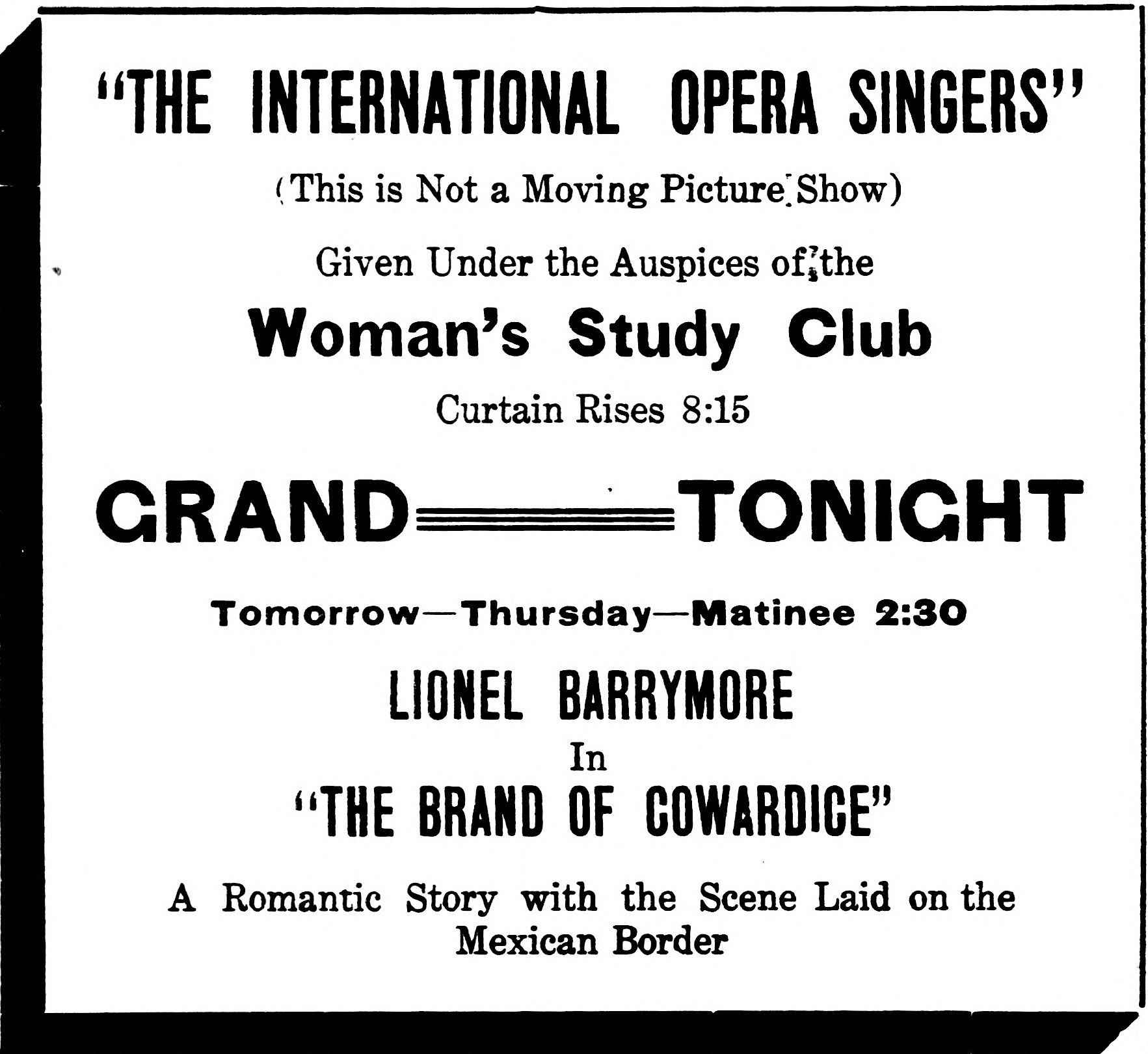
a contemporary newspaper advertisement

The Brand of Cowardice is a 1916 silent film starring Lionel Barrymore and released through Metro Pictures. It is a lost film.

== Plot ==
After Cyril Hamilton refuses to follow his father-in-law Colonel Gordon West's National Guard unit into action in the Mexican Border War, his fiancé Marcia West breaks up with him. He ashamedly enlists in another regiment and goes west but alienates all of his fellow soldiers with his pompous behavior. However, he finally redeems himself by rescuing Marcia from the bandit Navarete. Although they are overwhelmed by Navarete's forces after killing him, they are rescued by Colonel West's forces and marry.

== Cast ==
- Lionel Barrymore as Cyril Hamilton
- Grace Valentine as Marcia West
- Robert Cummings as Colonel Gordon West
- Kate Blancke as Mrs. West
- John Davidson as Navarete
- Frank Montgomery as Idiqui
- Louis Wolheim as Corporal Mallin
- Tula Belle as Ran, Isiqui's daughter

== Production ==
The film was shot in Huntington and Tarrytown, New York. Battle scenes were shot in New Hampton using local convicts as extras.

== See also ==
- Lionel Barrymore filmography
