= The Jungle (1914 film) =

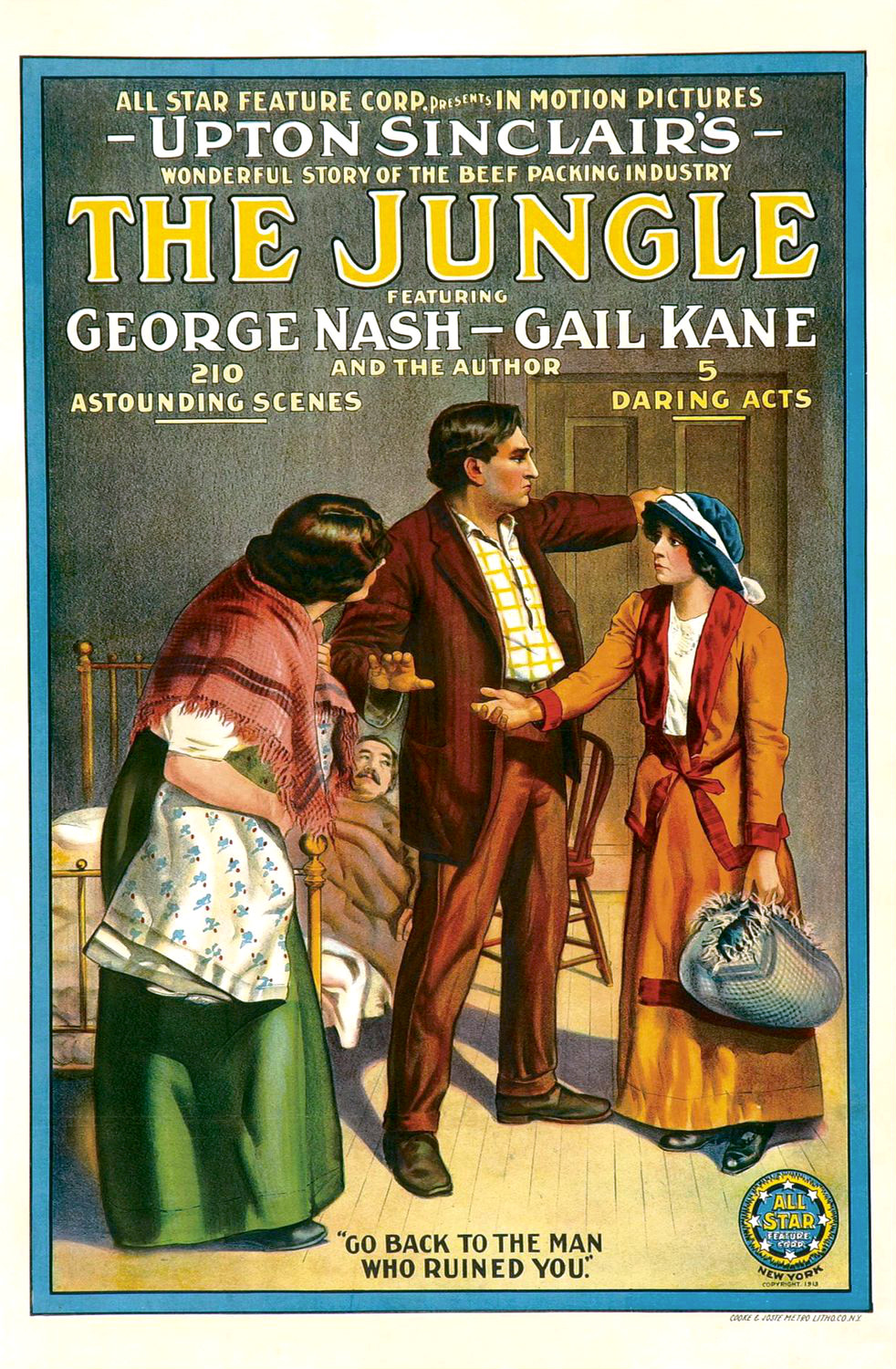
- Directed by: Augustus Thomas; George Irving; John H. Pratt
- Written by: Benjamin S Cutler; Margaret Mayo; Upton Sinclair (novel)
- Starring: George Nash; Gail Kane
- Distributed by: All-Star Feature Corporation
- Release date: 1914
- Running time: 5 reels
- Country: United States
- Languages: Silent; English (intertitles)

The Jungle (1914) is an American drama silent film made by the All-Star Feature Corporation starring George Nash. The film is an adaptation of the 1906 book of the same name by Upton Sinclair, the only one to date. Sinclair reportedly bought the negative of the film prior to 1916, hoping to market the film nationally after its initial release in 1914. Sinclair himself reportedly appears at the beginning and end of the movie, as a sort of endorsement of the film.

The film, from historical accounts at the time of release, included the scene of Jurgis murdering the foreman who raped Jurgis's wife by throwing him over a walkway into a "sea of frightful horns passing beneath him" (cattle). The film was commonly screened at socialist meetings across America at the time.

It is now considered a lost film.

== Plot ==
The plot is based around the Chicago stockyards where a Lithuanian immigrant, Jurgis Rudkus gains a job. Once working at the stockyards he meets and marries the character Ona, but due to cut backs at the stockyards loses his job and they fall into financial hardship. Ona, in order to get money to feed their child, engages in sexual activity with her husband's foreman, Connor. When Rudkus finds out about the affair he throws Connor into a cattle pen where he is killed. While in prison Ona dies. When Rudkus gets out of prison he becomes an advocate for woman via the Socialist Party.

== Cast ==
- George Nash as Jurgis Rudkus
- Gail Kane as Ona
- Julia Hurley as Elzbieta
- Robert Cummings as Connor
- Alice Marc as Marija
- Robert Paton Gibbs as Antanas (credited as Robert Payton Gibbs)
- Clarence Handyside as John Durham
- E. P. Evers as Freddy Durham (credited as Ernest Evers)
- George Henry Irving
- Upton Sinclair as Himself

== See also ==
- List of American films of 1914
- List of lost films
