= Nemesis (Thomas play) =

Nemesis is a play in four acts by Augustus Thomas. It premiered at the Garrick Theatre in Philadelphia on March 21, 1921. It transferred to Broadway where it opened at the Hudson Theatre on April 4, 1921. Produced by George M. Cohan and directed by John Meehan, it ran for 56 performances; closing in May 1921. Built around a love triangle, the show starred Olive Tell as the heroine Marcia Kallan, Pedro De Cordoba as Marcia's lover, the sculptor Mr. Jovaine, and Emmett Corrigan as Marcia's jealous husband, the silk merchant John Kallan. Some of the other cast members included Eleanor Woodruff as Grace Lonarby, Roland Bottomley as Dr. Simpson, John Craig as Mr. Davis, Robert Cummings as Officer Conlon, Jennie Dickerson as Jeanne, Frank Readick as Mr. Purdy, Ethel Winthrop as Mrs. Purdy, and G. Clayton Frye as the Judge.

== Plot ==
Setting: New York City

John Kallan in enraged over his wife Marcia's infidelity with the young artist, Mr. Jovaine. He plots revenge, and murder's Marcia while carefully planting manufactured evidence that implicates Jovaine as the killer. A court trial ensues and Jovaine is convicted of the crime. He is sentenced to death and is executed. John Kallan stands outside the gates of Sing Sing at the time of the execution, and delivers a monologue on the infallibility on circumstantial evidence.
