= Betsy Ross (film) =

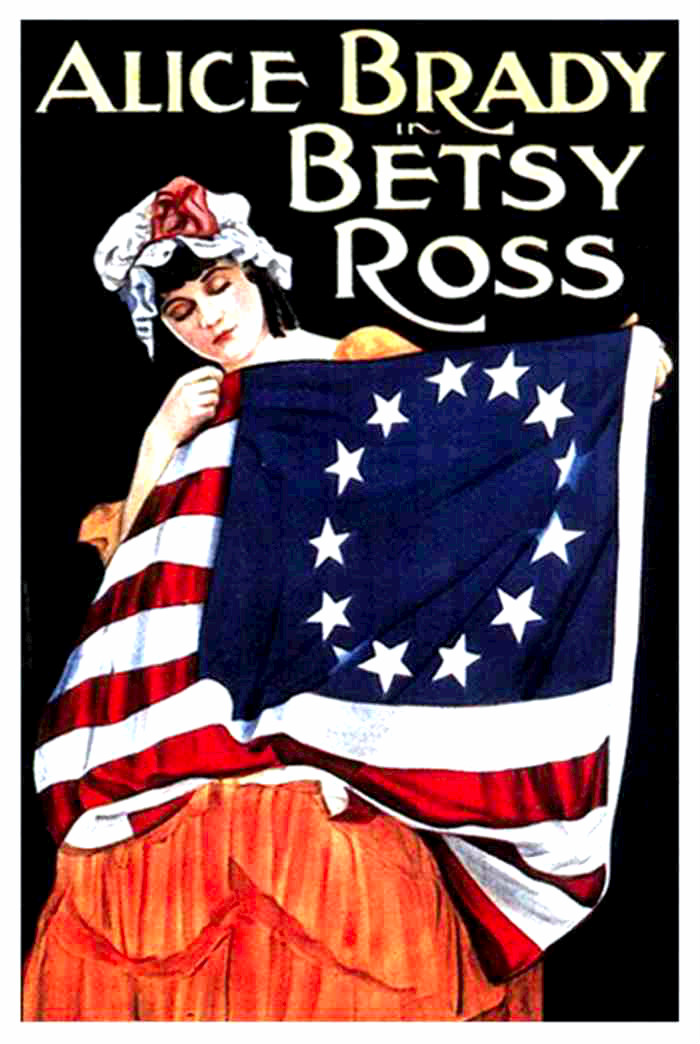
- Film poster
- Directed by: Travers Vale; George Cowl
- Written by: Henry A. Du Souchet
- Produced by: William A. Brady (of World Film)
- Starring: Alice Brady
- Cinematography: Max Schneider; Arthur L. Todd
- Distributed by: World Film Company
- Release date: September 17, 1917
- Running time: 60 minutes (5 reels)
- Country: United States
- Language: Silent (English intertitles)

Betsy Ross is a surviving 1917 American silent historical film starring Alice Brady and produced and distributed by her father William A. Brady.

== Plot ==
Betsy Ross (full film)

As described in a film magazine, Betsy Griscom (Brady), against the wishes of her Quaker parents, keeps a tryst with a British officer, Clarence Vernon (Mayo), who promises to marry her upon his return. Clarissa (Cook), her sister, falls in love and marries Joseph Ashburn (Bowers), a trader. Suspecting Vernon of duplicity, Joseph and Vernon fight a duel and Vernon is struck down. A year later Betsy marries John Ross (Kennard), and upon his death she operates a little shop for a living. Here she shields her sister, who was driven from home when she could not produce her marriage certificate. Betsy is commissioned by General Washington (MacQuarrie) to make the first American flag and later is accused of harboring a spy - in reality, her sister's husband. The film ends happily when all relations are explained.

== Cast ==
- Alice Brady as Betsy Ross
- John Bowers as Joseph Ashburn
- Lillian Cook as Clarissa Griscom
- Victor Kennard as John Ross
- Eugenie Woodward as Mrs. Ashburn
- Kate Lester as Mrs. Vernon
- Frank Mayo as Clarence Vernon
- George MacQuarrie as George Washington
- Justine Cutting as Mrs. Griscom
- Robert Forsyth as Samuel Griscom
- Nellie Fillmore as Mrs. Bass
- Richard Clarke as Lemuel Ketch
- Robert Cummings as Joel Radley

== Reception ==
Like many American films of the time, Betsy Ross was subject to cuts by city and state film censorship boards. The Chicago Board of Censors required cuts of scenes of a sword thrust during the duel, killing of second man in duel, the two intertitles "Scarlet woman" and "Don't you dare kill the Vernon nigger," the scene with a duel vision, and the actual firing of the squad at the execution.

== See also ==
- List of films about the American Revolution
