= George Cowl =

British actor

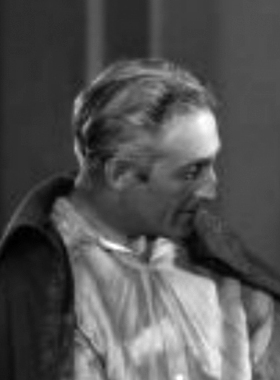
- Cowl in The Adventurer
- Born: 24 February 1878; Blackpool, Lancashire, United Kingdom
- Died: 4 April 1942 (aged 64); Los Angeles, California, United States
- Occupation: Actor
- Years active: 1914–1942 (film)

George Cowl (1878–1942) was a British film actor active in the United States. He also directed four films during the silent era.

== Selected filmography ==
- Dan (1914)
- When Broadway Was a Trail (1914)
- The Rack (1916)
- The Closed Road (1916)
- The Beloved Adventuress (1917)
- Her Hour (1917)
- The Stolen Paradise (1917)
- The Crimson Dove (1917)
- Youth (1917)
- Betsy Ross (1917)
- The Corner Grocer (1917)
- The Iron Ring (1917)
- The Mystery of the Yellow Room (1919)
- Love, Honor and Obey (1920)
- The Shadow of Rosalie Byrnes (1920)
- The Plaything of Broadway (1921)
- Whispering Shadows (1921)
- The Glory of Clementina (1922)
- Pink Gods (1922)
- Fashionable Fakers (1923)
- The Prisoner (1923)
- Secrets (1924)
- The Jade Cup (1926)
- Marriage License? (1926)
- Broadway Madness (1927)
- Court Martial (1928)
- The Adventurer (1928)
- The Jazz Cinderella (1930)
- Secrets of Hollywood (1933)
- Riptide (1934)
- What Every Woman Knows (1934)
- Step Lively, Jeeves! (1937)
- Conquest (1937)
- Easy Living (1937)
- The Glass Key (1942)

== Bibliography ==
- Goble, Alan. The Complete Index to Literary Sources in Film. Walter de Gruyter, 1999.
- Solomon, Aubrey. The Fox Film Corporation, 1915–1935: A History and Filmography. McFarland, 2011.
