= The Adventurer (1928 film) =

1928 film directed by Viktor Tourjansky

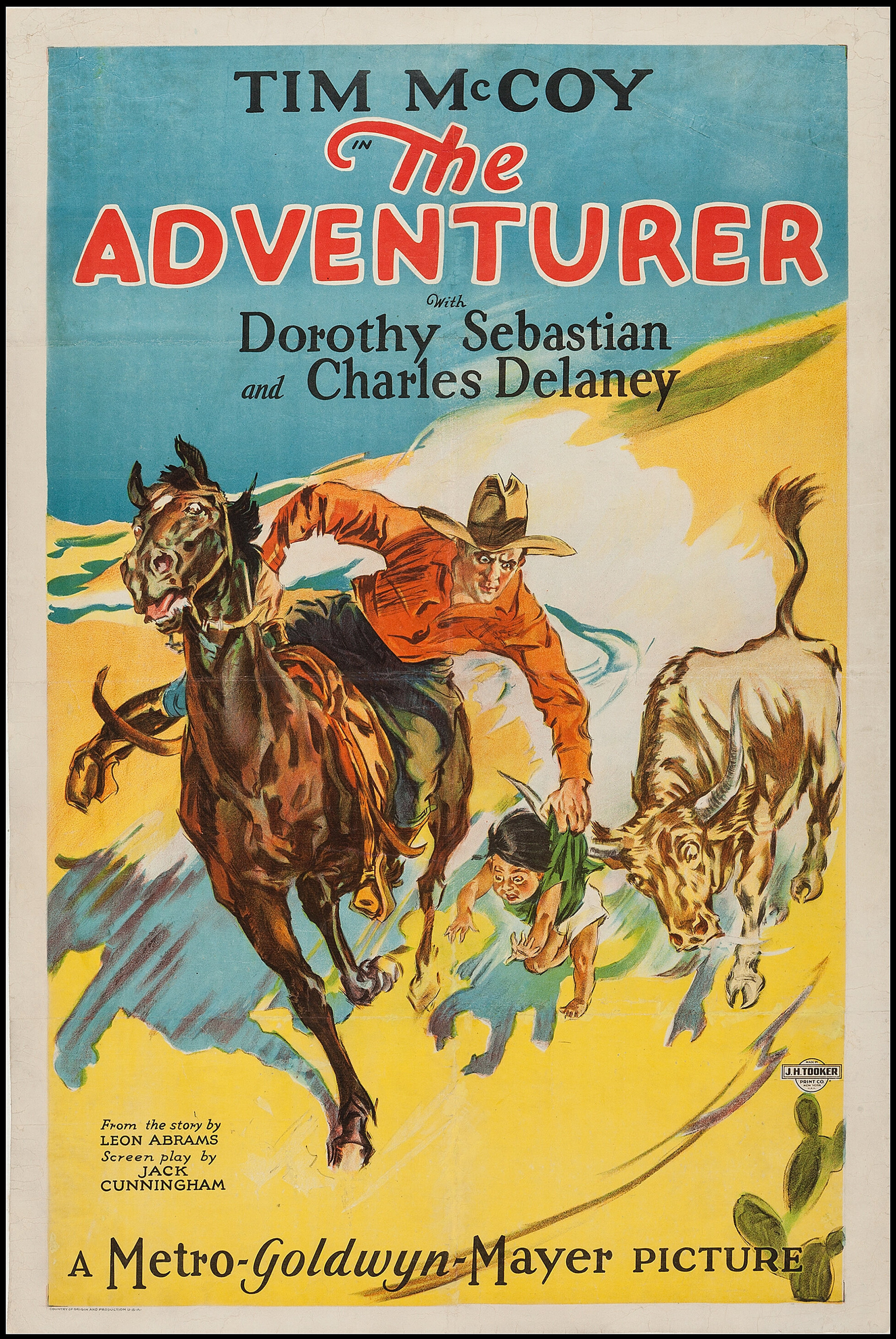
- Theatrical release poster
- Directed by: Viktor Tourjansky; W.S. Van Dyke
- Screenplay by: Ruth Cummings; Jack Cunningham
- Story by: Leon Abrams
- Produced by: Irving Thalberg
- Starring: Tim McCoy; Dorothy Sebastian; Charles Delaney; George Cowl; Michael Visaroff
- Cinematography: Clyde De Vinna
- Edited by: Sam Zimbalist
- Production company: Metro-Goldwyn-Mayer
- Distributed by: Metro-Goldwyn-Mayer
- Release date: July 14, 1928
- Running time: 50 minutes
- Country: United States
- Language: Silent (English intertitles)

The Adventurer is a lost 1928 American silent adventure film directed by Viktor Tourjansky and an uncredited W.S. Van Dyke with a screenplay written by Ruth Cummings and Jack Cunningham. The film stars Tim McCoy, Dorothy Sebastian, Charles Delaney, George Cowl and Michael Visaroff. The film was released on July 14, 1928, by Metro-Goldwyn-Mayer.

== Plot ==
Mining engineer Jim McClellan is in love with Dolores de Silva, the daughter of the deposed president of a South American country. McClellan tries to help de Silva regain power but finds himself involved in a series of dangerous adventures that even lead him to a firing squad. Eventually, the revolutionaries are defeated and the president returns to the government while McClellan finally wins the girl he loves.

== Cast ==
- Tim McCoy as Jim McClellan
- Dorothy Sebastian as Dolores de Silva
- Charles Delaney as Barney O'Malley
- George Cowl as Esteban de Silva
- Michael Visaroff as Somaroff
- Gayne Whitman as The Tornado
- Alex Melesh as John Milton Gibbs
- Katherine Block as Duenna

== Preservation ==
With no holdings located in archives, The Adventurer is considered a lost film.
