= Evil laughter =

Manic laughter by a villain in fiction

An evil laugh, with echo effects applied

Evil laughter or maniacal laughter is a distinct laughter that is typically exhibited by villains in fiction. It is associated with the horror genre.

Evil laughter may be written as muah hahaha or bwahahaha. They are used by supervillains in comic books and video games, generally when some form of victory is attained, to indicate superiority over another, or to mock another character's earnestness.

Maniacal laughter may confirm a character's villainy, signaling gratification from performing acts of evil. Deliberately expressing delight in crisis situations is distinctly inappropriate and thus may cause viewers to see a character as an enemy.

== Notable examples ==
During the 1930s, the popular radio program The Shadow used a signature evil laugh as part of its presentation. This was a rare case of a non-villain character using an evil laugh, and it was voiced by actor Frank Readick. His laugh was used even after Orson Welles took over the lead role. Actor Vincent Price's evil laugh has been used or copied many times in radio, film, music, and television, notably at the end of the music video Michael Jackson's Thriller. Other examples of evil laughter in film include the alien in Predator, the stepmother in Cinderella, Majin Buu in Dragon Ball Z, and the Wicked Witch of the West in The Wizard of Oz.

In films, evil laughter often fills the soundtrack when the villain is off camera. In such cases, the laughter follows the hero or victim as they try to escape. An example of this is in Raiders of the Lost Ark, where Belloq's laugh fills the South American jungle as Indiana Jones escapes from the Hovitos.

Animals such as the barred owl and laughing gull make sounds that resemble evil laughter.

== See also ==
- Schadenfreude
