= Range War =

1939 film by Lesley Selander

- Theatrical release poster
- Directed by: Lesley Selander
- Screenplay by: Sam Robins; Walter C. Roberts
- Story by: Josef Montaigue
- Produced by: Harry Sherman
- Starring: William Boyd; Russell Hayden; Britt Wood; Pedro de Cordoba; Willard Robertson; Matt Moore; Betty Moran
- Cinematography: Russell Harlan
- Edited by: Sherman A. Rose
- Music by: Victor Young
- Production company: Paramount Pictures
- Distributed by: Paramount Pictures
- Release date: September 8, 1939
- Running time: 65 minutes
- Country: United States
- Language: English

Range War is a 1939 American Western film directed by Lesley Selander and written by Sam Robins and Walter C. Roberts. The film stars William Boyd, Russell Hayden, Britt Wood, Pedro de Cordoba, Willard Robertson, Matt Moore and Betty Moran. The film was released on September 8, 1939, by Paramount Pictures.

== Plot ==
Buck Colins heads a group of local ranchers who are trying to prevent the railroad from completing its line through their property. Till now they have been able to charge tolls on herds passing through. Hoppy goes undercover to expose them.

== Cast ==
- William Boyd as Hopalong Cassidy
- Russell Hayden as Lucky Jenkins
- Britt Wood as Speedy MacGinnis
- Pedro de Cordoba as Padre Jose
- Willard Robertson as Buck Collins
- Matt Moore as Jim Marlow
- Betty Moran as Ellen Marlow
- Kenneth Harlan as Charles Higgins
- Francis McDonald as Dave Morgan
- Eddie Dean as Henchman Pete
- Earle Hodgins as Deputy Sheriff
- Jason Robards, Sr. as Rancher
- Stanley Price as Agitator
- Ray Bennett as Henchman Stokey
