= Big Jim Garrity =

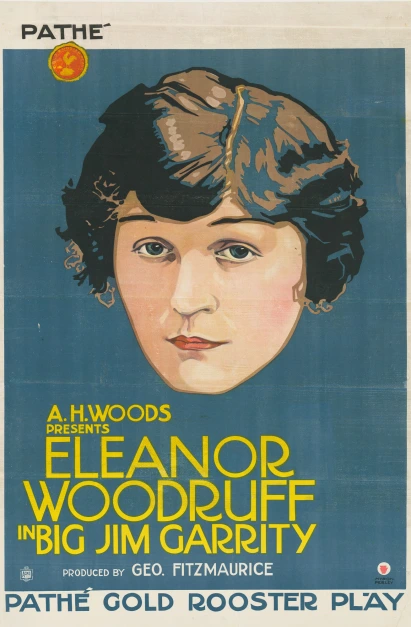
- lobby poster
- Directed by: George Fitzmaurice
- Written by: Ouida Bergère
- Based on: Big Jim Garrity (play) by Owen Davis
- Produced by: A. H. Woods
- Starring: Robert Edeson; Eleanor Woodruff; Carl Harbaugh
- Cinematography: Arthur C. Miller
- Production company: Pathé Exchange
- Distributed by: Pathé Exchange
- Release date: April 18, 1916
- Running time: 50 minutes
- Country: United States
- Languages: Silent; English intertitles

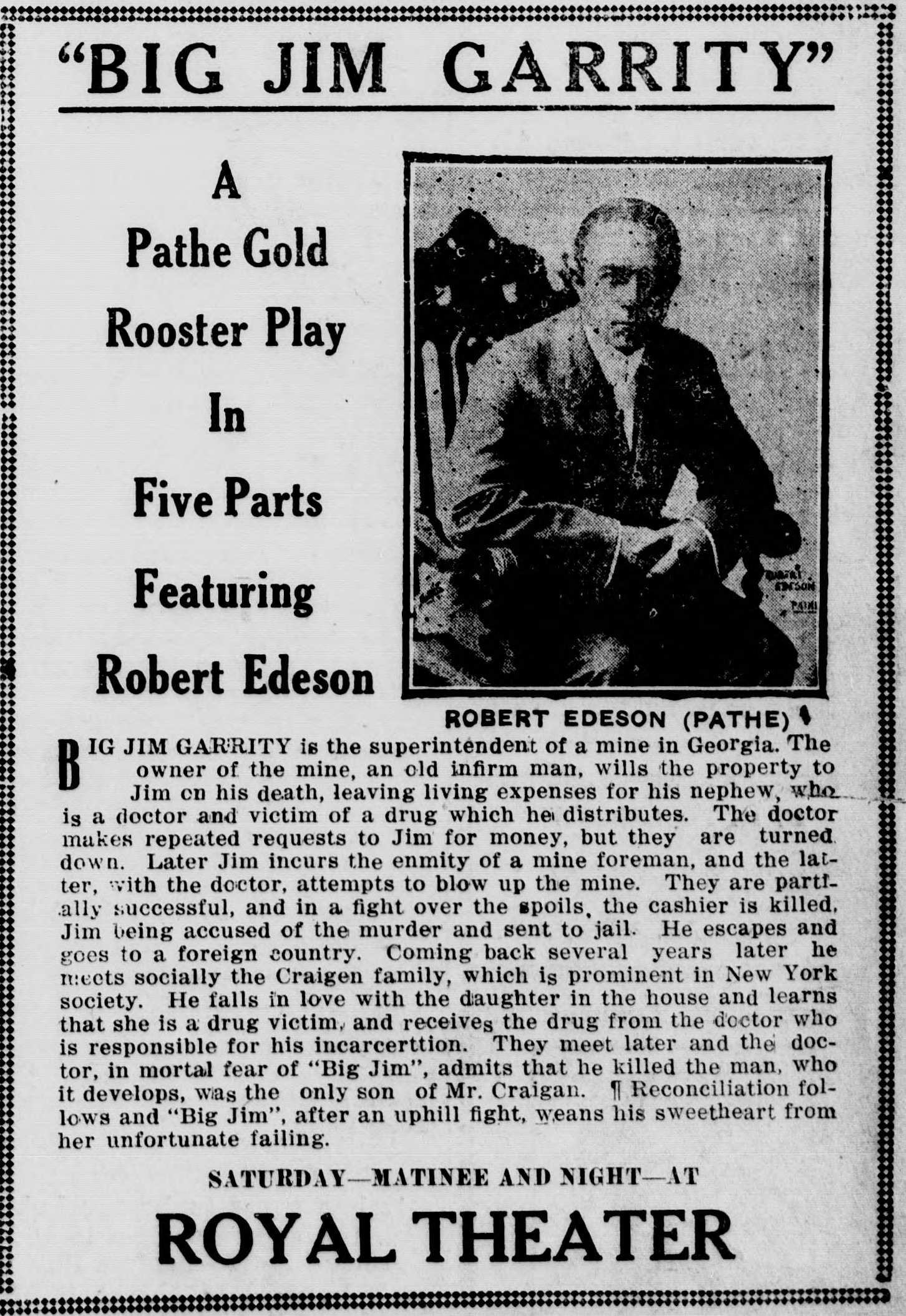
Newspaper advertisement.

Big Jim Garrity is a 1916 American silent drama film directed by George Fitzmaurice and starring Robert Edeson, Eleanor Woodruff and Carl Harbaugh. The film was based on a 1910 play of the same name by Owen Davis. Ouida Bergère adapted it for the screen. Location shooting for the film was done in Jersey City, New Jersey and Atlanta, Georgia.

== Cast ==
- Robert Edeson as Jim Garrity
- Eleanor Woodruff as Sylvia Craigen
- Carl Harbaugh as Dawson
- Lyster Chambers as Dr. Hugh Malone
- Charles Compton as Sam Craigen
- Carleton Macy as Mr. Craigen

== Preservation ==
A complete print of Big Jim Garrity is held by the Archives du Film du CNC in Bois d'Arcy.

In 2017, the film was restored by the Cinémathèque Française from a print in their own collection and the intertitles were sourced from a copy from The Swedish Film Institute.

== Bibliography ==
- James Robert Parish & Michael R. Pitts. Film directors: a guide to their American films. Scarecrow Press, 1974.
