= The Prisoner (1923 film) =

1923 film

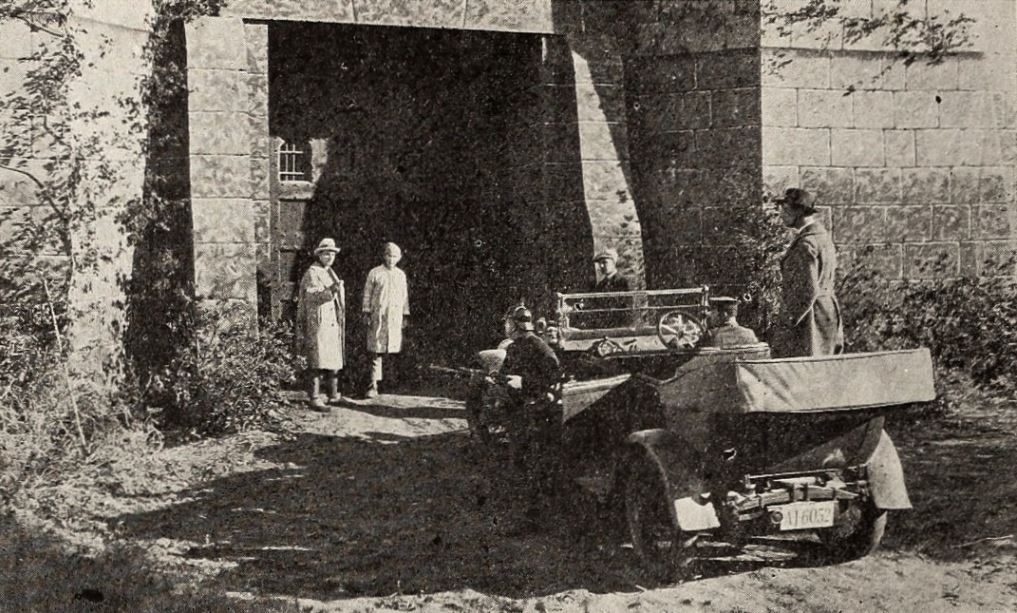
- Film still
- Directed by: Jack Conway
- Written by: Edward T. Lowe Jr. (screenplay)
- Based on: Castle Craneycrow by George Barr McCutcheon
- Produced by: Carl Laemmle
- Starring: Herbert Rawlinson; Eileen Percy
- Cinematography: Benjamin Reynolds
- Distributed by: Universal Pictures
- Release date: February 18, 1923 (Cleveland premiere)
- Running time: 5 reels (50 minutes)
- Country: United States
- Language: Silent (English intertitles)

The Prisoner is a 1923 American silent drama film set in a fictional kingdom, directed by Jack Conway and featuring Herbert Rawlinson, Eileen Percy, June Elvidge, George Cowl and Boris Karloff. Karloff was paid $150.00 a week salary for working on this film. The screenplay was written by Edward T. Lowe Jr., based on a novel called Castle Craneycrow by George Barr McCutcheon. The film is considered to be lost.

== Cast ==
- Herbert Rawlinson as Philip Quentin
- Eileen Percy as Dorothy Garrison
- George Cowl as Lord Bob
- June Elvidge as Lady Francis
- Lincoln Stedman as Dickey Savage
- Gertrude Short as Lady Jane
- Bertram Grassby as Prince Ugo Ravorelli
- Mario Carillo as Count Sallonica
- Hayford Hobbs as Duke Laselli
- Lillian Langdon as Mrs. Garrison
- Bert Sprotte as Courant
- Boris Karloff as Prince Kapolski
- Esther Ralston as Marie
- J. P. Lockney as Father Bivot

== See also ==
- Boris Karloff filmography
