= A Rich Man's Plaything =

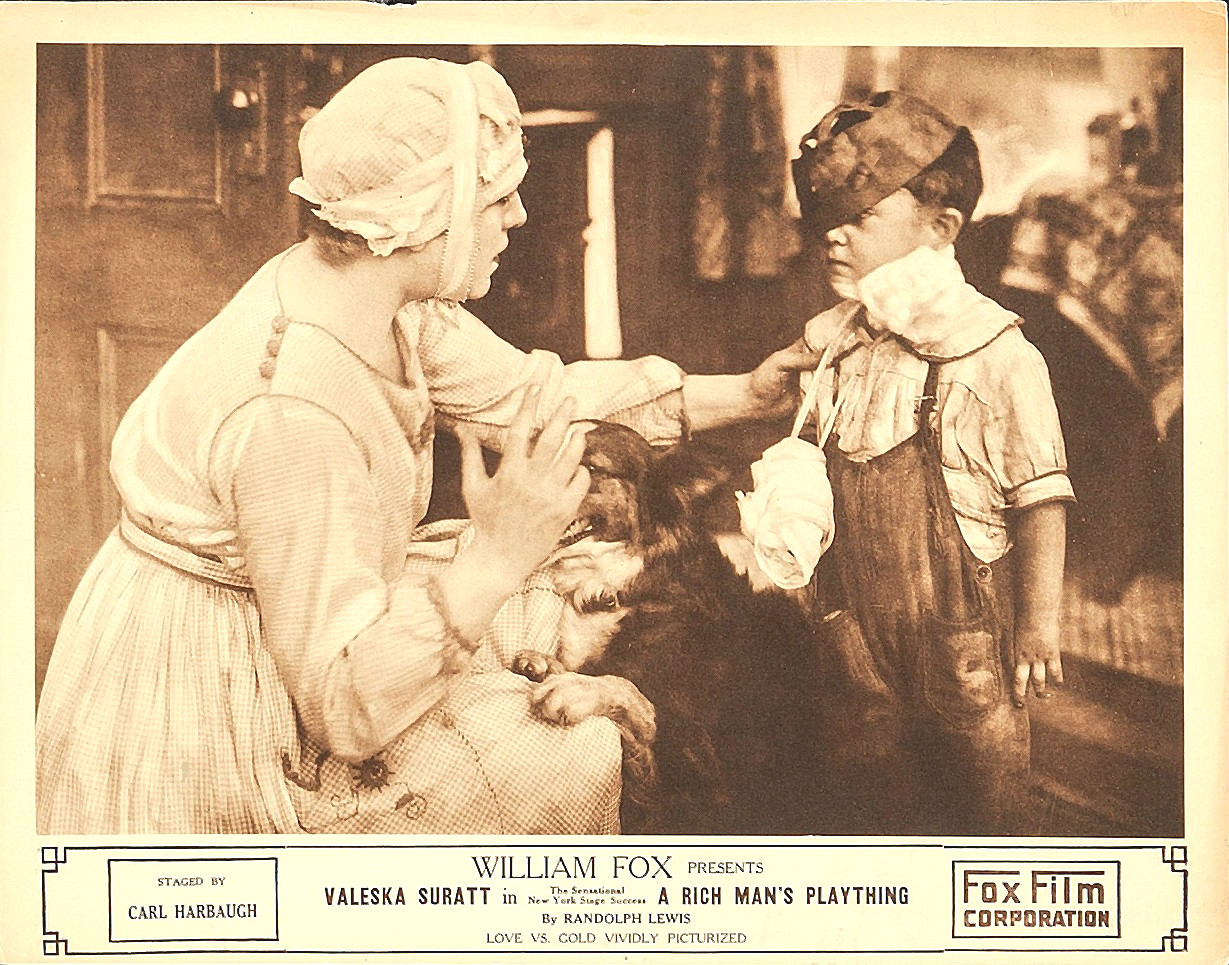
- Lobby card
- Directed by: Carl Harbaugh
- Written by: Carl Harbaugh
- Story by: Randolph Lewis
- Starring: Valeska Suratt
- Distributed by: Fox Film Corporation
- Release date: September 30, 1917 (United States)
- Country: United States
- Language: Silent (English intertitles)

A Rich Man's Plaything is a 1917 American silent drama film produced and distributed by the Fox Film Corporation. The film starred Valeska Suratt in her final film role. A Rich Man's Plaything is now considered lost. It is one of many silent films that were destroyed in a fire at Fox's film storage facility in Little Ferry, New Jersey in July 1937.

== Plot ==
As described in a film magazine, Marie, employed in a New England Cannery, meets "Iron" Lloyd, a millionaire financier and tenement owner, whose yacht is cruising off the coast. He poses as a stoker and soon learns from Mary that, if she had the means, she would wage battle against the oppressive tenement lords. As a test, Lloyd, whom she knows as Strange, has his lawyer transfer a fortune to her as a legacy from a lost relative. Mary goes to New York and starts her fight against Lloyd. Ogden Deneau, Lloyd's rival in business, associates himself with Mary, pretending to be interested in her work but planning to crush Lloyd. But she has an old score to settle with Deneau and enlists Strange's aid. On the day of the great coup, she arranges to meet Deneau at a country inn, and there exposes him to his wife. Returning to the city she learns from Strange that Deneau is bankrupt and that Strange is really Lloyd. She is furious as first, but relents when Lloyd tells her that he was testing her and asks her to start life anew with him.

== Cast ==
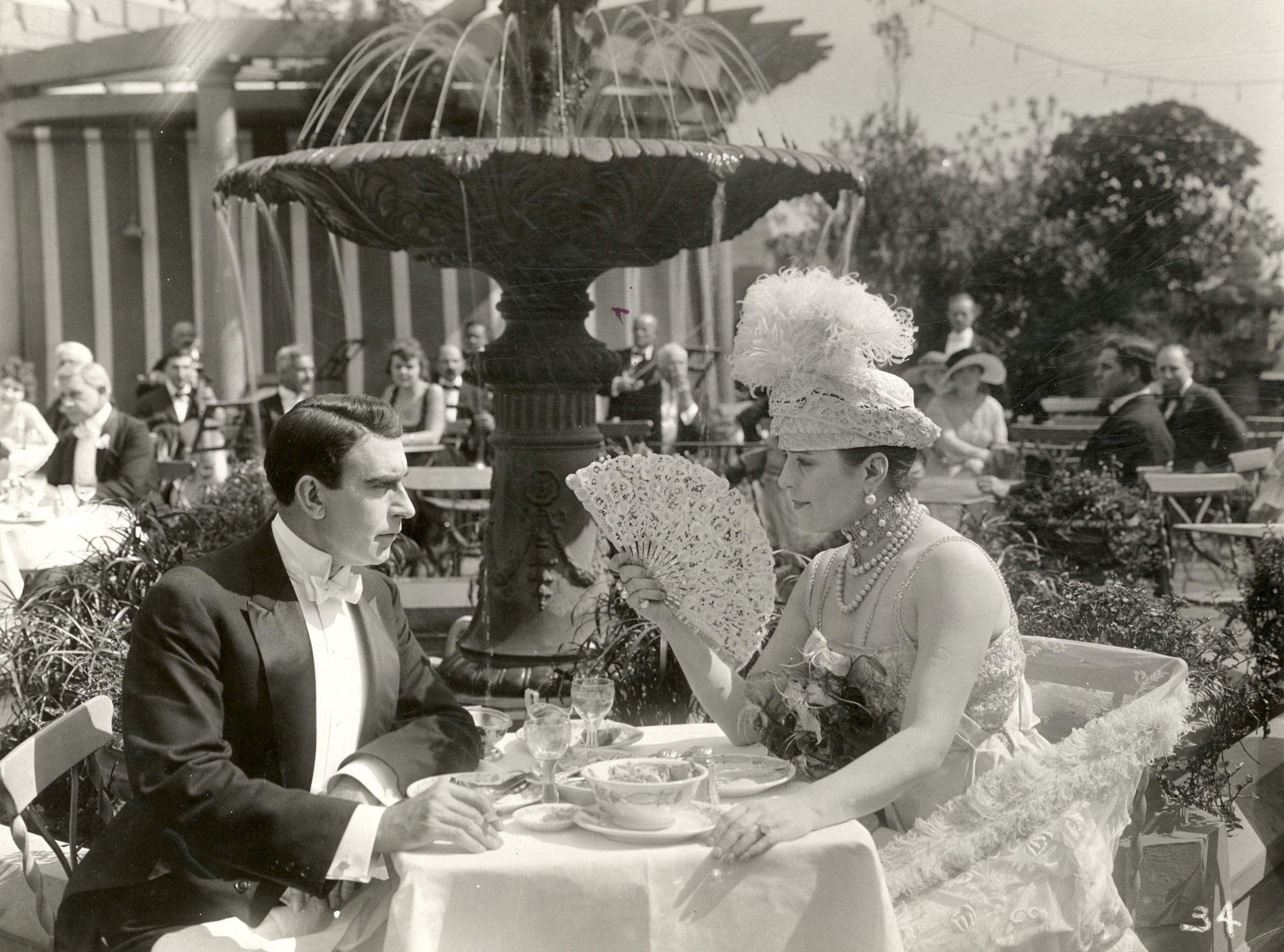
Scene from the film

- Valeska Suratt - Marie Grandon
- Edward Martindel - "Iron" Lloyd
- John T. Dillon - Ogden Deneau
- Charles Craig - Lawyer Sharp
- Robert Cummings - 'Smash' Regan
- Gladys Kelly - Mrs. Deneau
