= The Spitfire (1914 film) =

- Directed by: Edwin S. Porter; Frederick A. Thomson
- Based on: The Spitfire; 1910 play by Edward Peple
- Produced by: Daniel Frohman
- Starring: Carlyle Blackwell; Violet Mersereau; Lionel Adams; Robert Cummings; William R. Dunn; Redfield Clarke
- Production company: Famous Players Film Company
- Distributed by: Paramount Pictures
- Release date: June 20, 1914
- Country: United States
- Language: English

The Spitfire is a 1914 American comedy film directed by Edwin S. Porter and Frederick A. Thomson, written by Edward Henry Peple, and starring Carlyle Blackwell, Violet Mersereau, Lionel Adams, Robert Cummings, William R. Dunn and Redfield Clarke. It was released on June 20, 1914, by Paramount Pictures.

== Cast ==
- Carlyle Blackwell as Bruce Morson
- Violet Mersereau as Valda Girard
- Lionel Adams as James Ormond
- Robert Cummings as Tracy
- William R. Dunn as Beasley
- Redfield Clarke as Marcus Girard
- June Dale as Cousin Polly
- Lois Arnold as Aunt Mary

== See also ==
- Edwin S. Porter filmography
