= The Trap (1918 film) =

- Directed by: George Archainbaud
- Written by: Robert F. Hill
- Starring: Alice Brady; Curtis Cooksey; Robert Cummings; Frank Mayo
- Production company: World Film Company
- Release date: April 15, 1918
- Running time: 50 minutes
- Country: United States
- Language: Silent (English intertitles)

The Trap is a silent film directed by George Archainbaud. It was released by the World Film Company on April 15, 1918. The cast was led by Alice Brady as Doris Shaw, Curtis Cooksey as Jack Masterson, Crawford Kent as Stuart Kendall, Robert Cummings as David Shaw, and Frank Mayo as Nat Fletcher. The plot involves a love triangle between Doris, Jack, and Stuart.
