= The Ivory Snuff Box =

1915 film by Maurice Tourneur

- Directed by: Maurice Tourneur
- Written by: E. Magnus Ingleton; Frederic Arnold Kummer
- Produced by: William A. Brady
- Starring: Holbrook Blinn; Alma Belwin; Norman Trevor
- Edited by: Clarence Brown
- Production company: William A. Brady Picture Plays
- Distributed by: World Film
- Release date: November 13, 1915
- Country: United States
- Languages: Silent; English intertitles

The Ivory Snuff Box is a 1915 American silent mystery film directed by Maurice Tourneur and starring Holbrook Blinn, Alma Belwin and Norman Trevor.

== Cast ==
- Holbrook Blinn as Richard Duvall
- Alma Belwin as Grace Ellicot
- Norman Trevor as Dr. Hartmann
- Robert Cummings as Prefect of Police

== Bibliography ==
- Waldman, Harry. Maurice Tourneur: The Life and Films. McFarland, 2001.
