= Dan (film) =

Dan is a 1914 American silent film. George Irving and John H. Pratt directed. Hal Reid wrote the screenplay.

A drama set in the American Civil War it is about a slave who helps the son of his "master" escape from a Union Army prison. Manuel Klein arranged the musical accompaniment for the film.

Hal Reid wrote the screenplay. The film was produced by All-Star Feature Company film.

== Cast ==
- Lew Dockstader as Dan
- Lois Meredith as Lila Dabney
- Gail Kane as Grace Dabney
- Beatrice Clevenger as Elsie Hammond
- Hal Reid as Colonel Dabney
- George Cowl as Raoul Dabney
- W. D. Fischter as John Hammond
- Jonas Watts as William Conklin
- John H. Pratt as Stonewall Jackson

== See also ==
- 1914 in film
