= Garrick Theatre (Philadelphia) =

Demolished theater in Philadelphia, PA

Coordinates: 39.951°N 75.163°W

The Garrick Theatre was a theatre located in Philadelphia, Pennsylvania. Designed by the architect Willis G. Hale, it opened to the public in 1901 and remained active as a theatre as late as January 1936. By January 1937, the theatre had been demolished after the property's owners at that time, the Girard Trust Company, decided replacing the theatre with a parking lot would be more financially profitable.

== History ==
The Garrick Theatre was located at 1330 Chestnut Street. Designed by architect Willis G. Hale, the theatre sat 1,561 people. The theatre featured the work of the Conkling-Armstrong Terra Cotta Company which decorated the theatre with ornate spandrels.

Built and originally owned by the chemical manufacturer and Philadelphia real estate businessman William Weightman, the Garrick Theatre was leased and managed by Frank Howe Jr. The theatre opened on October 11, 1901, with a performance of Booth Tarkington's Monsieur Beaucaire; a stage adaptation of his novel which starred Richard Mansfield. Not long after its opening, the theatre, while still managed by Howe, was acquired by the Shubert family and became a part of their circuit of American theaters which housed productions which they toured across the country in the many theaters they operated.

The Garrick Theatre was still operating as a theatre as late as January 6, 1936 when the theatre presented the world premiere of the father and son writing team Owen and Donald Davis's stage adaptation of Edith Wharton's Ethan Frome. However, by January 7, 1937, the theatre had been demolished. The Girard Trust Company (GTC) acquired the theatre along with adjacent property on November 4, 1929; just one month after the Wall Street crash of 1929. In order to make the property more financially profitable, the GTC demolished the theatre to make room for a parking lot.

== Notable premieres ==
- Mary (under the original title The house that Jack built) musical with book and lyrics by Frank Mandel and Otto Harbach and music by Louis Hirsch; premiered at the Garrick Theatre on April 5, 1920.
- Nemesis, play in four acts by Augustus Thomas; premiered at the Garrick Theatre on March 21, 1921.
- Cinders, musical with book and lyrics by Edward Clark and music by Rudolf Friml; premiered at the Garrick Theatre on March 12, 1923.

== Bibliography ==
- Irvin R. Glazer (1986). "Hale, Willis G.". Philadelphia Theatres, A-Z: A Comprehensive, Descriptive, Record of 813 Theatres Constructed Since 1724. Bloomsbury Academic. ISBN 9780313240546.
- William Richard Cutter, ed. (1914). New England Families, Genealogical and Memorial: A Record of the Achievements of Her People in the Making of Commonwealths and the Founding of a Nation, Volume 1. Lewis Historical Publishing Company.
