= Augustus Thomas =

American playwright

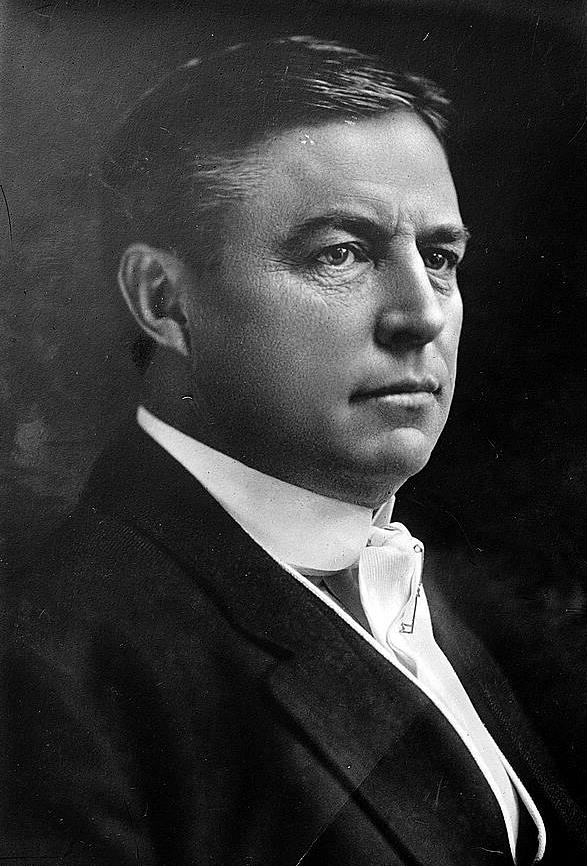
- Born: January 8, 1857; St. Louis, Missouri, US
- Died: August 12, 1934 (aged 77); Nyack, New York, US
- Other name: Gus
- Occupation: Playwright
- Years active: 1889–1926

Augustus Thomas (January 8, 1857 – August 12, 1934) was an American playwright.

== Biography ==
Born in St. Louis, Missouri, the son of a medical doctor, Thomas worked a number of jobs including as a page in the 41st Congress, studying law, and gaining some practical railway work experience before he turned to journalism and became editor of the Kansas City Mirror in 1889. Thomas had been writing since his teens when he wrote plays and even organized a small theatrical touring company.

Thomas was hired to work as an assistant at Pope's Theatre in St. Louis. During this time, he wrote a one-act play called Editha's Burglar, based on a short story by Frances Hodgson Burnett called The Burglar. After touring in the play, he expanded the show to four acts, renamed it The Burglar, and was able to get Maurice Barrymore to play the title role. Subsequently, he was hired to succeed Dion Boucicault adapting foreign plays for the Madison Square Theatre.

His first successful play, Alabama, was produced by Kirke La Shelle in 1891 and its financial reward allowed Thomas to write full-time. Alabama is the story of an un-reconstructed Confederate. Notably, Thomas was one of the first playwrights to make use of American material. Other plays along the same lines include In Mizzoura (1893), Arizona (1900), Colorado (1900) and Rio Grande (1916). Perhaps his most successful play was The Copperhead (1918) which made Lionel Barrymore a star.

Thomas joined The Lambs theatrical club in 1889 and served as its president from 1907 to 1910. In 1913, he was the first recipient of the Gold Medal for Drama from the American Academy of Arts and Letters.

He died in 1934 and was buried in Bellefontaine Cemetery in St. Louis.

== Select works ==
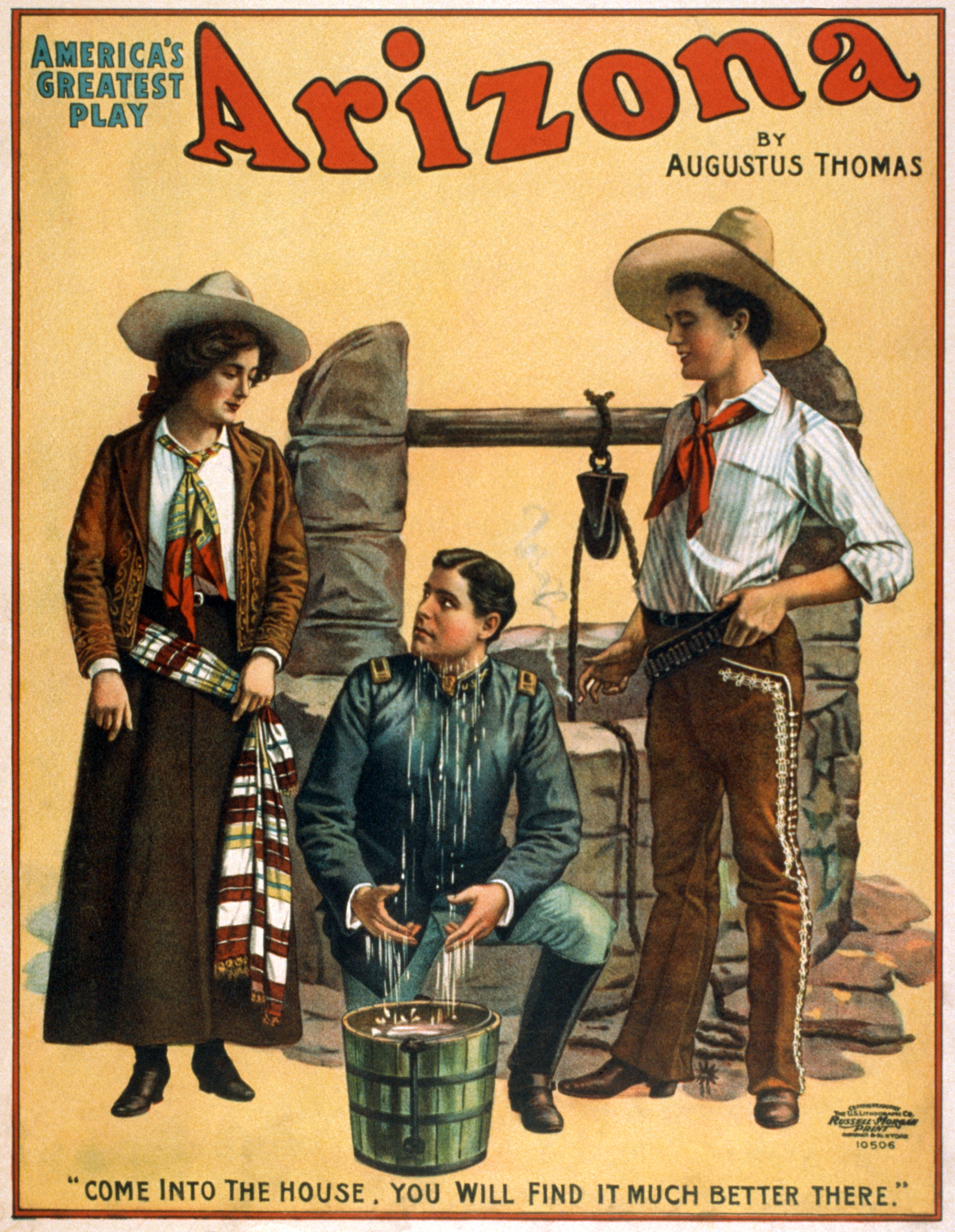
1907 playbill for Arizona

- Editha's Burglar, 1884
- The Burglar, 1889
- A Man of the World, 1889
- Reckless Temple, 1890
- A Woman of the World, 1890
- Alabama, 1891
- Colonel Carter of Cartersville, 1892
- In Mizzoura, 1893
- New Blood, 1894
- Arizona, 1900
- Oliver Goldsmith, 1900
- Colorado, 1900
- Soldiers of Fortune, 1902 (from 1897 Richard Harding Davis novel)
- The Earl of Pawtucket, 1903
- The Other Girl, 1903
- Mrs. Leffingwell's Boots, 1905
- The Embassy Ball, 1906
- The Witching Hour, 1907
- The Harvest Moon, 1909
- The Member from Ozark, 1910
- As a Man Thinks, 1911
- The Copperhead, 1918
- Nemesis, 1921
- The Print of My Remembrance (autobiography), 1922
- Still Waters, 1926

== Select filmography ==
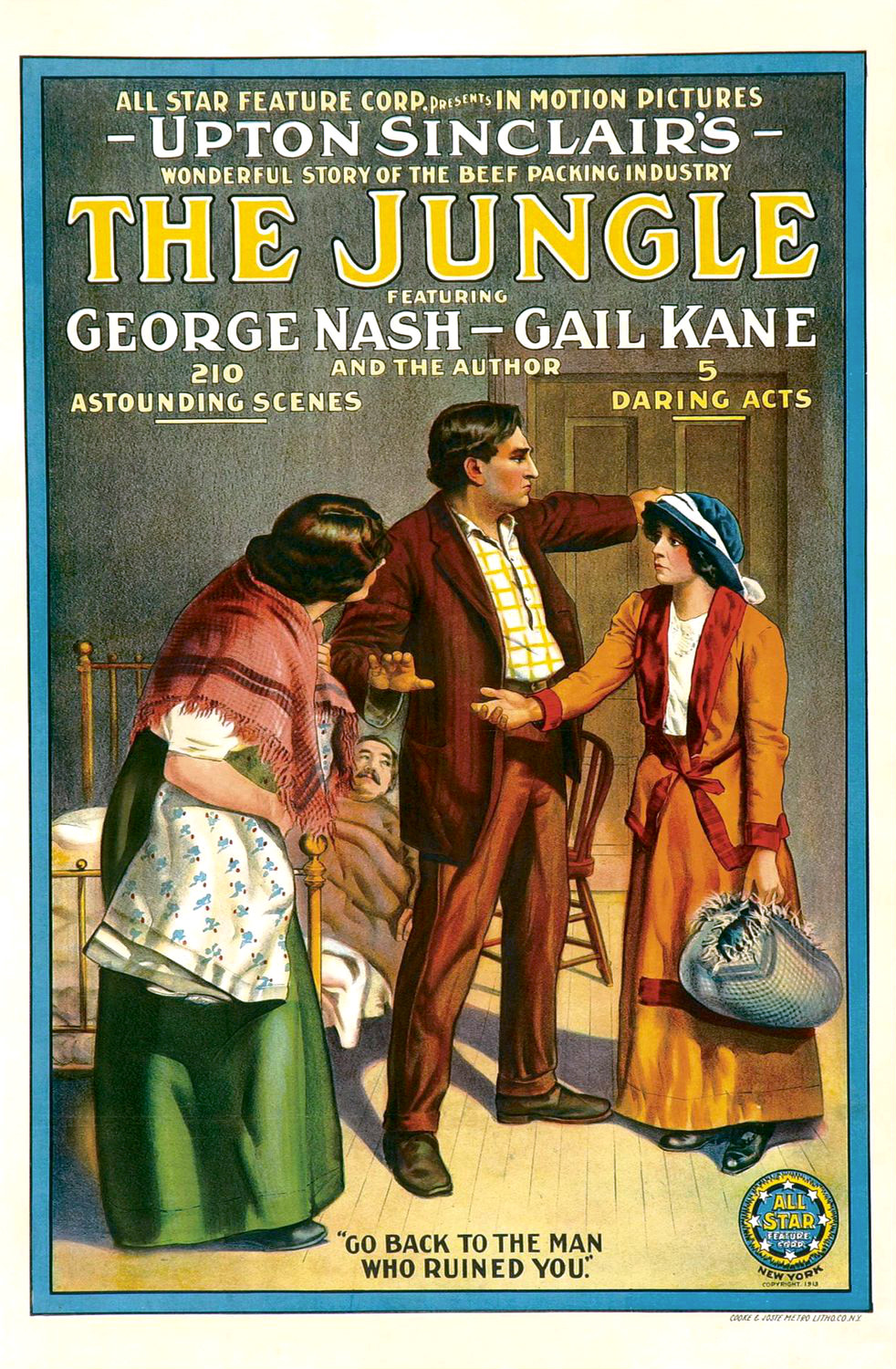
Poster for The Jungle (1914), directed by Augustus Thomas, George Irving and John H. Pratt

- Arizona (1913)
- The Jungle (1914)
- Shore Acres (1914)
- Paid in Full (1914)
- The Nightingale (1914)
- Arizona (1918)
- The Capitol (1919)
- The Copperhead (1920)
- The Bonnie Brier Bush (1921)
- Thirty Days (1922)
- The Family Secret (1924)
- Arizona (1931)
