= Right of way (disambiguation) =

A right of way is a transportation corridor along which people, animals, vehicles, watercraft, or utility lines travel, or the legal status that gives them the right to do so.

Right of way or right-of-way may refer to:

== Film ==
- Right of Way (film), a 1983 television film drama
- The Right of Way (1915 film), a lost silent film
- The Right of Way (1920 film), an American film starring Bert Lytell
- The Right of Way (1931 film), an American film starring Conrad Nagel and Loretta Young

== Other uses ==
- Right of way (traffic), giving a certain party priority to proceed first when there is conflicting traffic
- Priority (fencing), or right of way, a rule in foil and sabre fencing
- Right of Way (album), by Ferry Corsten, 2003

== See also ==
- Visual flight rules, for air pilots
- Rights of way in England and Wales
- International Regulations for Preventing Collisions at Sea#No right-of-way
- International Right of Way Association
- J Church, a light rail line of the Muni Metro system in San Francisco, California, with 3 stations called Right of Way
