= The Right of Way (1931 film) =

1931 film

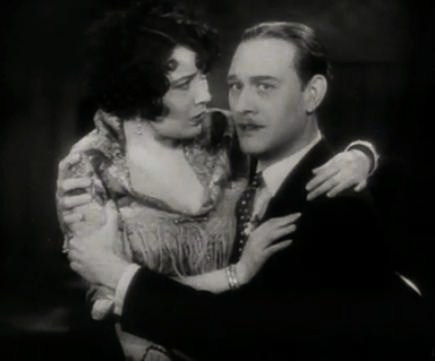
- Yola d'Avril and Conrad Nagel in The Right of Way
- Directed by: Frank Lloyd (uncredited)
- Written by: Francis Edward Faragoh (adaptation)
- Based on: The Right of Way (novel) by Gilbert Parker
- Produced by: Frank Lloyd
- Starring: Conrad Nagel; Loretta Young
- Cinematography: John F. Seitz
- Edited by: Terry O. Morse
- Music by: Rex Dunn (uncredited); Alois Reiser (uncredited)
- Production company: First National Pictures
- Distributed by: First National Pictures
- Release date: February 7, 1931
- Running time: 68 minutes
- Country: United States
- Language: English

The Right of Way is a 1930 American pre-Code film, released in 1931, directed by Frank Lloyd and produced and distributed by First National Pictures. It stars Conrad Nagel and Loretta Young --then only 17-- in one of her first talking roles. The story was filmed previously in 1915 and in 1920.This version maintains the expressionist, melodramatic style of the silent era, utilizing intertitles between scenes.

== Plot ==
Snobbish attorney Charles 'Beauty' Steele loses his wife due to his drinking and his airs at the same time that his brother-in-law absconds with funds belonging to one of Steele's clients. In search of the thief, Steele is attacked and left for dead. He is rescued by a kindly couple, but suffers from amnesia. He starts life afresh and is happy, until the return of his memory sends him back to resolve his old involvements.

== Cast ==
- Conrad Nagel as Charley "Beauty" Steele
- Loretta Young as Rosalie Evantural
- Fred Kohler as Joseph Portugais
- William Janney as Billy Wantage
- Snitz Edwards as Luis Trudel
- George C. Pearce as The Cure
- Halliwell Hobbes as The Seigneur
- Olive Tell as Kathleen
- Brandon Hurst as Crown Attorney
- Yola d'Avril as Suzette

== Preservation status ==
A copy of The Right of Way is preserved at the Library of Congress.
