= The Lady of Red Butte =

1919 film directed by Victor Schertzinger

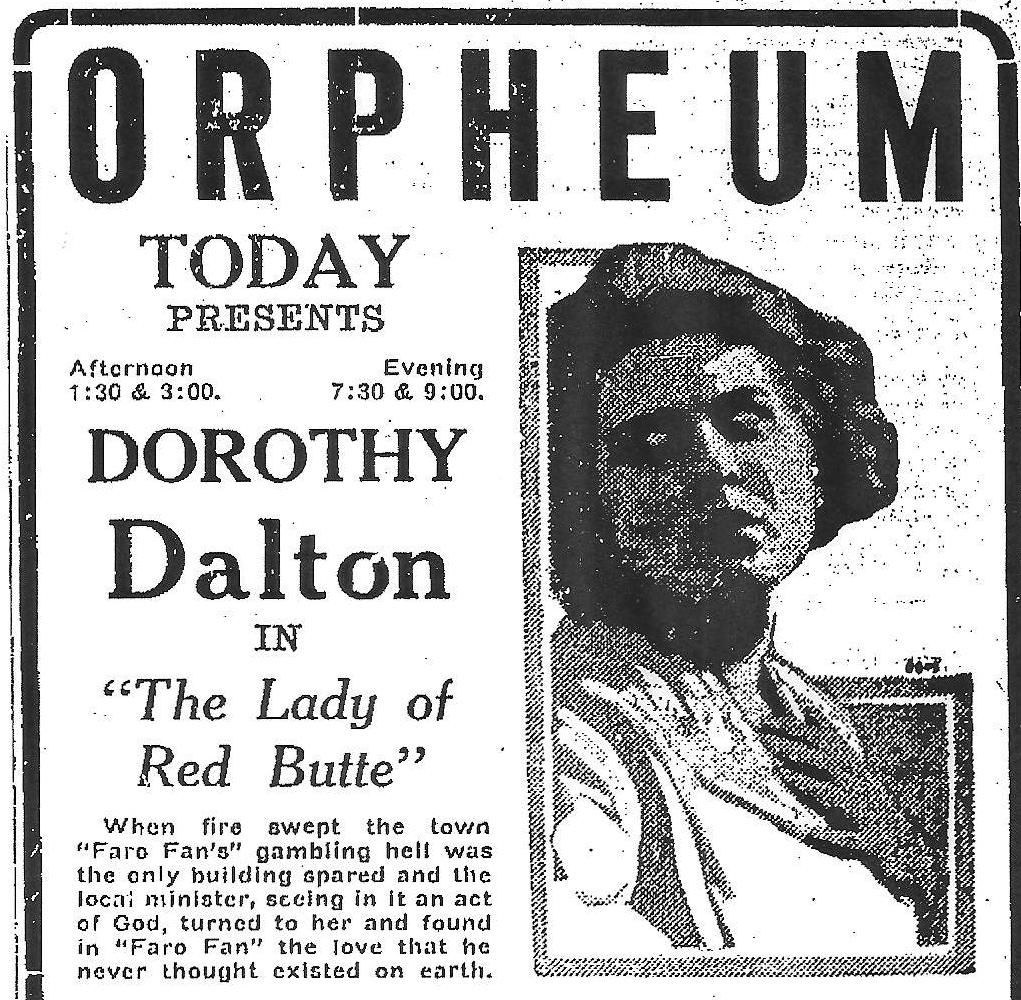
- Newspaper advertisement, September 1919
- Directed by: Victor Schertzinger
- Written by: C. Gardner Sullivan
- Produced by: Thomas H. Ince
- Starring: Dorothy Dalton; Thomas Holding; Tully Marshall
- Cinematography: John Stumar
- Edited by: Ralph Dixon
- Production company: Thomas H. Ince Corporation
- Distributed by: Paramount Pictures
- Release date: May 18, 1919
- Running time: 60 minutes
- Country: United States
- Languages: Silent; English intertitles

The Lady of Red Butte is a 1919 American silent Western film written by C. Gardner Sullivan and directed by Victor Schertzinger. Dorothy Dalton stars as a benevolent saloonkeeper in conflict with a fanatical religious zealot played by Thomas Holding. It is not known whether the film currently survives, and it may be a lost film.

== Plot ==
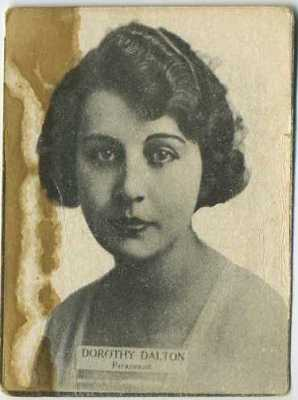
Dorothy Dalton portrays Faro Fan.

Faro Fan inherits a saloon and gambling hall in Red Butte and runs it with such wholesomeness that she has a positive influence on the peaceful town. Fan also devotes her time to the care of a group of orphans she has adopted. Everything is peace and harmony when an evangelist, Webster Smith, arrives in Red Butte. "Fanatically devout, crack-brained and believing every word of his intolerant dogma, he calls forth a curse on the gambling house and all who are in it." A fever strikes the town's inhabitants, and Smith takes credit for it. Smith then prays for a fire to cleanse the town and destroy every building except the church as a sign of his wrath and mercy. A fire does sweep through the town, but it destroys Webster's church and every other building in Red Butte except Faro Fan's saloon. The salvation of the gambling house sends the religious fanatic into a rage, and he attacks the Lady of Red Butte. She hits him on the head, and his sanity is restored. He then becomes the personification of love and kindliness and later wins the Lady's heart.

== Production ==
For the scene showing the destruction of Red Butte, an entire western street was built of solid lumber and then burned to the ground at a cost of several thousand dollars. The village was two blocks long with buildings on both sides of the street. It was built at Inceville on a high elevation far from all other buildings so the flames would not spread to other property. The Santa Monica Fire Department and one chemical wagon from Los Angeles Fire Department were on hand to prevent the flames spreading to the shrubbery and timber on the mountains. When Thomas H. Ince gave the word, the fire was ignited, and the flames were "fanned into a fury by three huge wind machines." Between the walls of roaring flames, Dorothy Dalton, Thomas Holding and the two hundred players acted several dramatic scenes, as seven cameras shot the action under the direction of Victor L. Schertzinger and the supervision of Ince.

== Cast ==
- Dorothy Dalton as Faro Fan
- Thomas Holding as Webster Smith
- Tully Marshall as Spanish Ed
- William Courtright as Hoodoo
- Josef Swickard as Delicate Hanson
- May Giraci as Sugar Plum

== Critical reception ==
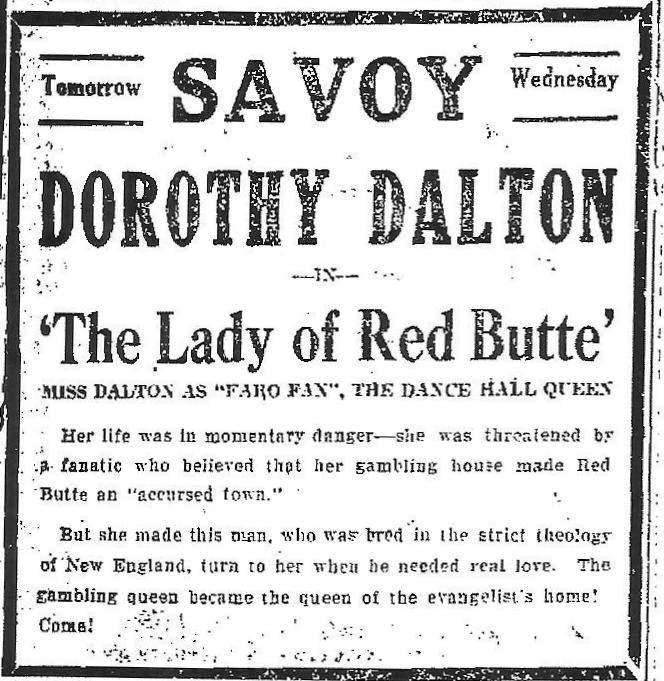
Newspaper ad for The Lady of Red Butte, May 1919

According to the critic for the Waterloo Times, Sullivan's screenplay "is filled with situations of an unusual character." The reviewer for the Lethbridge Herald noted, "A remarkable cast was chosen by Thomas H. Ince for the presentation of C. Gardner Sullivan's latest photoplay The Lady of Red Butte." Focusing on Dalton's performance, another reviewer wrote: "Dorothy Dalton comes back in the style of role which made her famous early in her screen career, that of a western girl untutored to a large extent, living amid rugged surroundings, but developing a finesse in her inner nature that renders her entirely lovable despite her somewhat uncouth exterior."
