= The Vagabond Prince =

Film directed by Charles Giblyn

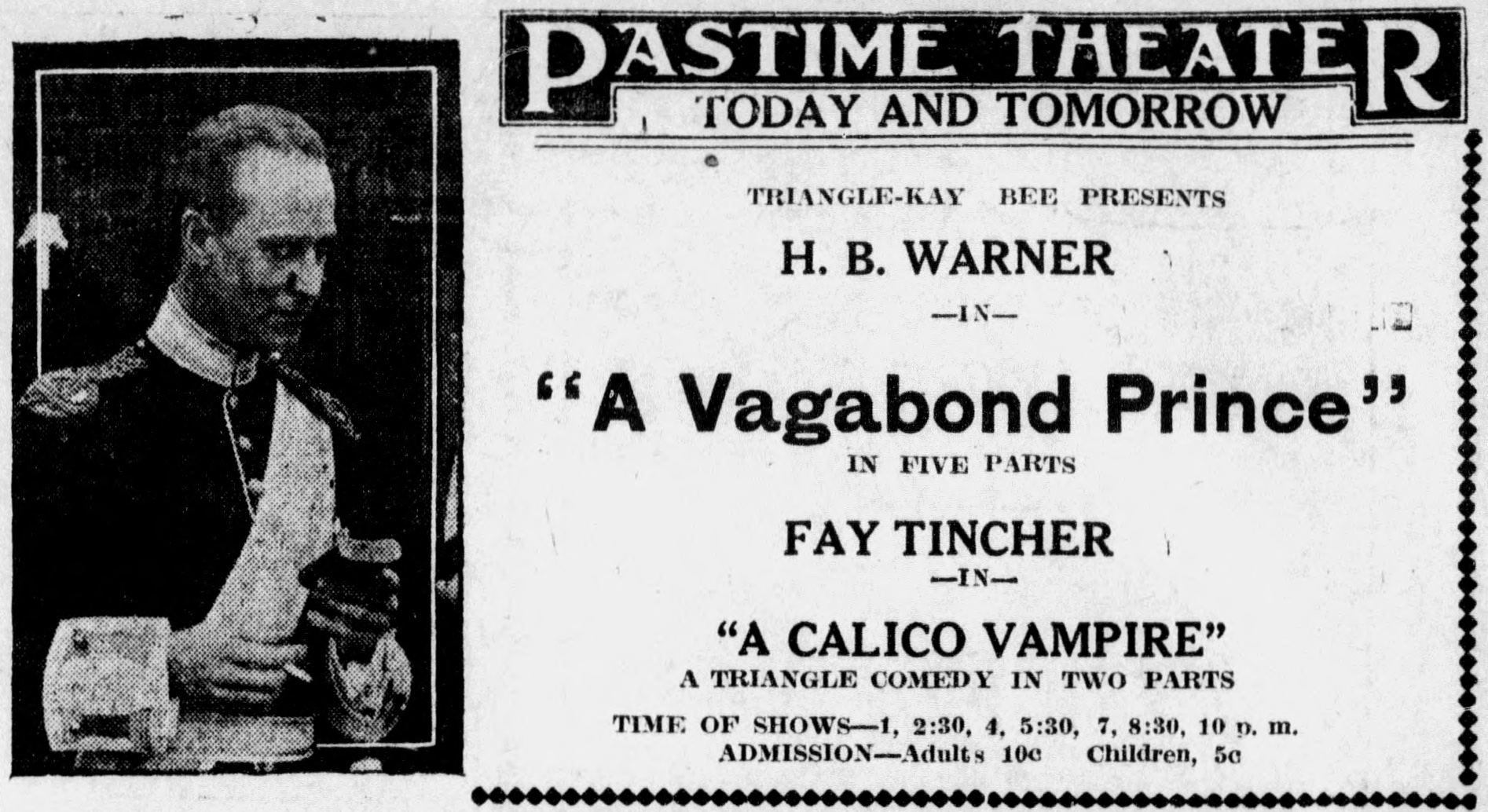
- Contemporary advertisement
- Directed by: Charles Giblyn
- Written by: J. G. Hawks
- Produced by: Thomas H. Ince
- Starring: H. B. Warner; Dorothy Dalton
- Cinematography: Dal Clawson
- Distributed by: Triangle Film Corporation
- Release date: October 22, 1916
- Running time: 5 reels
- Country: USA
- Language: Silent..English

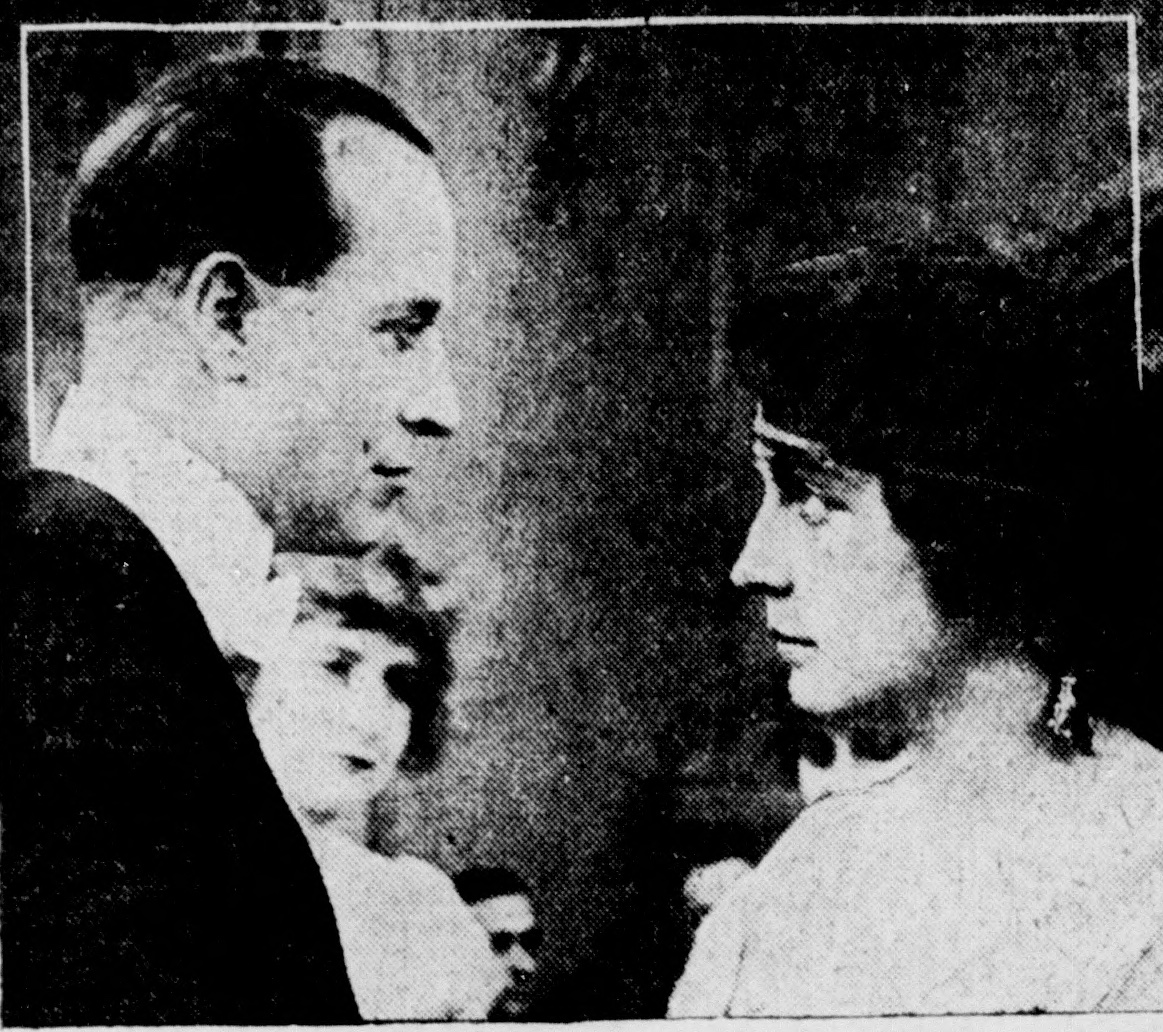
Scene from the film

The Vagabond Prince is a 1916 American silent drama film directed by Charles Giblyn and starring H. B. Warner and Dorothy Dalton. It was produced by Thomas H. Ince and distributed by Triangle.

== Cast ==
- H. B. Warner - Prince Torio
- Dorothy Dalton - Lola "Fluffy"
- Roy Laidlaw - Burton Randall
- Katherine Kirkwood - Princess Athalia
- Charles K. French - "Spud" Murphy
- James McLaughlin - "Red" Kelly (J.W. McLaughlin)
- J. Frank Burke - Count Sergis Metropolski
- Aggie Herring - Mrs. Finnegan

== Preservation status ==
- The film survives and is on DVD.
