= Her Fighting Chance =

1917 silent film directed by Edwin Carewe

- Directed by: Edwin Carewe
- Based on: the short story, "The Fiddling Man" by James Oliver Curwood
- Starring: Jane Grey; Thomas Holding; Percy G. Standing
- Cinematography: Arthur Martinelli
- Production company: A H Jacobs Photoplays
- Distributed by: Frank G Hall; State Rights
- Release date: May 15, 1917 (US)
- Running time: 5 reels
- Country: United States
- Language: English

Her Fighting Chance is a 1917 American silent drama film. Directed by Edwin Carewe, the film stars Jane Grey, Thomas Holding, and Percy G. Standing. The film was based on a short story by James Oliver Curwood titled "The Fiddling Man," which originally appeared in Every Week Magazine in 1917. It was released in May, 1917.

== Cast ==
- Jane Grey as Marie
- Thomas Holding as Jan Thoreau
- Percy G. Standing as Corporal Blake
- Edward Porter as Sergeant Fitzgerald
- Fred Jones as François Breault
- William Cohill as Pastamoo

== Censorship ==
Before Her Fighting Chance could be exhibited in Kansas, the Kansas Board of Review required the removal of an intertitle saying "Keep your word with me tonight, etc."

== Preservation ==
Her Fighting Chance is currently presumed lost. In February of 2021, the film was cited by the National Film Preservation Board on their Lost U.S. Silent Feature Films list.
