= The White Monkey =

1925 film directed by Phil Rosen

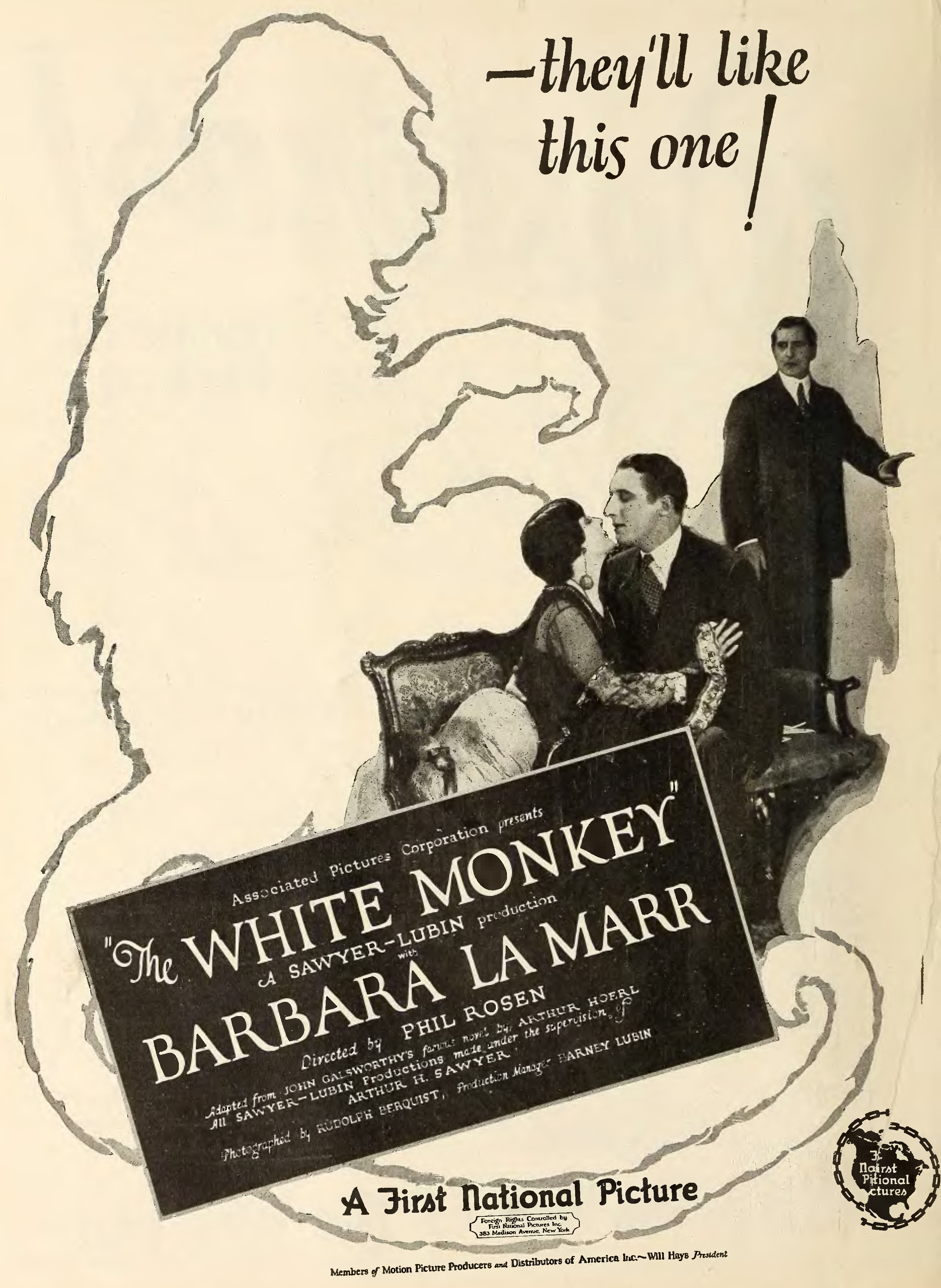
- Seattle, Washington, theater showing the film
- Directed by: Phil Rosen
- Written by: Arthur Hoerl (adaptation); Louis Sherwin (titles)
- Based on: the novel, The White Monkey by John Galsworthy
- Produced by: Arthur H. Sawyer
- Starring: Barbara La Marr; Thomas Holding; Henry Victor
- Cinematography: Rudolph Bergquist
- Edited by: Teddy Hanscom
- Music by: Charles Previn
- Production company: Associated Pictures
- Distributed by: First National Pictures
- Release date: June 7, 1925 (US)
- Running time: 7 reels
- Country: United States
- Language: Silent (English intertitles)

The White Monkey is a 1925 American silent drama film, directed by Phil Rosen and starring Barbara La Marr, Thomas Holding, and Henry Victor, and based on a part of John Galsworthy's Forsyte Saga. It was released by First National Pictures on June 7, 1925.

== Plot ==
As described in a film magazine review, Fleur, daughter of Soames Forsyte, marries Michael Mont, whose best friend Wilfrid Desert, author, painter, and traveler, is also in love with her. He knows that Fleur married Michael without any love for him. When Fleur refuses to allow him to leave London, he decides that he has a chance to win her. Wilfrid tells Michael that he will win her away from him if he can. Michael, also of the generation after the war, refuses to coerce Fleur or attempt any heroics with Wilfred. He later discovers them together after she has told him that she has gone.

== Cast list ==
- Barbara La Marr as Fleur Forsyte
- Thomas Holding as Michael Mont
- Henry Victor as Wilfrid Desert
- George Marion Sr. as Soames Forsyte
- Colin Campbell as Ethelbert Danby
- Charles Mack as Tony Bicket
- Flora Le Breton as Victorine
- Tammany Young as Bill Hawks

== Preservation ==
An incomplete print of The White Monkey is located at the Library of Congress and the Wisconsin Center for Film and Theater Research. The surviving material comprises reels 1–2 and 4–7, with the third reel missing.
