= The Flaming Sword (1915 film) =

1915 film

- Directed by: Edwin Middleton
- Written by: George Gibbs (novel)
- Produced by: B. A. Rolfe
- Starring: Lionel Barrymore; Jane Grey
- Distributed by: Metro Pictures
- Release date: June 28, 1915
- Running time: 5 reels
- Country: USA
- Language: Silent...English titles

The Flaming Sword is a lost 1915 silent film drama directed by Edwin Middleton and starring Lionel Barrymore and Jane Grey. It was produced and distributed by Metro Pictures.

== Cast ==
- Lionel Barrymore - Steve
- Jane Grey - Meera Calhoun
- Edith Diestel - ? (*as Miss Diestel)
- Mrs. Middleton - ? (*as Mrs. E. Middleton)
- Glen White - ? (*as Glenn White)
