= Sir Gilbert Parker, 1st Baronet =

Canadian novelist and British politician (1862–1932)

The Right Honourable Sir Gilbert Parker Bt
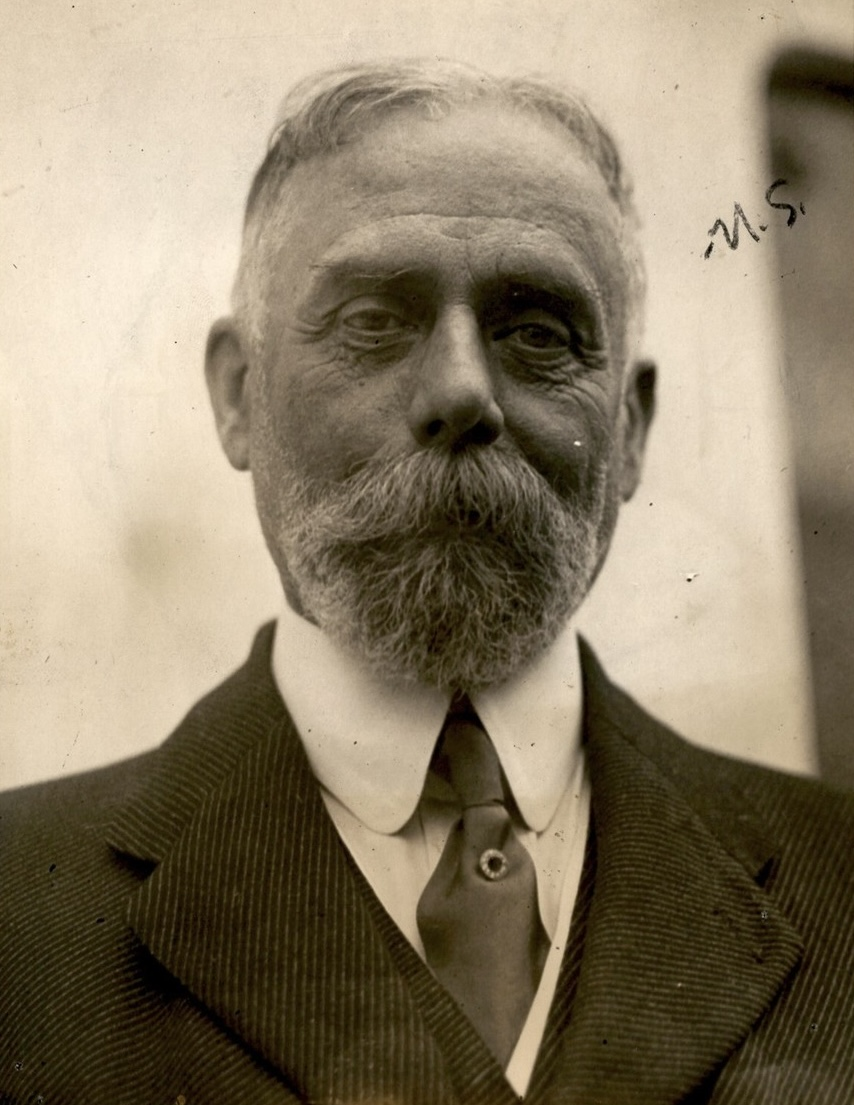
- Parker in 1922

Member of Parliament for Gravesend
- In office 25 October 1900 – 27 May 1918
- Preceded by: Viscount Sandon
- Succeeded by: Sir Alexander Richardson

Personal details
- Born: Horatio Gilbert George Parker; 23 November 1862 Camden East, Addington, Ontario
- Died: 6 September 1932 (aged 69) London, England
- Education: University of Toronto
- Occupation: Writer, politician

Sir Horatio Gilbert George Parker, 1st Baronet PC (23 November 1862 – 6 September 1932), known as Gilbert Parker, Canadian novelist and British politician, was born at Camden East, Addington, Ontario, the son of Captain Joseph Parker, R.A.

== Education and employment ==
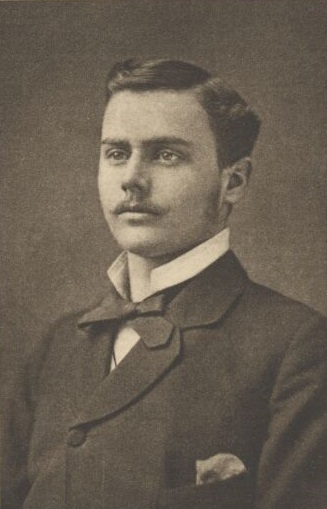
Parker at age 18

He was educated as a teacher in Ottawa and taught at Marsh Hill and Bayside schools in Hastings County before becoming a teacher at the Ontario Institute for the Deaf and Dumb (in Belleville, Ontario) in 1882. From there he went on to lecture at Trinity College, federated with the University of Toronto. In 1886, he went to Australia, and for a while became associate editor of the Sydney Morning Herald. He also traveled extensively in the Pacific, Europe, Asia, Egypt, the South Sea Islands and subsequently in northern Canada. In the early nineties, he began to gain a growing reputation in London as a writer of romantic fiction.

== Published works ==
The best of his novels are those in which he first took for his subject the history and life of the French Canadians; and his permanent literary reputation rests on the fine quality, descriptive and dramatic, of his Canadian stories. Pierre and his People (1892) was followed by Mrs. Falchion (1893), The Trail of the Sword (1894), When Valmond came to Pontiac (1895), An Adventurer of Icy North (1895), and The Seats of the Mighty (1896, dramatized in 1897). The Seats of the Mighty was a historical novel depicting the English conquest of New France (Quebec) with the two opposing generals, James Wolfe and the Marquis de Montcalm, as two of the book's characters.

The Lane that Had No Turning (1900), a collection of short stories set in the fictional Quebec town of Pontiac, contains some of his best work, and is viewed by some as being in the tradition of such Gothic classics as Stoker's Dracula and James's The Turn of the Screw. In The Battle of the Strong (1898) he broke new ground, laying his scene in the Channel Islands. His chief later books were The Right of Way (1901), Donovan Pasha (1902), The Ladder of Swords (1904), The Weavers (1907), Northern Lights (1909), The Judgment House (1913), The Promised Land: A Story of David in Israel (1920), and The Power and the Glory (1925). Parker had three that made it into the top 10 on the annual list of bestselling novels in the United States, two of which were on it for two years in a row. The 1905 New International Encyclopaedia claimed that it was the "dramatic quality of his . . . books [which] won for them [their] considerable popularity, despite their disregard of truth in local color."

Sir Gilbert Parker is also known for his poetry, in particular the sonnet Reunited. The English composer Sir Edward Elgar set to music three of Parker's romantic poems: Oh, soft was the song, Twilight, Was it some Golden Star? in 1910, as part of an uncompleted song-cycle, his Op. 59. Elgar also set to music his little poem Inside the Bar, written in 1917 as a sequel to his setting of Kipling's wartime nautical poems in The Fringes of the Fleet.

== Other activities ==
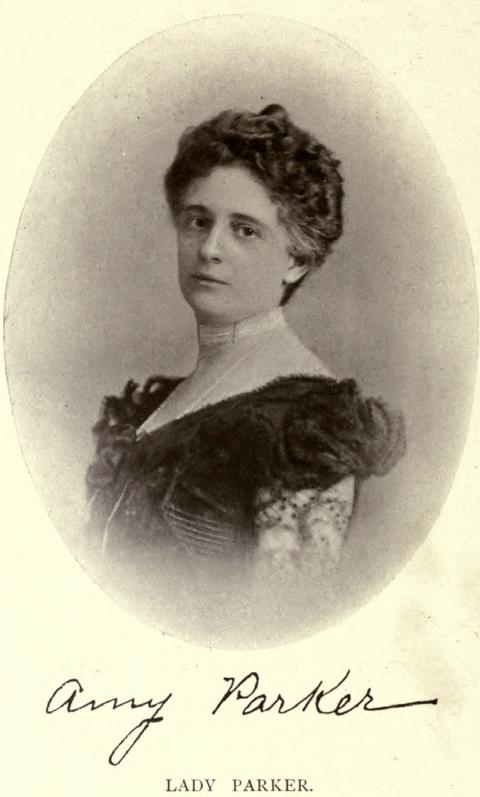
Lady Amy Parker by Elliott & Fry

In December 1895 Parker married Miss Amy VanTine of New York City, a wealthy heiress, daughter of Ashley VanTine.

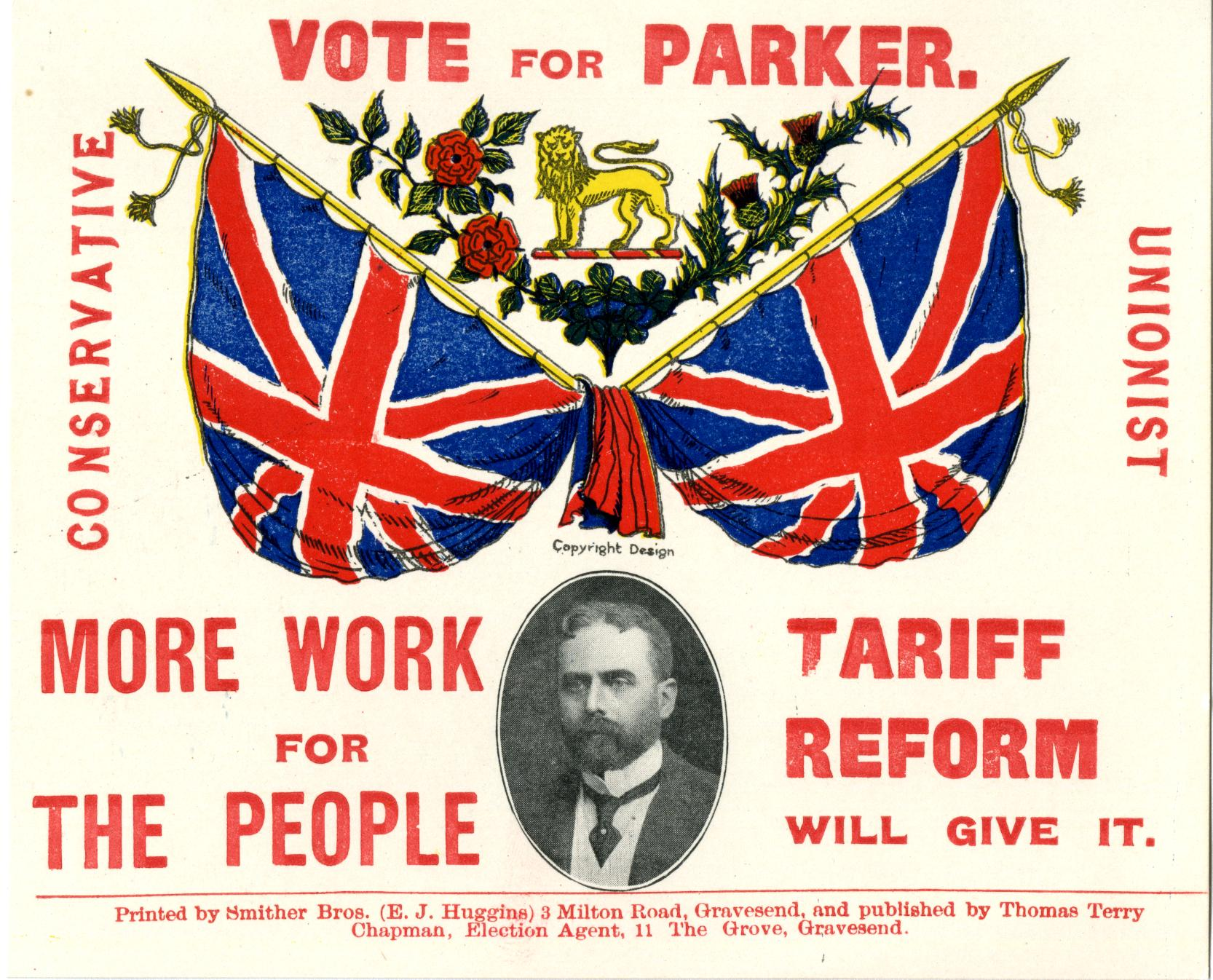
Vote for Gilbert Parker poster from roughly 1900, supporting Parker's campaign for Parliament

His Canadian connection and his experience in Australia and elsewhere had made him a strong Imperialist in politics, and from that time he began to devote himself in large measure to a political career. He still kept up his literary work, but some of the books last mentioned cannot compare with those by which he made his name. He was elected to the British House of Commons as a Conservative member for Gravesend in 1900 and remained MP until 1918.

He was knighted in the 1902 Coronation Honours for his service to Canadian literature, receiving the accolade from King Edward VII at Buckingham Palace on 24 October that year. In the succeeding years he continually strengthened his position in the party, particularly by his energetic work on behalf of Tariff Reform and Imperial Preference. During World War I he organized British publicity toward the United States. He was created a baronet on 21 June 1915 and appointed as a Privy Councillor in 1916.

Parker baronets of Carlton House Terrace
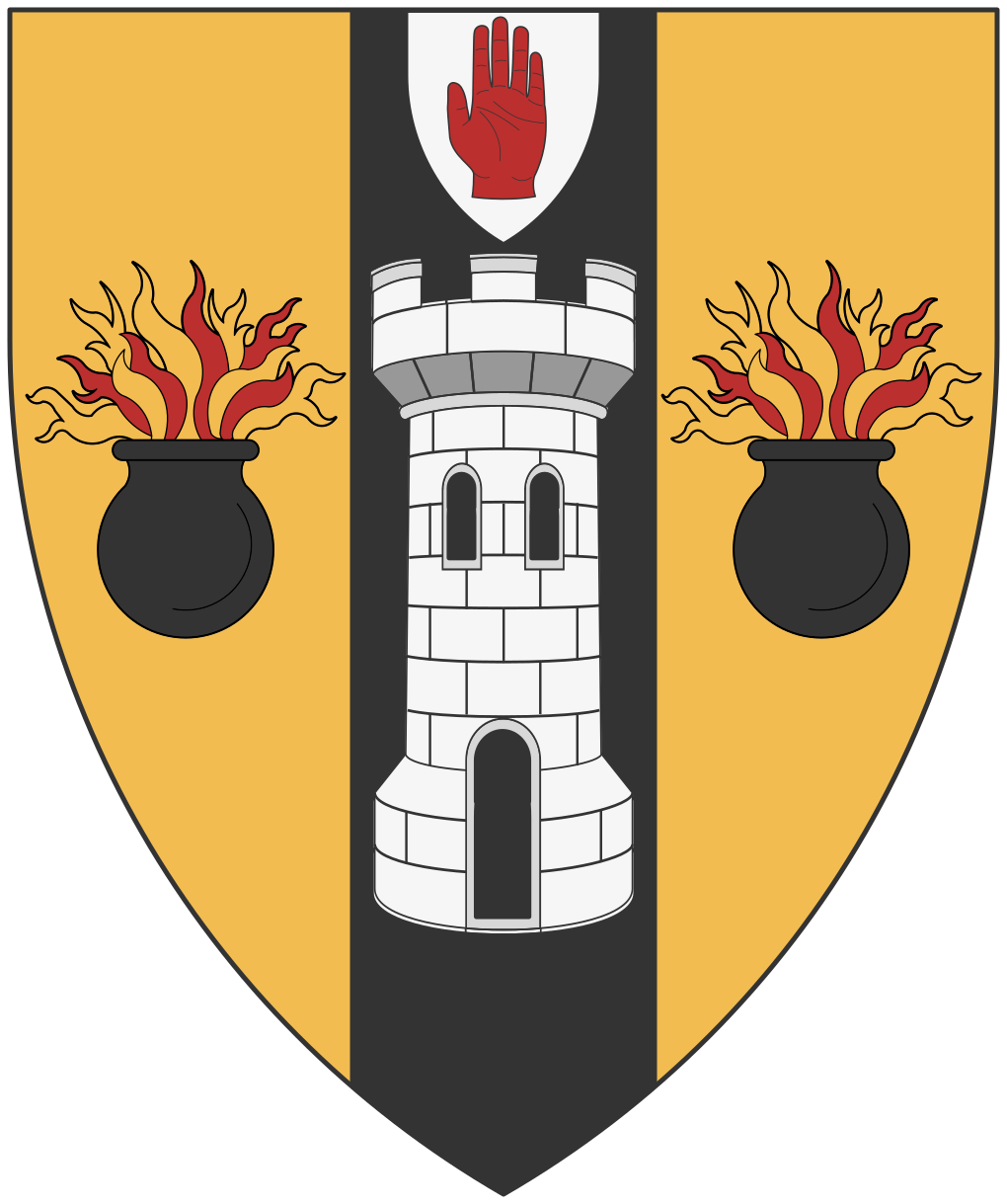
- Escutcheon of the Parker baronets of Carlton House Terrace
- Creation date: 1915
- Status: extinct
- Extinction date: 1932
- Motto: Alis volat propriis
- Arms: Or, on a pale sable between two grenades fired proper, a tower argent masoned of the second
- Crest: Upon a tower proper a grenade as in the arms.

In May 1905, Parker publicly claimed to have seen a "vision" of fellow house member, Frederic Carne Rasch, despite the fact that Rasch was known to be bedridden at home with influenza.

He died in London (England) on 6 September 1932 and on 26 September he was buried in Belleville, Ontario. One of the honorary pallbearers was then Prime Minister of Canada, Richard Bedford Bennett.

1900 Election, Gravesend
Candidate	Party	Votes	%
Gilbert Parker	Conservative Party	2,542	58.5
H.A. Harmsworth	Liberal Party	1,804	41.5

== World War I propagandist ==
The British put forth a large effort to find an able and persuasive writer to effectively communicate with the Americans during World War I. Parker played a crucial and significant role in that propaganda. On 2 September 1914, Parker was chosen by Charles Masterman and the British government to head the subdivision of Wellington House that was responsible for American propaganda. He was unpaid and had no formal title for this role. The goal was to convince America to support the British cause in the war. Parker was supplied with a "large propaganda office" to plan, write, and distribute the new technique of British propaganda.

His main objective was to create new relationships and hold onto existing ones with American citizens.

To do this, Gilbert showered the American people with writings from people such as Rudyard Kipling, H. G. Wells, John Galsworthy, Arnold Bennett, and George Bernard Shaw. His own writings, known as the "White Papers," were sent into the New York Times in 1914. The subheading of one article read, "A Modest Appeal from Sir Gilbert Parker to read the British Side."

His strategic marriage to Amy VanTine, his reputation as a writer, and his social status among the American people, allowed him to establish friendships with many influential Americans in all professions. Using his fame and character, Sir Gilbert Parker flattered the American press with eloquent words and compliments. He called the Americans "fighting people". He also said that "this war will prove them to have everything that they have always had—courage, swiftness if conception, capacity to perform, and a lightning-like directness." His writings essentially "educated" the one source that he knew would reach the majority of Americans. However, he didn't stop there: he continued to spread his "knowledge" by distributing "propaganda material" to American libraries, educational institutions, and periodicals. While focusing on professional establishments he continued to create personal relationships with American elites such as college professors, scientists, doctors, politicians, etc. His method of establishing personal relationships was a landmark later used in other methods of propaganda, "it was the complete and skillful technique later to be developed by many other propagandists, lobbyists, and public relations council."

=== Methods ===
He worked under the theory that the British cause could not be accomplished through "violent wooing," but must instead be efforts of "gentle and modest courtship." "Practically since the day war broke out I became responsible for American publicity" he wrote in Harper's Magazine after the US entered the war. "I need hardly say that the scope of my department was very extensive and its activities widely ranged. Among the activities was a weekly report to the British Cabinet on the state of American opinion, and constant touch with the permanent correspondents of American newspapers in England. I also frequently arranged for important public men in England to act for us by interviews in American newspapers; and among these distinguished people were Mr. Lloyd George (the present Prime Minister), Viscount Grey, Mr. Balfour, Mr. Bonar Law, the Archbishop of Canterbury, Sir Edward Carson, Lord Robert Cecil, Mr. Walter Runciman, (the Lord Chancellor), Mr. Austen Chamberlain, Lord Cromer, Will Crooks, Lord Curzon, Lord Gladstone, Lord Haldane, Mr. Henry James, Mr. John Redmond, Mr. Selfridge, Mr. Zangwill, Mrs. Humphry Ward, and fully a hundred others."

His office performed a long analysis of the American press and established a mailing list based on the American Who's Who which included 260,000 influential Americans as well as public libraries, Y.M.C.A.'s, Universities, Colleges, clubs, and newspapers. He sent propaganda literature generated by Wellington House to those on his mailing list, but the letters only carried Parker's name, never mentioning Wellington House or the British government. An example of one of his many letters is as follows:

Dear Sir,

I am well aware that American enterprise has made available reprints of the official papers relating to the present European war; but the original British prints of these publications may not be accessible to those persons of influence who would study them for a true history of the conflict. I am venturing to send to you under another cover several of these official documents. I am sure you will not consider this an impertinence, but will realize that Britishers are deeply anxious that their cause may be judged from authoritative evidence.

In common with the great majority of Americans, you have, no doubt, made up your mind as to what country should be held responsible for this tragedy, but these papers may be found useful for reference, and because they contain the incontrovertible facts, I feel that you will probably welcome them in this form.

My long and intimate association with the United States through my writings gives me confidence to approach you, and I trust you will not think me intrusive or misunderstand my motive.

With all respect,
I am,
Yours very truly,
Gilbert Parker

Each publication he sent had a personal letter enclosed in order to portray him as an English patriot performing his duty. His objective was to gain the trust of Americans by appearing friendly and honest. He wrote in a tone that suggested he was a supporter of the British cause, but desired to promote international understanding, and that he was open to hearing all viewpoints. This tactic convinced many Americans that their role in the war was important, and many sympathized with the British cause as a result of his efforts.

=== Outcome ===
Parker continued his propaganda efforts up until the year the United States entered the war, 1917. At the beginning of 1917, he visited the United States to meet with Americans he had been corresponding with. On 3 February 1917, President Woodrow Wilson made a speech during Parker's visit that severed diplomatic ties with Germany. The U.S. had almost declared war and Parker believed that he had fulfilled his responsibilities. Later that same day, he resigned from his position at Wellington House, due to failing health, he said.

All of Wellington House's activities were kept in complete secrecy. This increased the credibility of their publications, because they could not be traced back to any official sources. Parker's letters concealed their connection and origin with the British government, and his American contacts never realized they were being manipulated. Today his influence on the First World War and America's entry into it is often overlooked, even by seemingly comprehensive propaganda analysis.

== Filmography ==
- The House with the Tall Porch, directed by J. Searle Dawley (1912, short film, based on the short story The House with the Tall Porch)
- The Priest and the Man, directed by J. Searle Dawley (1913, short film, based on the short story The Going of the White Swan)
- The Superior Law, directed by Oscar A. C. Lund (1913, short film, based on the novel The Right of Way)
- The Translation of a Savage, directed by Walter Edwin (1913, short film, based on the novel The Translation of a Savage)
- The Rightful Heir, directed by J. Searle Dawley (1913, short film, based on the short story The Lane That Had No Turning)
- Pierre of the Plains (1914, based on the short story collection Pierre and His People)
- The Going of the White Swan, directed by Colin Campbell (1914, short film, based on the short story The Going of the White Swan)
- The Seats of the Mighty, directed by T. Hayes Hunter (1914, based on the novel The Seats of the Mighty)
- The Right of Way, directed by John W. Noble (1915, based on the novel The Right of Way)
- Jordan Is a Hard Road, directed by Allan Dwan (1915, based on the short story Jordan Is a Hard Road)
- The Judgment House, directed by J. Stuart Blackton (1917, based on the novel The Judgment House)
- The World for Sale, directed by J. Stuart Blackton (1918, based on the novel The World for Sale)
- Wild Youth, directed by George Melford (1918, based on the novel Wild Youth)
- Heart of the Wilds, directed by Marshall Neilan (1918, based on the short story She of the Triple Chevron)
- You Never Know Your Luck, directed by Frank Powell (1919, based on the novel You Never Know Your Luck)
- The Right of Way, directed by John Francis Dillon (1920, based on the novel The Right of Way)
- Behold My Wife!, directed by George Melford (1920, based on the novel The Translation of a Savage)
- A Wise Fool, directed by George Melford (1921, based on the novel The Money Master)
- The Lane That Had No Turning, directed by Victor Fleming (1922, based on the short story The Lane That Had No Turning)
- Over the Border, directed by Penrhyn Stanlaws (1922, based on the short story She of the Triple Chevron)
- The Lodge in the Wilderness, directed by Henry McCarthy (1926, based on the short story The Lodge in the Wilderness)
- The Right of Way, directed by Frank Lloyd (1931, based on the novel The Right of Way)
- Behold My Wife!, directed by Mitchell Leisen (1934, based on the novel The Translation of a Savage)
- Pierre of the Plains, directed by George B. Seitz (1942, based on the short story collection Pierre and His People)

== Notes ==
Parliament of the United Kingdom
Preceded by Viscount Sandon	Member of Parliament for Gravesend; 1900–1918	Succeeded by Sir Alexander Richardson
Baronetage of the United Kingdom
New title	Baronet (of Carlton House Terrace); 1915–1932	Extinct
