= Vive la France! =

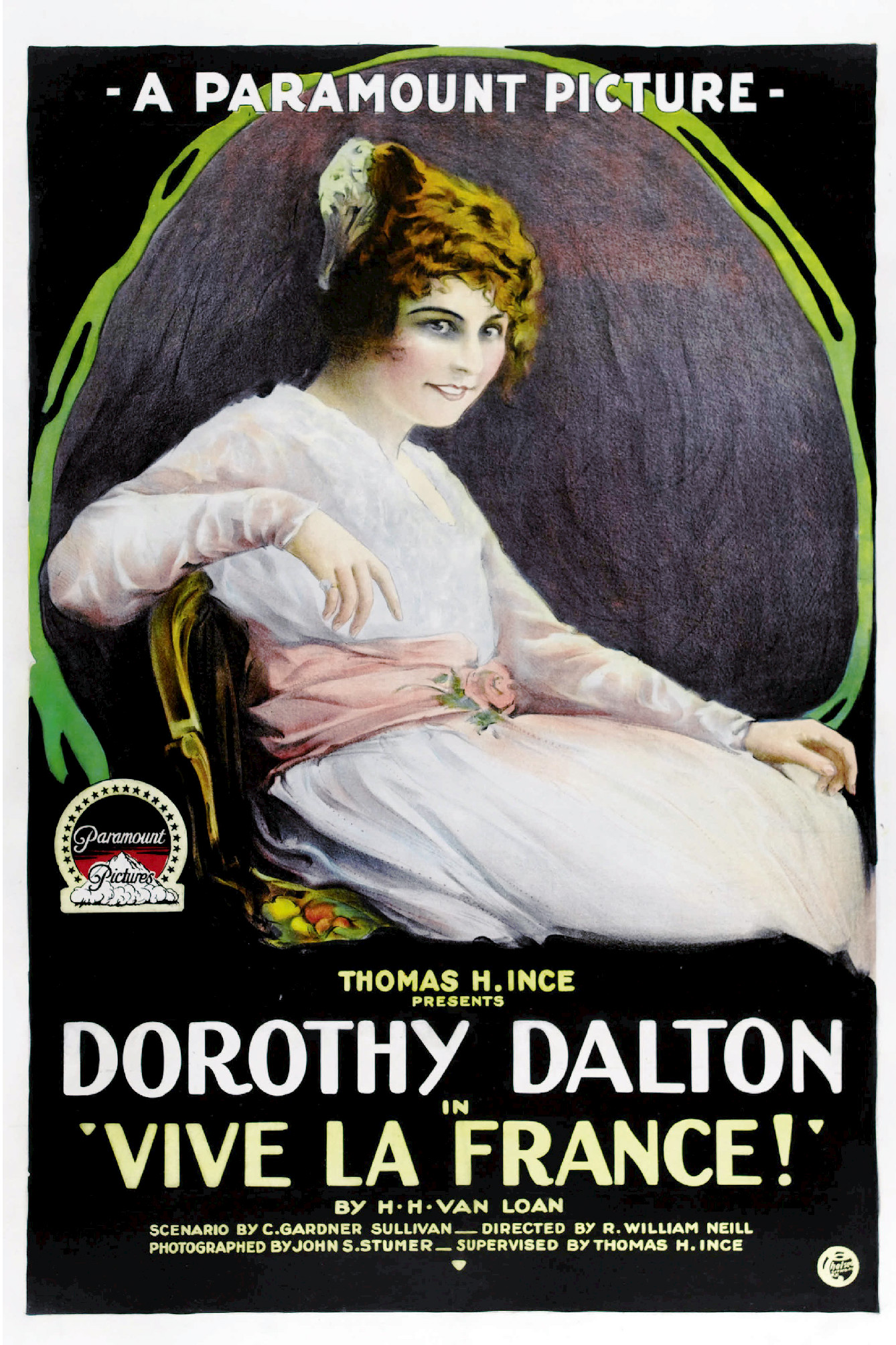
- Film poster
- Directed by: Roy William Neill
- Written by: C. Gardner Sullivan; H.H. Van Loan
- Produced by: Thomas H. Ince
- Starring: Dorothy Dalton; Edmund Lowe
- Cinematography: John S. Stumar; George Barnes
- Distributed by: Paramount Pictures
- Release date: September 15, 1918
- Running time: 5 reels
- Country: United States
- Language: Silent (English intertitles)

Vive la France! is an extant 1918 American silent war drama film directed by Roy William Neill and starring Dorothy Dalton. It was distributed by Famous Players–Lasky and Paramount Pictures.

== Plot ==
The plot of the film follows Genevieve Bouchette, who is a motion picture actress who hears that her parents were killed by the German troops back in Deschon, France. When she enters France, she finds that Germany has recaptured Deschon. Genevieve, while Germans were in the town, took care of her wounded brother. Who ended up dying after German soldiers shot at the windows. The lieutenant of the men who killed her brother tries to overpower her and get her to submit to them, but she doesn't submit to them. They told her that if she doesn’t comply, they will brand her with “the cross of shame”. This is what women who were brought back to German lines were branded with. She ends up fainting at the threat and wakes up with the cross branded on her chest.

In the film, we also have a volunteer for the French army who was once an actor under the same studio as Genevieve, Jean Picard. His job is to carry an important message to a section of the forces that are cut off from the main forces. However, by the time he reached Deschon, he had been wounded and fainted from blood loss. Geneiveve comes across him and helps him, and he wakes up from being unconscious. She helps him find a way out of Germany's hands so that he can be safe.

Later in the film, Genevieve wants to escape the Germans. So to do that, she gets a uniform from a dead Hun. However, Genevieve was then arrested and ordered to be killed because in the uniform she was wearing, there were maps made by a spy. However, because of the cross on her chest, she was let go because the officer realized it must have been a mistake.

Months later, Deschon is finally at peace again, and Jean returns. However, he isn't the same. He had lost his memories. Genevieve does her best to help restore his memories, but nothing seems to work. That was until Jean saw the cross of shame on her chest. It was then that he was able to remember things and get his memory back.

== Cast ==
- Dorothy Dalton as Genevieve Bouchette
- Edmund Lowe as Jean Picard
- Fred Starr as Captain Heinrich May
- Tom Guise as Colonel Bouchier
- Bert Woodruff as Pierre Le Gai
- Bert Sprotte as German Seargeant
- Eunice Woodruff

== Reception ==
Variety gave the film a positive review, praising the "masterly" handled production and the "excellent work" of the actors.

== Preservation status ==
A complete print of Vive la France! exists in a European archive, the Cinematheque Royale de Belgique, Brussels.
