= The Lane that Had No Turning, and Other Tales Concerning the People of Pontiac =

The Lane that Had No Turning, and Other Tales Concerning the People of Pontiac is a collection of short stories by Gilbert Parker, published in 1900 by Doubleday, Page & Co. and also that same year by Heinemann in London and by the Canadian publisher George N. Morang in Toronto. The first four stories in the collection (including the title story) had been published previously in The Illustrated London News. Parker dedicated the book to Canadian prime minister Sir Wilfrid Laurier, declaring his "sincere sympathy with French life and character, as exhibited in the democratic yet monarchial province of Quebec."

The book served as the basis for a silent film of the same title, released in 1922.

The following stories are included in the collection:

- The Lane that Had No Turning
- The Absurd Romance Of P’tite Louison
- The Little Bell Of Honour
- A Son of the Wilderness
- A Worker in Stone
- The Tragic Comedy of Annette
- The Marriage of the Miller
- Mathurin
- The Story of the Lime-Burner
- The Woodsman's Story of the Great White Chief
- Uncle Jim
- The House with the Tall Porch
- Parpon the Dwarf
- Times Were Hard in Pontiac
- Medallion's Whim
- The Prisoner
- An Upset Price
- A Fragment of Lives
- The Man that Died at Alma
- The Baron of Beaugard
- Parables of a Province
  - The Golden Pipes
  - The Guardian of the Fire
  - By That Place Called Peradventure
  - The Singing of the Bees
  - There Was a Little City
  - The Forge in the Valley

The final six pieces in the collection, the so-called "Parables of a Province," are different in tone from the other stories, had not been as well received upon magazine publication, and have not always been included in later reprints of the work.
