= The Seats of the Mighty =

1896 novel by Gilbert Parker

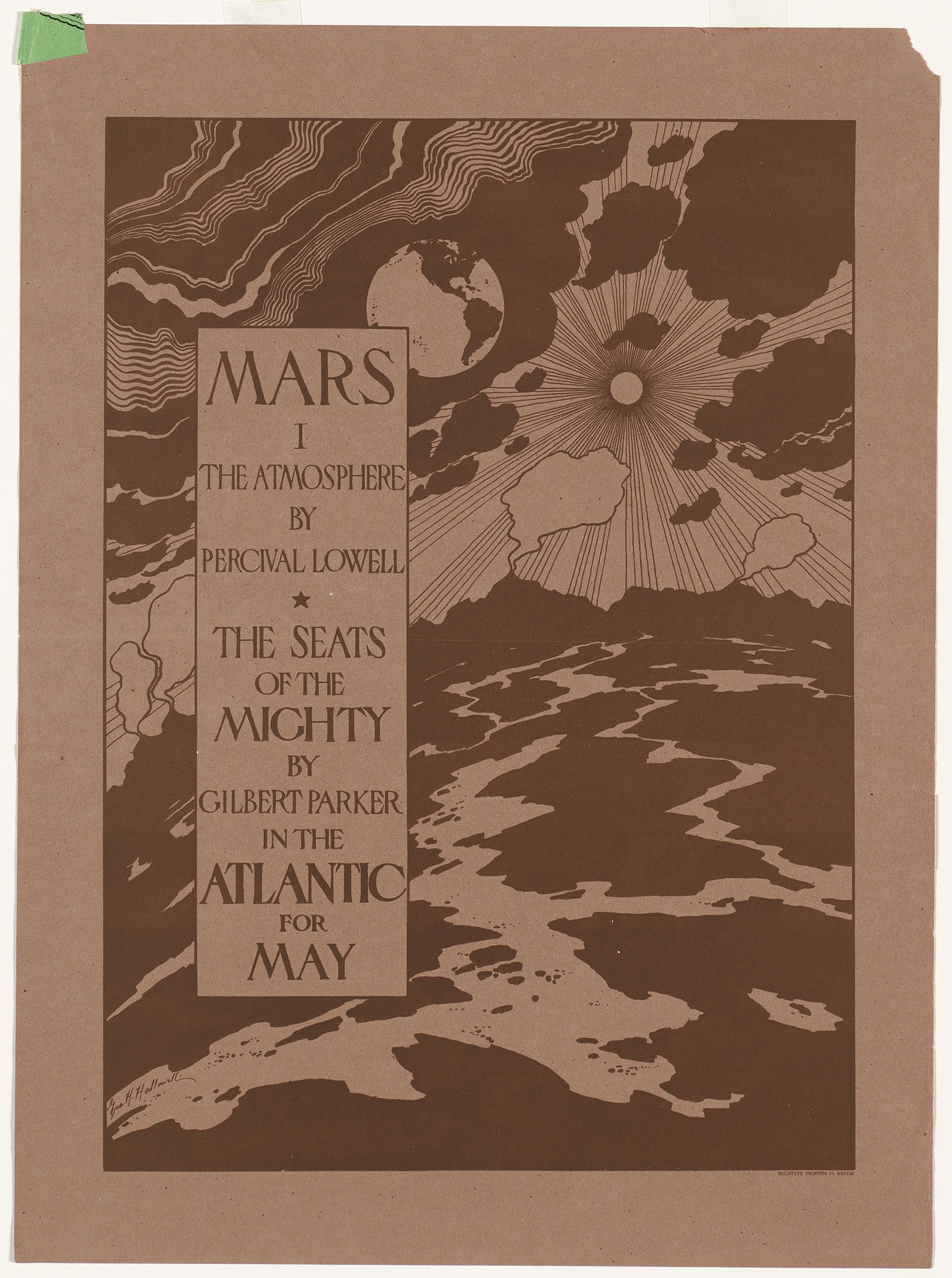
Poster promoting the first appearance of The Seats of the Mighty in The Atlantic Monthly (1895)

The Seats of the Mighty is a novel published in 1896 by Gilbert Parker. It was first published in serial form in The Atlantic starting in March 1895, and released in book form in 1896. It was the third highest best-selling book in the United States in 1896.

It is a historical novel depicting the English conquest of Quebec with James Wolfe and the Marquis de Montcalm as two of the characters.

It was adapted into a play by late 1896 and a silent film in 1914 starring Lionel Barrymore.
