= Wild Youth (film) =

1918 film by George Melford

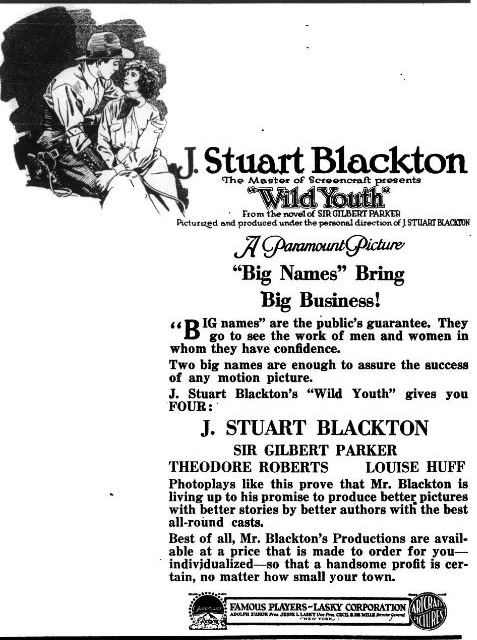
- Advertisement
- Directed by: George Melford
- Screenplay by: Beulah Marie Dix; Gilbert Parker
- Based on: Wild Youth by Gilbert Parker
- Produced by: J. Stuart Blackton
- Starring: Louise Huff; Theodore Roberts; Jack Mulhall; James Cruze; Adele Farrington
- Cinematography: Paul P. Perry
- Production company: Famous Players–Lasky Corporation
- Distributed by: Paramount Pictures
- Release date: March 18, 1918
- Running time: 50 minutes
- Country: United States
- Language: Silent (English intertitles)

Wild Youth is a lost 1918 American silent drama film directed by George Melford and written by Beulah Marie Dix. The film stars Louise Huff, Theodore Roberts, Jack Mulhall, James Cruze, and Adele Farrington. It is based on a novel by Gilbert Parker. The film was released on March 18, 1918, by Paramount Pictures. It is not known whether the film currently survives, which suggests that it is a lost film.

== Plot ==
Forced to marry the elderly and narrow-minded Joel Mazarine, Louise lives unhappy and mistreated until she meets the young Orlando. Her husband, jealous, sees love blossom between the two young when Orlando remains at his ranch to recover from a wound of the bullet. Louise remained in the woods because of a fall from her horse, she can not return home because Mazarine Orlando is on charges of kidnapping her. Orlando, who finds her, takes her back to the ranch but Mazarine was furious and beats his wife mercilessly. The woman is saved by the intervention of faithful Li Choo, his Chinese servant, who kills Mazarine.

Of the crime, he accused Orlando. The confession of Li Choo exonerates him. Louise and Orlando are now free to marry.

== Cast ==
- Louise Huff as Louise Mazarine
- Theodore Roberts as Joel Mazarine
- Jack Mulhall as Orlando Guise
- James Cruze as Li Choo
- Adele Farrington as Orlando's Mother
- Charles Ogle as Doctor

== Reception ==
Like many American films of the time, Wild Youth was subject to cuts by city and state film censorship boards. For example, the Chicago Board of Censors cut, in Reel 2, two shootings by outlaws.
