= The Lane That Had No Turning =

1922 film by Victor Fleming

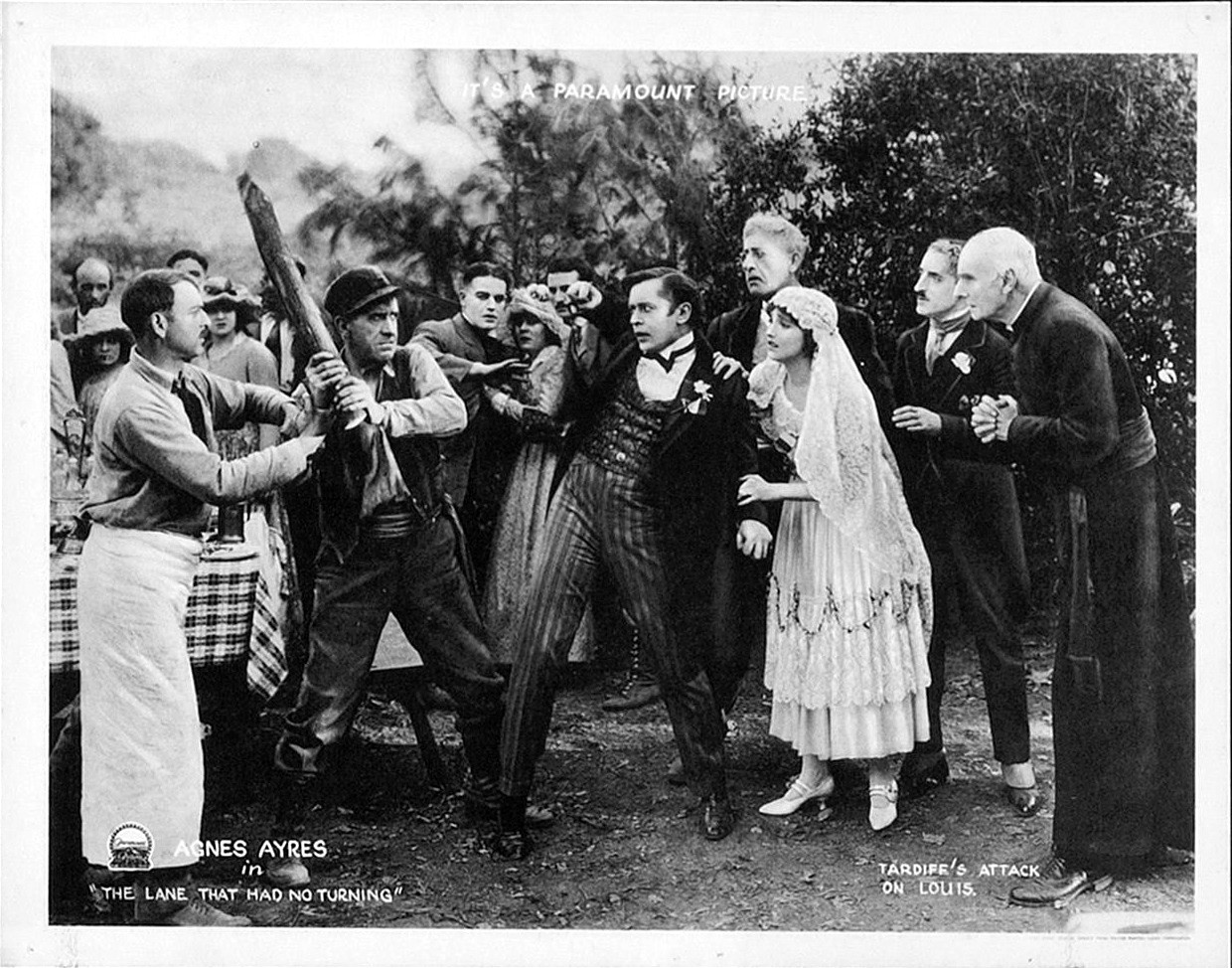
- Lobby card
- Directed by: Victor Fleming
- Written by: Eugene Mullin
- Based on: The Lane That Had No Turning by Gilbert Parker
- Produced by: Adolph Zukor; Jesse Lasky
- Starring: Agnes Ayres
- Cinematography: Gilbert Warrenton
- Distributed by: Paramount Pictures
- Release date: January 15, 1922
- Running time: 50 min., (5 reels at 4,892 feet)
- Country: United States
- Language: Silent (English intertitles)

The Lane That Had No Turning is a lost 1922 American silent drama film that was directed by Victor Fleming. It was produced by Famous Players–Lasky and released through Paramount Pictures. It is based on the short novel with the same title by Gilbert Parker, which is included as the title story of Parker's 1900 collection The Lane that Had No Turning, and Other Tales Concerning the People of Pontiac.

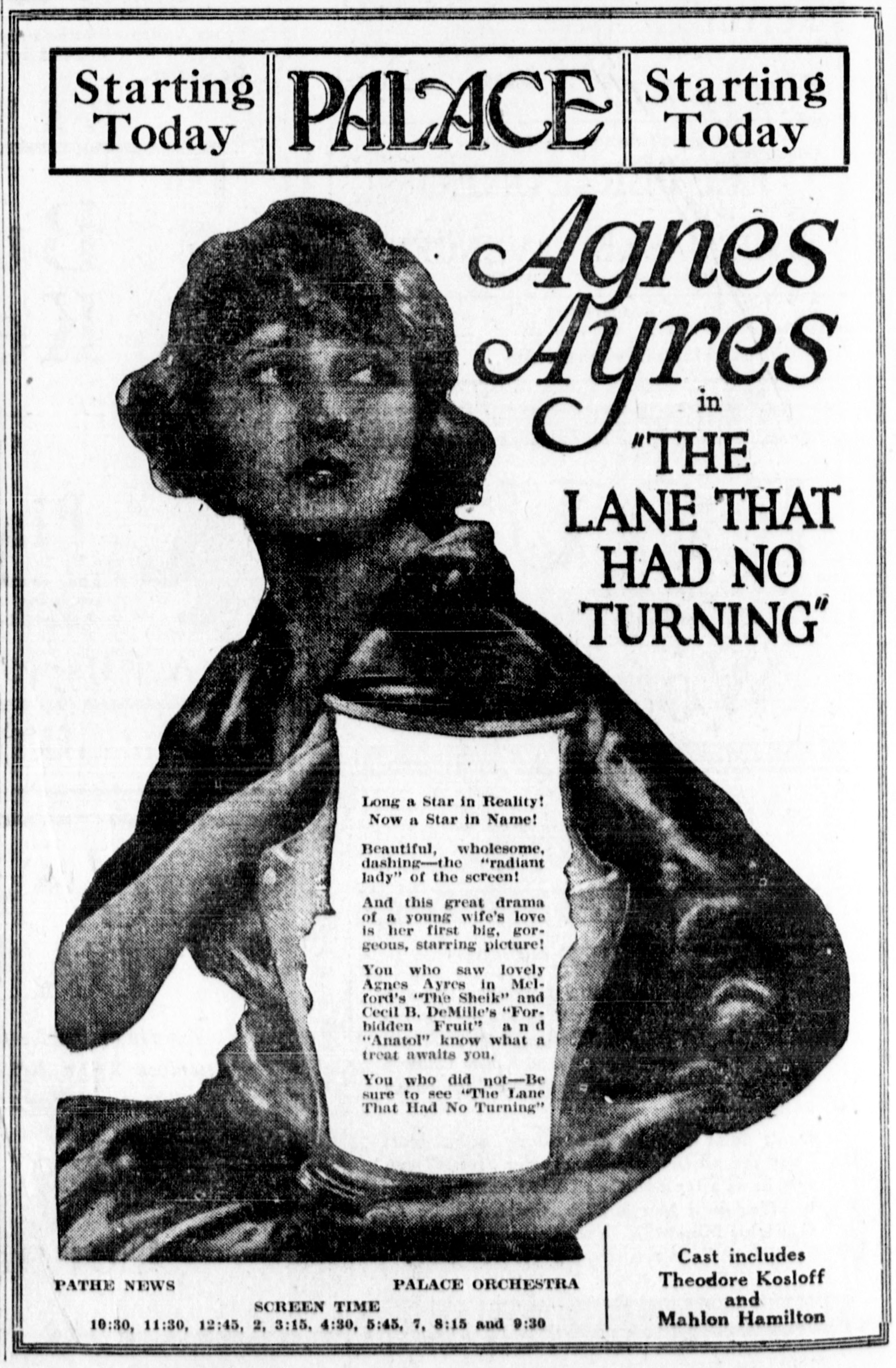
Newspaper advertisement

== Plot ==
As described in a film magazine, in the village of Pontiac, Madelinette has married Louis Racine. At the wedding announcement, since her father the former Seigneur of Pontiac died intestate and no will could be found, Madelinette is to receive $10,000 so she can continue her operatic studies. Tardiff, a former servant of the Seigneur, mocks Louis' new title and hints that a will is hidden somewhere and is certain to be found. Tardiff's interruption of the festivities results in a fight in which Louis is flung against a tree and injured. The injuries are such that Louis eventually becomes a hunchback, and he fears in his heart that his young and beautiful wife will turn from him when she returns from her operatic success in Europe. When Madelinette does return from her tour, she is horrified by the deformity on her unhappy husband's back, but decides to give up her career to be with him and keep him happy. She later discovers the lost will and, while hiding it again, is seen by Tardiff, who steals it and carries it to the real heir of the estate. On her plea, the real heir, Englishman George Fournel, destroys the document. Tardiff hastens to Louis and whispers malicious statements about his wife Madelinette and the Englishman. A double tragedy ensues when Louis kills Tardiff and then, to escape pursuers, takes his own life. Later, a romance springs up between Madelinette and George and they are married.

== Cast ==
- Agnes Ayres as Madelinette
- Theodore Kosloff as Louis Racine
- Mahlon Hamilton as George Fournel
- Wilton Taylor as Joe Lajeunesse
- Frank Campeau as Tardiff
- Lillian Leighton as Marie
- Charles West as Havel
- Robert Bolder as Monsieur Poire
- Fred Vroom as the Governor General (credited as Frederick Vroom)
