= Moran of the Lady Letty =

1922 film by George Melford

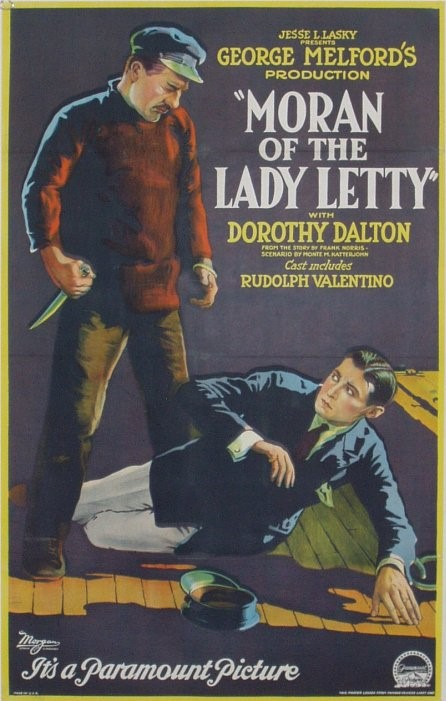
- Poster
- Directed by: George Melford
- Written by: Monte Katterjohn (adaptation)
- Based on: Moran of the Lady Letty by Frank Norris
- Produced by: Adolph Zukor; Jesse Lasky
- Starring: Dorothy Dalton; Rudolph Valentino
- Cinematography: William Marshall
- Music by: Robert Israel (2006 version)
- Production company: Famous Players–Lasky
- Distributed by: Paramount Pictures
- Release date: February 12, 1922
- Running time: 68 mins. (2006 alternate version)
- Country: United States
- Language: Silent (English intertitles)

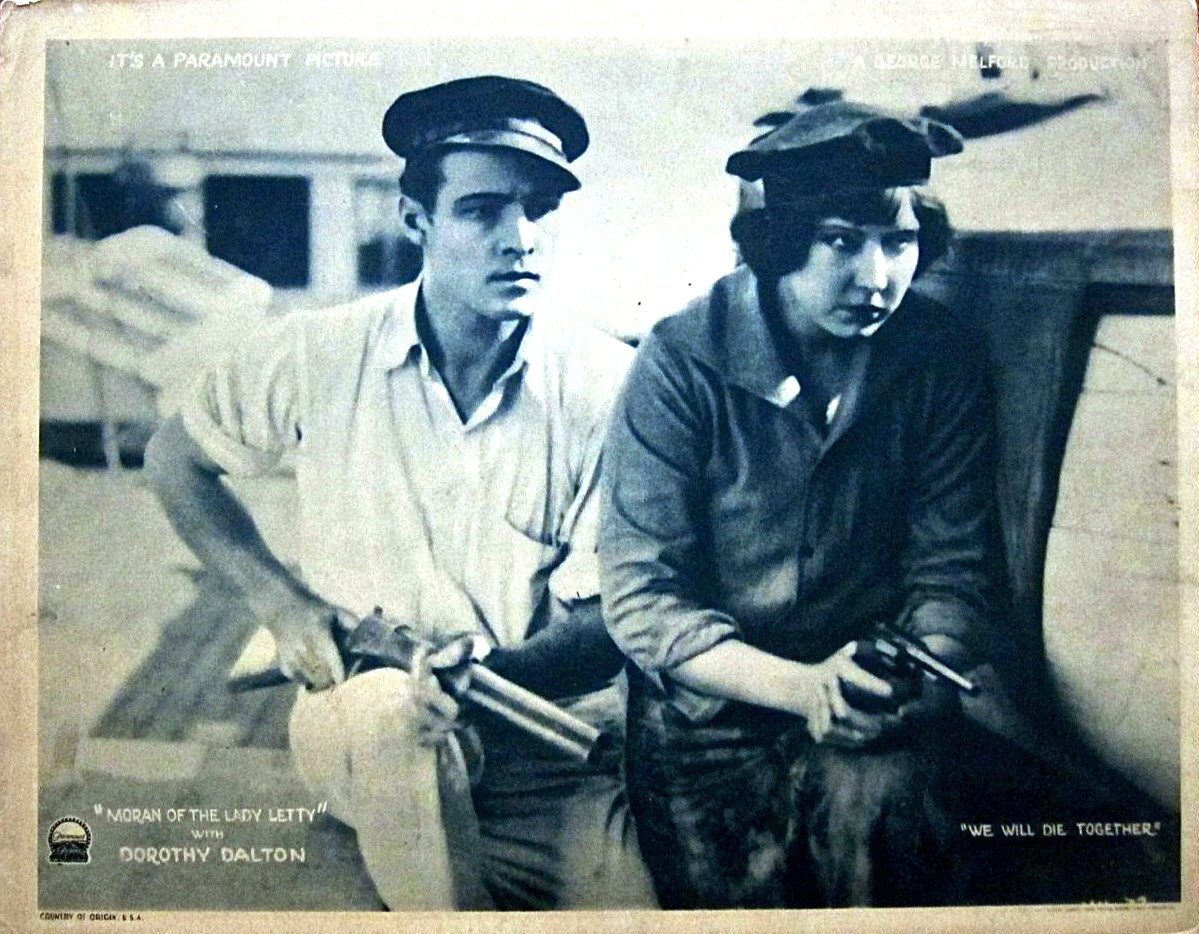
Lobby card

Moran of the Lady Letty is a 1922 American silent adventure drama film directed by George Melford and stars Rudolph Valentino and Dorothy Dalton. Melford and Valentino had previously worked together on the box office hit The Sheik, in 1921. The film is based on the novel of the same name by Frank Norris and was adapted for the screen by Monte Katterjohn.

== Plot ==
Moran of the Lady Letty (1922)

The opening scenes are set in Scandinavia, where a ship's captain and his daughter, Moran, are introduced. Moran, it is clear, adores her father. She has grown up on and around ships and can handle herself on the water as well as any man.

Then scene then shifts to San Francisco, where a young socialite, Ramon Laredo, complains that he is tired of the same tiresome round of parties and dances. He wishes he could get away from it all. While on his way to a yachting party, he meets up with an old sailor. After talking, they repair to a saloon, where Ramon is served a Mickey Finn. After passing out, he is shanghaied aboard a nefarious pirating ship, the "Heart of China," run by Captain Kitchell, a man without principles. Though initially dismissed as a pampered weakling by the crew and captain, Ramon proves his manhood and gradually gains everyone's respect.

A Scandinavian ship in distress is spotted off the bow; the pirate crew quickly move in to loot the burning ship. Most of the crew, they discover, is dead, victims of leaking coal gas. Ramon rescues one sailor, whom he carries back to the pirate ship, only to discover that "he" is a "she." It is Moran, of course, whose father has perished aboard the burning ship. Efforts to hide her identify are futile; when Captain Kitchell discovers a female is on board, it is clear that the woman's virginity is endangered. Ramon, however, is determined to protect her. Gradually, Ramon and Moran fall in love, though Moran insists at first that she has no interest in romance—she should have been born a boy, she says. After a lively battle on board the ship—crew vs. captain and his henchmen—the ship reaches the port in San Diego.

Disembarking, Ramon finds himself at a high-society party attended by vacationing San Franciscans. They are delighted to see him and urge him to rejoin their company. But Ramon makes it clear that his experience of recent months has changed him, has made him a better man. Confidently, happily, he returns to the ship and to Moran's waiting arms.

== Production, characters ==
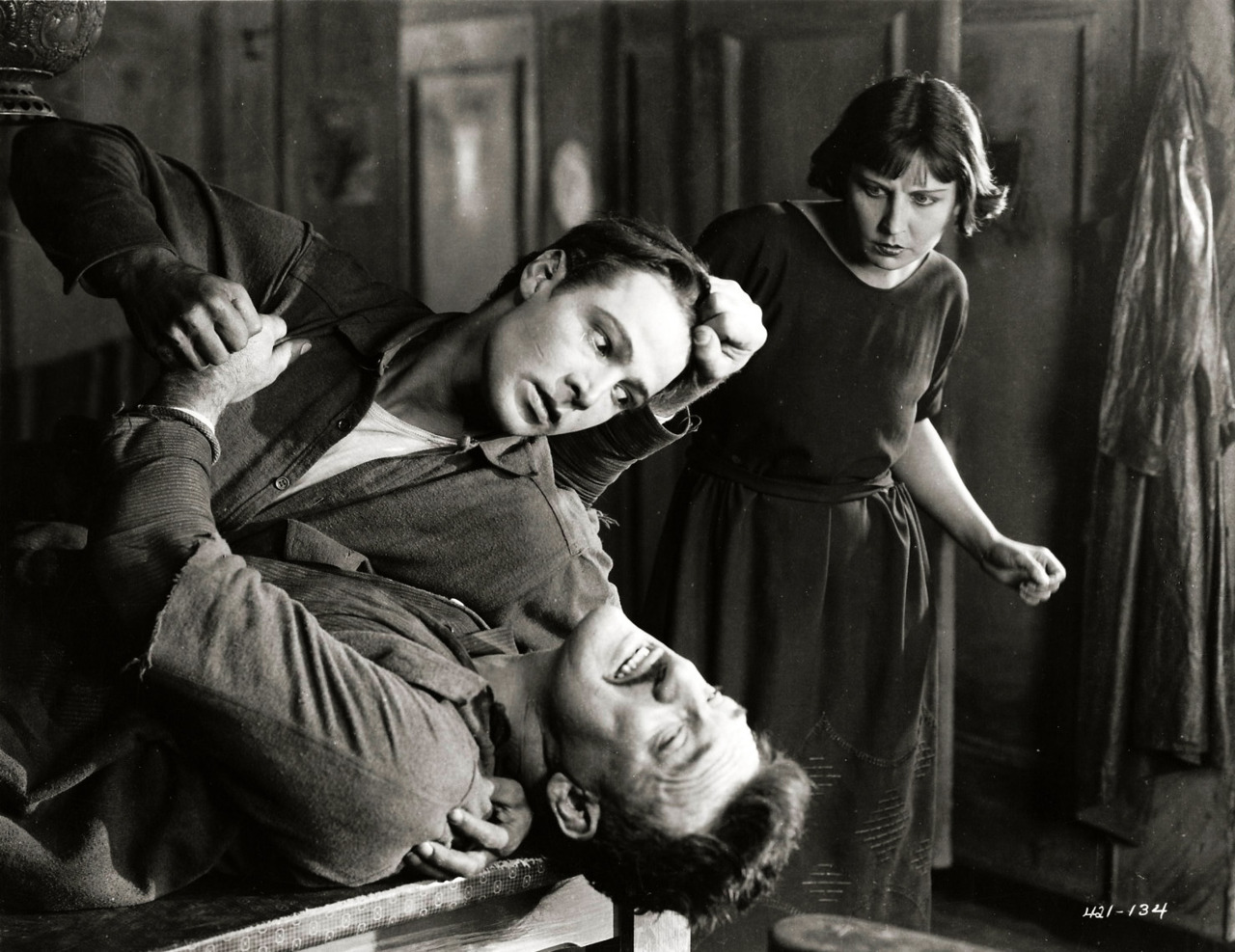
Rudolph Valentino, Walter Long and Dorothy Dalton in a scene from the film.

On the heels of The Four Horsemen and The Sheik, Moran was another vehicle to portray a strong, masculine character, here a San Francisco playboy who is transformed into a "masculine, sun-burned sailor". In the climax of the movie, Valentino fights the villain (played by Walter Long, whom Valentino had earlier dealt with in The Sheik) in the ship's rigging. Though the female love interest, Moran, tells him initially that she is "not made for men", they do kiss in a happy ending. As did Laredo, so does Moran's character change—from an independent, sexually ambiguous person to a "more feminine, definitely heterosexual woman at peace with her estrogen". The choice of Dorothy Dalton was criticized in a review in Variety. The film was described in April 1922's edition of Photoplay as "More or less pure hoakum that you’re almost ashamed of yourself for enjoying. Whether it is the presence of two sparklers such as Valentino and Dorothy Dalton, or whether it is the original power of the Frank Norris novel, we don’t know; but it’s good strong entertainment. Sea stuff; fights; love. Rodolph as usual; Dorothy with bobbed hair—yum yum!. You’re bound to like it."

== Cast ==
- Dorothy Dalton - Moran Letty Sternersen
- Charles Brinley - Capt. Eilert Sternersen
- Emil Jorgenson - Nels Larsen
- Rudolph Valentino - Ramon Laredo
- Maude Wayne - Josephine Herrick
- Walter Long - Capt. 'Slippery' Kitchell
- George Kuwa - 'Chopstick' Charlie
- Cecil Holland - Pancho
- William Boyd - Ramon's Friend at Homecoming (uncredited)
- Charles K. French - Tavern Owner (uncredited)
- George O'Brien - Deck Hand (uncredited)
- Charles Stevens - Seaman (uncredited)

== Production notes ==
Parts of the film were shot on location in San Francisco.

== Home media ==
Moran of the Lady Letty was released on DVD by Flicker Alley in 2007.
