= Jane Grey (actress) =

American actress (1882–1944)

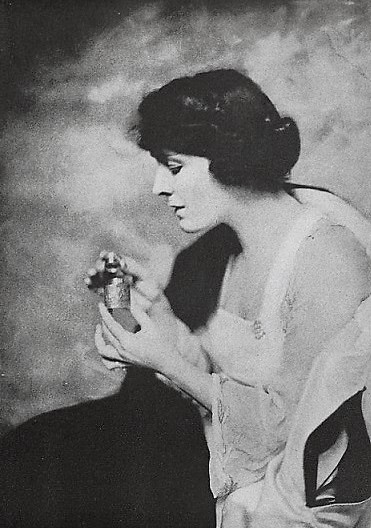
- Grey in 1918
- Born: May 22, 1882; Vermont, US
- Died: November 9, 1944 (aged 61)
- Other names: Gladys Grey; Mamie Larock
- Occupation: Actress
- Years active: 1909–1935
- Spouses: Ricardo Martin; William E. Tyrrel
- Children: 2

Jane Grey (born Mamie Larock; May 22, 1882 – November 9, 1944) was an American stage and screen actress of the silent era.

== Early life ==
Born in Vermont in 1882, Mamie (later Jane Grey) was the fifth child of seven children of Louisa May and Joseph Larock. The federal census of 1900 documents that her father, a native of Canada, was a "common day laborer" and that her Vermont-born mother washed other people's clothes to earn extra money to support the large family.

== Stage and film ==
Grey started her Broadway career around 1911 and was the original female lead with John Barrymore in the popular 1914 stage play Kick In written by Willard Mack . Grey, who began appearing in films around 1913, was in Hassard Short's All-Star Shakespearean pageant for Actor's Equity in 1921, and she was also cast in a few French productions for Louis Feuillade in the early 1920s.

In 1911, and again in 1914, Grey was a member of the Summer Stock cast at Elitch Theatre in Denver, Colorado. "The leading woman was Jane Grey. Miss Grey was an Anglo-Australian actress whom Charles Frohman brought to the United States and who had just completed a ten-month run in the New York engagement of David Belasco's play, The Concert."

== Personal life and death ==
Grey was married twice, to Ricardo Martin and then to William E. Tyrrel.

== Filmography ==
- The Paymaster's Son (1913) *short
- The Adventures of a Girl Reporter (1914) *short
- The Little Gray Lady (1914)
- The Flaming Sword (1915)
- The Right of Way (1915)
- Let Katie Do It (1916)
- Man and His Angel (1916)
- The Waifs (1916)
- The Test (1916)
- The Flower of Faith (1916)
- Her Fighting Chance (1917)
- The Guilty Wife (1918)
- The Birth of a Race (1918)
- When My Ship Comes In (1919)
- The Inner Ring (1919) *short
- Le droit de tuer (1920)
- L'orpheline (1921)
- Parisette (1921)
- The Governor's Lady (1923)
- The Love Wager (1927)
