= The Spider (1916 film) =

1916 silent drama film directed by Robert G. Vignola

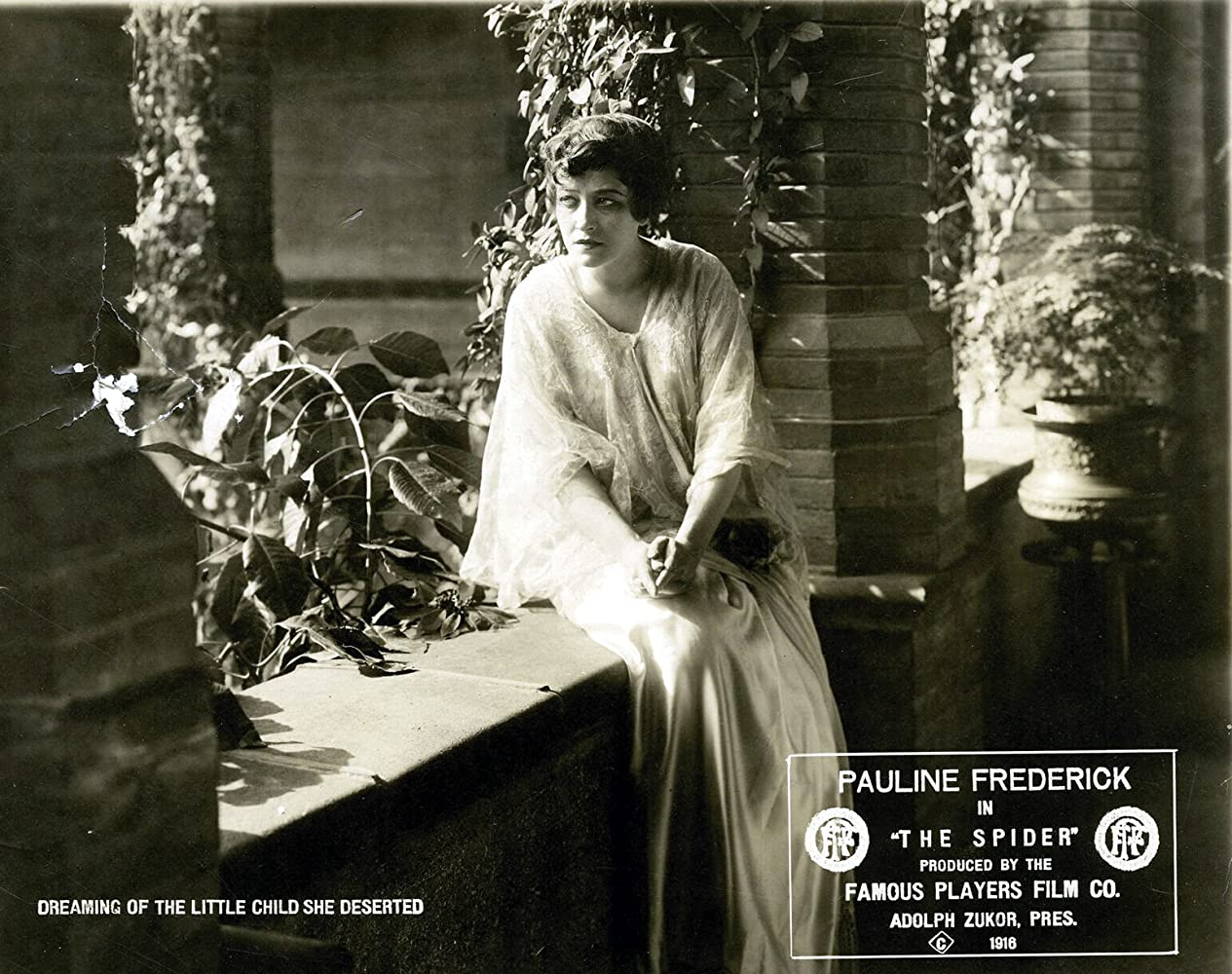
- Lobby card
- Directed by: Robert G. Vignola
- Screenplay by: William Clifford
- Produced by: Daniel Frohman
- Starring: Pauline Frederick; Thomas Holding; Frank Losee
- Production company: Famous Players Film Company
- Distributed by: Paramount Pictures
- Release date: January 27, 1916
- Country: United States
- Language: Silent (English intertitles)

The Spider is a 1916 American silent drama film directed by Robert G. Vignola, written by William Clifford, and starring Pauline Frederick, Thomas Holding and Frank Losee. It was released on January 27, 1916, by Paramount Pictures.

== Plot ==
A French woman abandons her husband and child. Years later the child and mother both fall in love with the same artist, even though they don't know who each other are.

== Cast ==
- Pauline Frederick as Valerie St. Cyr / Joan Marche
- Thomas Holding as Julian St. Saens
- Frank Losee as Count Du Poissy

== Preservation ==
The Spider is currently presumed lost. In February of 2021, the film was cited by the National Film Preservation Board on their Lost U.S. Silent Feature Films list.
