= Thomas Holding =

British actor (1880–1929)

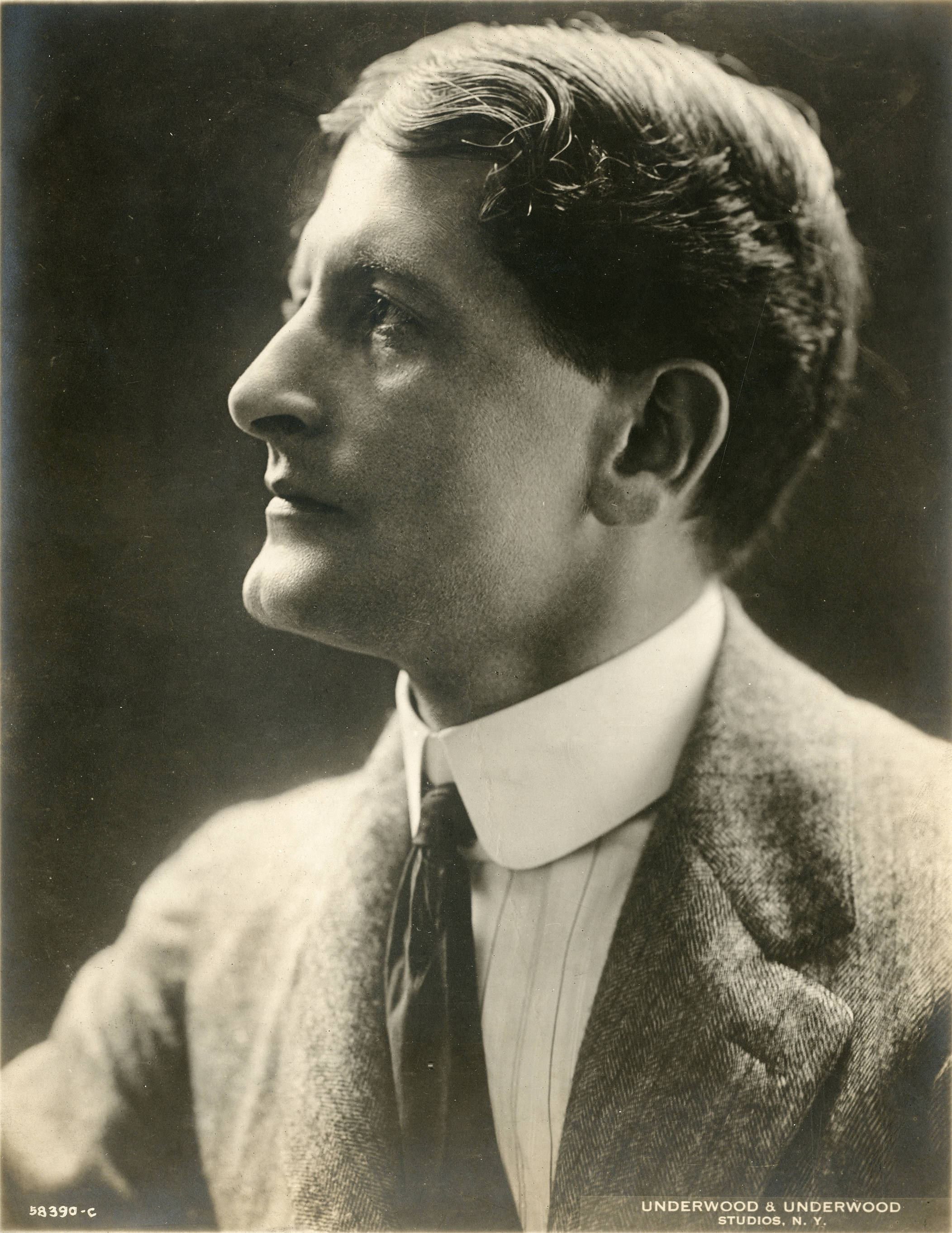
- Holding in 1919
- Born: Thomas J. Holding; 25 January 1880; Blackheath, Kent, England
- Died: 4 May 1929 (aged 49); New York City, U.S
- Other name: "The Costume Man"
- Occupation: Actor
- Years active: 1914–1929

Thomas J. Holding (25 January 1880 – 4 May 1929) was a British-born stage and film actor.

== Biography ==
Born in England in 1880, Holding possibly had an extensive stage career in his native Britain before arriving in the United States. He was popular in American silent films during the World War I years. His first films were in several features starring the actress Pauline Frederick. Holding died in 1929 of a heart attack in his dressing room while acting on Broadway according to Variety of 8 May 1929.

== Partial filmography ==
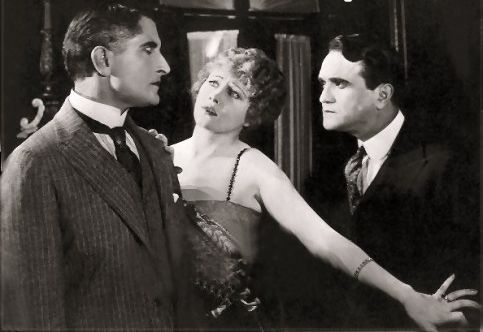
Thomas Holding, Anna Q. Nilsson, and Franklyn Farnum in The Vanity Pool (1918).

- The Eternal City (1915)
- Sold (1915)
- The White Pearl (1915)
- Bella Donna (1915)
- Lydia Gilmore (1915)
- The Spider (1916)
- The Moment Before (1916)
- Silks and Satins (1916)
- Redeeming Love (1916)
- The Great White Trail (1917)
- Her Fighting Chance (1917)
- Magda (1917)
- Daughter of Destiny (1917)
- The Dream Lady (1918)
- The Vanity Pool (1918)
- The Lady of Red Butte (1919)
- One Week of Life (1919)
- The Peace of Roaring River (1919)
- Beckoning Roads (1919)
- Her Kingdom of Dreams (1919)
- The Lone Wolf's Daughter (1919)
- A Woman Who Understood (1920)
- The Honey Bee (1920)
- The Woman in His House (1920)
- Sacred and Profane Love (1921)
- Without Benefit of Clergy (1921)
- The Lure of Jade (1921)
- The Three Musketeers (1921)
- Rose o' the Sea (1922)
- The Strangers' Banquet (1922)
- The Trouper (1922)
- Ruggles of Red Gap (1923)
- The Courtship of Miles Standish (1923)
- The White Monkey (1925)
- One Way Street (1925)
- The Reckless Lady (1926)
- The Untamed Lady (1926)
- The Nest (1927)
- Satan and the Woman (1928)
