= The Paymaster's Son =

- Directed by: Francis Ford
- Written by: C. Gardner Sullivan
- Produced by: Thomas H. Ince
- Starring: Robert Edeson
- Production company: Kay-Bee Pictures
- Distributed by: Mutual Film
- Release date: January 10, 1913
- Running time: 2 reels
- Country: USA
- Language: Silent..English

The Paymaster's Son is a surviving 1913 silent short drama film directed by Francis Ford and produced by Thomas H. Ince.

== Cast ==
- Robert Edeson - John Burton, The Paymaster's Son
- Charles K. French - Silas Burton, The Paymaster
- Robert Stanton - Colonel Randall
- Ann Little - Ethel Burton, The Paymaster's Daughter (*Anna Little)
- J. Barney Sherry - Richard Randall, Colonel's son
- Jane Grey -
- Nick Cogley -
- Charles Edler -
