= Dorothy Dalton =

American actress

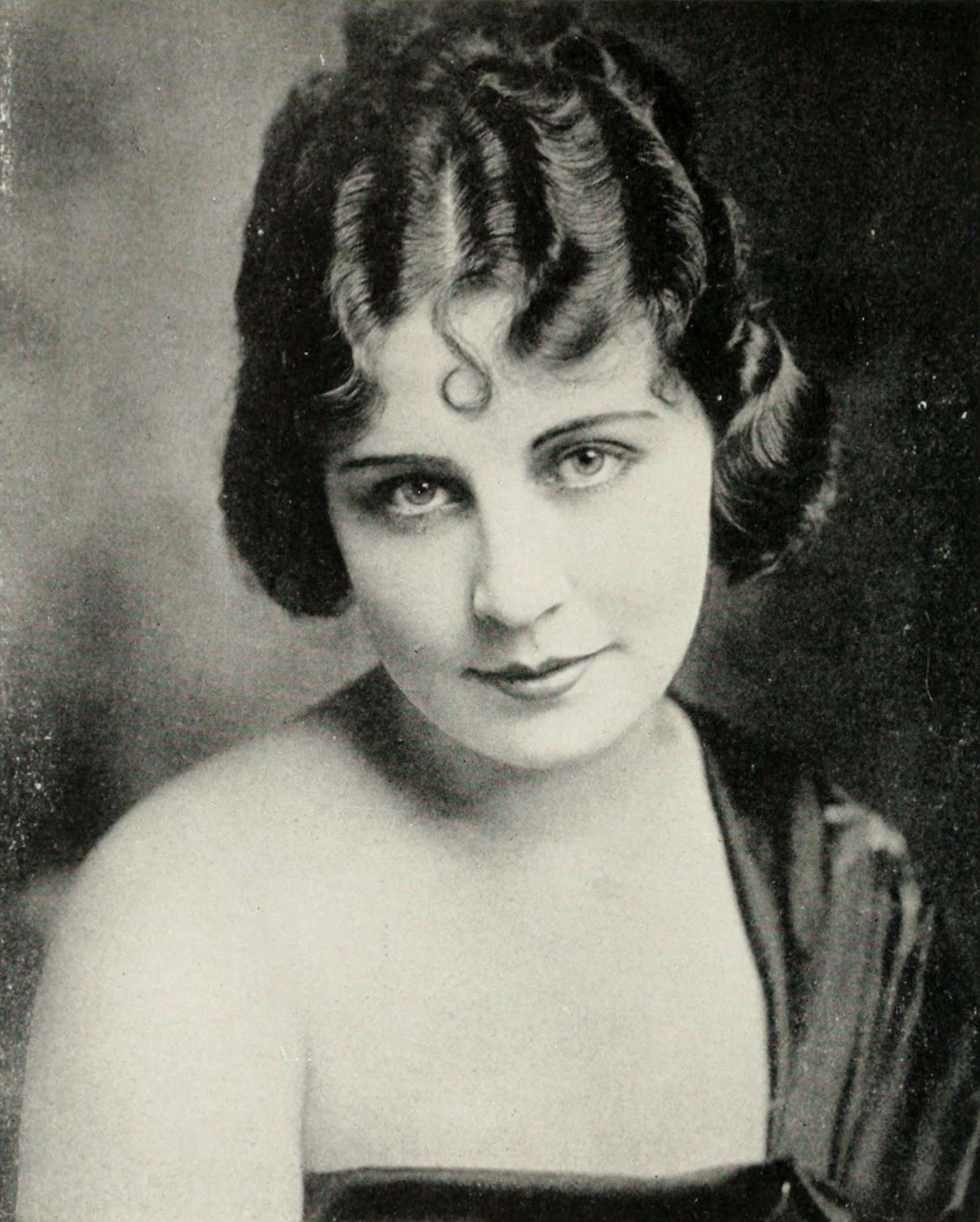
- Dalton in 1920
- Born: September 22, 1893; Chicago, Illinois, U.S.
- Died: April 13, 1972 (aged 78); Scarsdale, New York, U.S.
- Occupation: Actress
- Years active: 1910–1924
- Spouses: Lew Cody (m. 1913; div. 1914) 1914 (divorced) Arthur Hammerstein (m. 1924; died 1955)
- Relatives: Elaine Hammerstein (stepdaughter)

Dorothy Dalton (September 22, 1893 – April 13, 1972) was an American silent film actress and stage personality who worked her way from a stock company to a movie career. Beginning in 1910, Dalton was a player in stock companies in Chicago; Terre Haute, Indiana; and Holyoke, Massachusetts. She joined the Keith-Albee-Orpheum Corporation vaudeville circuits. By 1914 she was working in Hollywood.

== Career ==
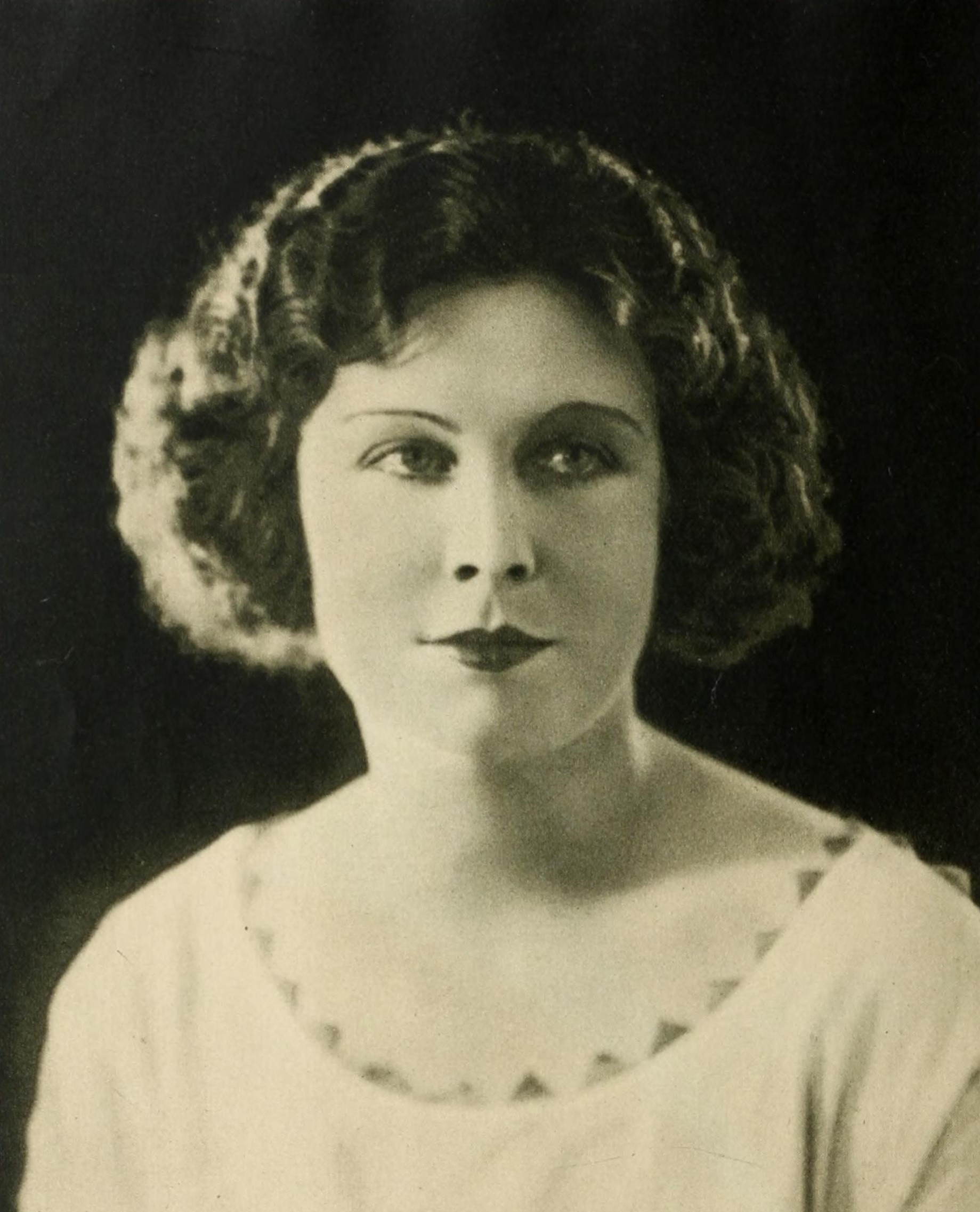
Dalton in 1924. In 1922, she had bobbed her hair.

Born in Chicago, Dalton made her movie debut in 1914 in Pierre of the Plains, co-starring Edgar Selwyn, followed by the lead role in Across the Pacific that same year. In 1915, she appeared with William S. Hart in The Disciple. This production came before she left Triangle Film Corporation and was signed to Thomas Harper Ince Studios. While Ince meant to cast her in mature roles, she had preferred to play ingénues.

Her role in The Disciple, however, in which she attracts a man who is not her husband, led to her being cast as a vamp. Her vamp, however, was untraditional in that she vamped unconsciously; in the words of Kay Anthony, "Not because she wanted people to think she was a full-fledged shatterer of hearts before the camera did she make pulses beat hard and fast, but because she couldn't help it: 'I guess I just must have been born that way!'"

Ince's company was operative from 1919 until his death in 1924. With Ince, she played in The Price Mark and Love Letters, both co-starring William Conklin. Dalton also performed with Rudolph Valentino in Moran of the Lady Letty (1922), and with H.B. Warner in The Flame of the Yukon (1917) and The Vagabond Prince (1916). Dalton's stage career included performances as Chrysis in Aphrodite by Morris Gest in 1920.

== Personal life and death ==
Dalton was first married to actor Lew Cody (lead actor in the Broadway version of Pierre of the Plains) in 1913, divorcing him then remarrying him in 1914 and divorcing him again. In 1924 she married theatrical producer Arthur Hammerstein, uncle of lyricist Oscar Hammerstein II and son of impresario Oscar Hammerstein I. They had a daughter, Carol Hammerstein. After this marriage, Dalton retired. Arthur Hammerstein died in 1955.

Dorothy Dalton died in 1972, age 78, at her home in Scarsdale, New York. For her contribution to the motion picture industry, Dorothy Dalton has a star on the Hollywood Walk of Fame at 1560 Vine Street.

== Filmography ==
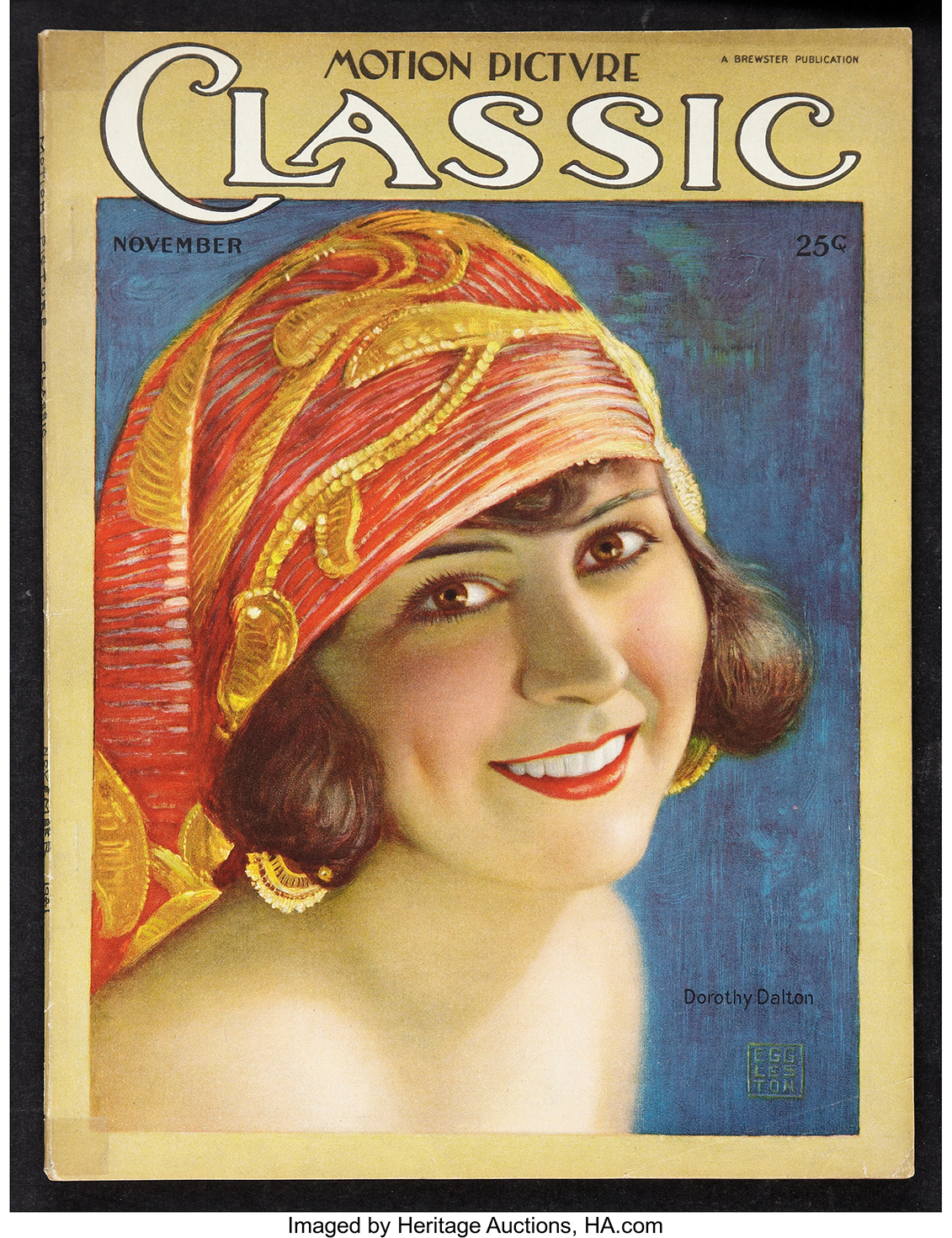
Dalton on the cover of Motion Picture Classic, November 1921, cover art by Benjamin Eggleston (1867-1937).

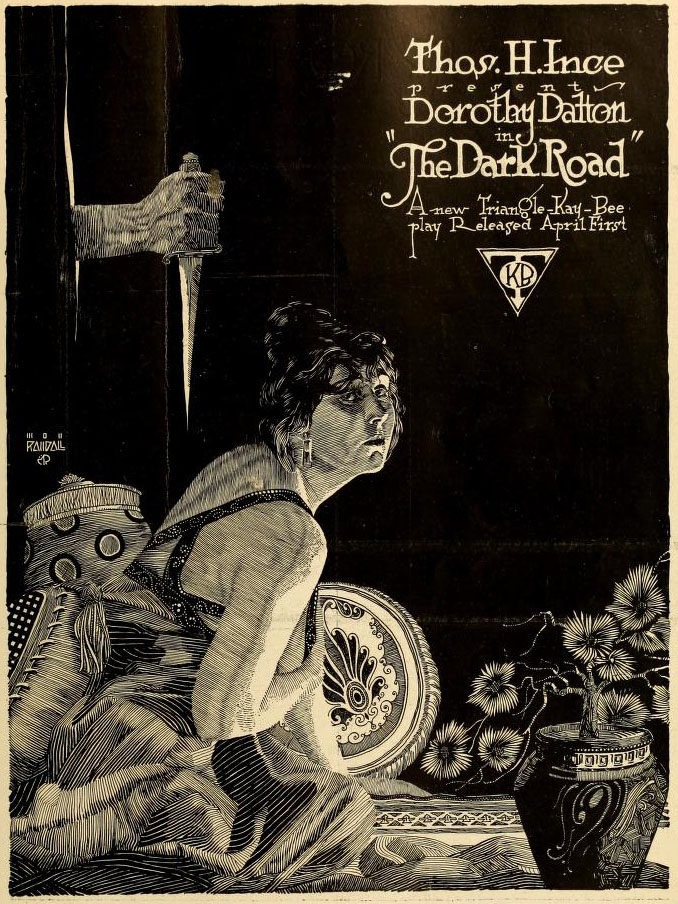
The Dark Road (1917)

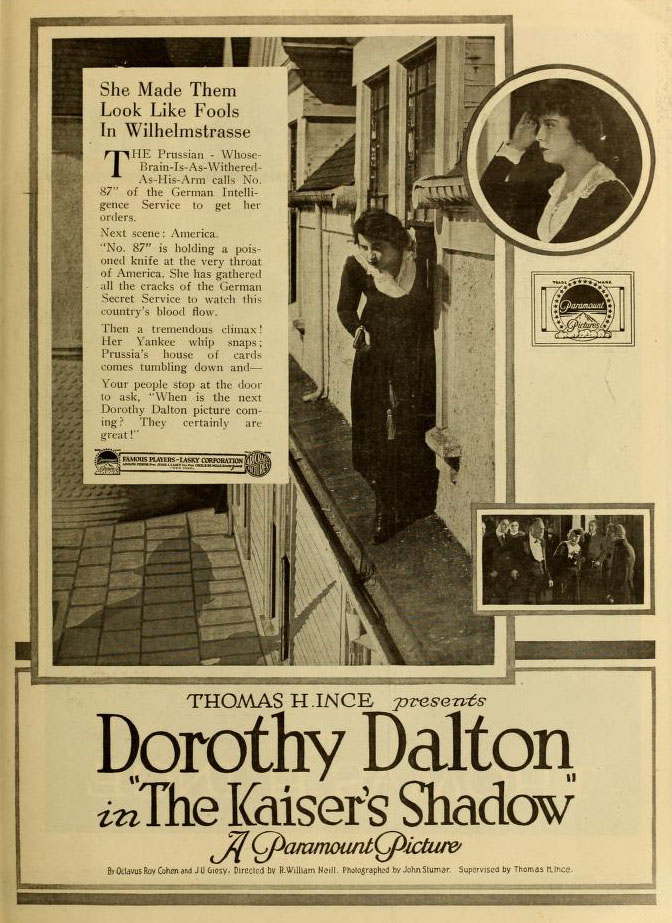
The Kaiser's Shadow (1918)

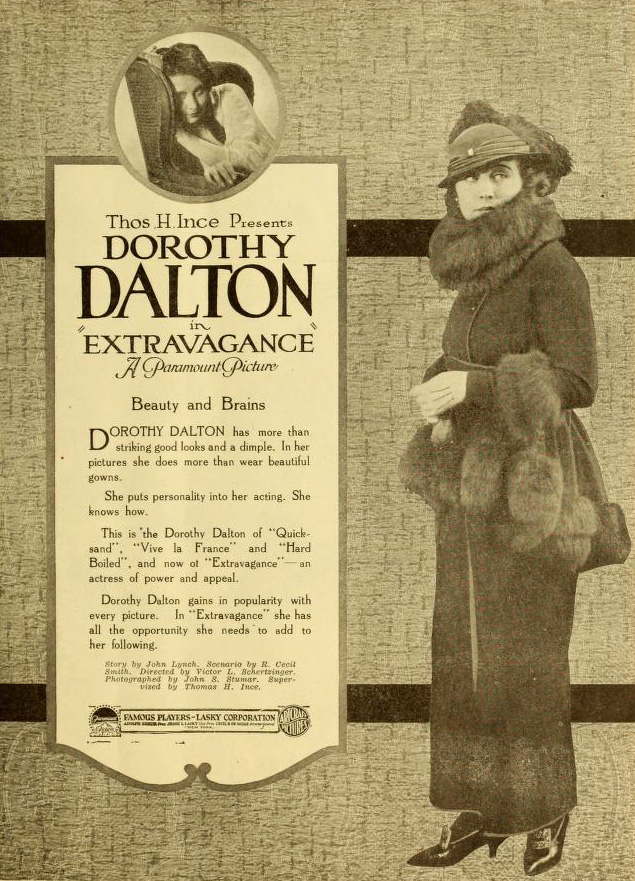
Extravagance (1919)

Scene from the 1922 film Moran of the Lady Letty, featuring Dorothy Dalton and Rudolph Valentino.

Year	Title	Role	Notes
1914	Pierre of the Plains	Jen Galbraith	Lost film
1914	Across the Pacific	Elsie Escott	Lost film
1915	The Disciple	Mary Houston	Lost film
1916	The Three Musketeers	Queen Anne	Alternative title: D'Artagnan
1916	The Raiders	Dorothy Haldeman	Lost film
1916	Civilization's Child	Ellen McManus	Lost film
1916	The Captive God	Tecolote	
1916	The Jungle Child	Ollante	Alternative title: The Barbarian; Lost film
1916	The Vagabond Prince	Lola "Fluffy"	
1916	A Gamble in Souls	Freda Maxey	Lost film
1916	The Female of the Species	Gloria Marley	Alternative title: The Vampire; Lost film
1917	The Weaker Sex	Ruth Tilden	Lost film
1917	Chicken Casey	Chicken Casey/Mavis Marberry	Alternative title: Waifs
1917	Back of the Man	Ellen Horton	Lost film
1917	The Dark Road	Cleo Morrison	Alternative title: The Road to Honour; Lost film
1917	Wild Winship's Widow	Catherine Winship	Lost film
1917	The Flame of the Yukon	Ethel Evans/The Flame	
1917	Ten of Diamonds	Neva Blaine	Lost film
1917	The Price Mark	Paula Lee	
1917	Love Letters	Eileen Rodney	
1918	Flare-Up Sal	Flare-Up Sal	
1918	Love Me	Maida Madison	
1918	Unfaithful	Helen Karge	Lost film
1918	Tyrant Fear	Allaine Grandet	
1918	The Mating of Marcella	Marcella Duranzo	Lost film
1918	The Kaiser's Shadow	Paula Harris	Alternative title: The Triple Cross; Lost film
1918	Green Eyes	Shirley Hunter	Lost film
1918	Vive la France!	Genevieve Bouchette	
1918	Dorothy Dalton in a Liberty Loan Appeal	Red Cross nurse	
1918	Quicksand	Mary Bowen	Alternative title: Quicksands; Lost film
1919	The Market of Souls	Helen Armes	
1919	Hard Boiled	Corinne Melrose	
1919	Extravagance	Helen Douglas	Lost film
1919	The Homebreaker	Mary Marbury	Lost film
1919	The Lady of Red Butte	Faro Fan	Alternative title: The Lady of Red Brute; Lost film
1919	Other Men's Wives	Cynthia Brock	Lost film
1919	L'apache	Natalie "La Bourget" Bourget/Helen Armstrong	Lost film
1919	His Wife's Friend	Lady Miriam Grimwood	Lost film
1920	Black Is White	Margaret Brood/Yvonne Strakosch	
1920	The Dark Mirror	Priscilla Maine/Nora O'Moore	
1920	Guilty of Love	Thelma Miller	Lost film
1920	Half an Hour	Lady Lillian Garson	Lost film
1920	A Romantic Adventuress	Alice Vanni	Lost film
1921	The Idol of the North	Colette Brissac	Lost film
1921	Behind Masks	Jeanne Mesurier	Alternative titles: In Men's Eyes; Incomplete film
1921	Fool's Paradise	Poll Patchouli	
1922	Moran of the Lady Letty	Moran Letty Sternersen	
1922	The Crimson Challenge	Tharon Last	Lost film
1922	The Woman Who Walked Alone	The Honorable Iris Champneys	
1922	The Siren Call	Charlotte Woods, a dancer	
1922	On the High Seas	Leone Deveraux	Lost film
1923	Dark Secrets	Ruth Rutherford	Lost film
1923	Fog Bound	Gale Brenon	Lost film
1923	Law of the Lawless	Sahande	Lost film
1924	The Moral Sinner	Leah Kleschna	Lost film
1924	The Lone Wolf	Lucy Shannon	Lost film
