= The Vanity Pool =

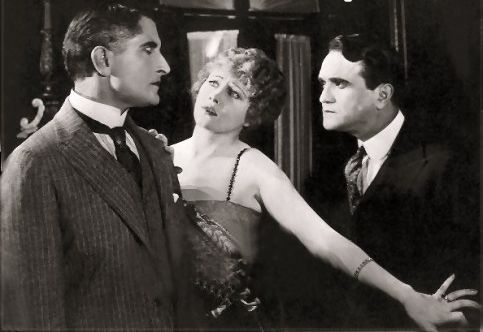
- Still with, from left, Thomas Holding, Anna Q. Nilsson, Franklyn Farnum
- Directed by: Ida May Park
- Written by: Ida May Park
- Based on: The Vanity Pool by Nalbro Bartley
- Produced by: Carl Laemmle
- Starring: Mary MacLaren; Anna Q. Nilsson; Thomas Holding
- Cinematography: King D. Gray
- Distributed by: Universal Film Manufacturing Company
- Release date: December 7, 1918
- Running time: 60 minutes
- Country: United States
- Language: Silent (English intertitles)

The Vanity Pool is a lost 1918 American silent film drama directed by Ida May Park and starring Mary MacLaren, Anna Q. Nilsson, and Thomas Holding. The script was based on a short story by Nalbro Bartley that was originally published in Young's Magazine. The film was produced and distributed by Universal Film Manufacturing Company. The film centered around a female lobbyist who becomes involved in political intrigue when she begins lobbying for the election of her friend's husband.

== Cast ==
- Mary MacLaren as Marna Royal
- Anna Q. Nilsson as Carol Harper
- Thomas Holding as Gerald Harper
- Marin Sais as Diana Casper
- Virginia Chester as Mrs. Royal
- Franklyn Farnum as Drew Garrett
- Winter Hall as Uncle Penny
- Frank Brownlee as Jarvis Flint
- Willis Marks as Mr. Royal
- Mae Talbot as Miss Key
