= The Right of Way (1920 film) =

1920 film by John Francis Dillon

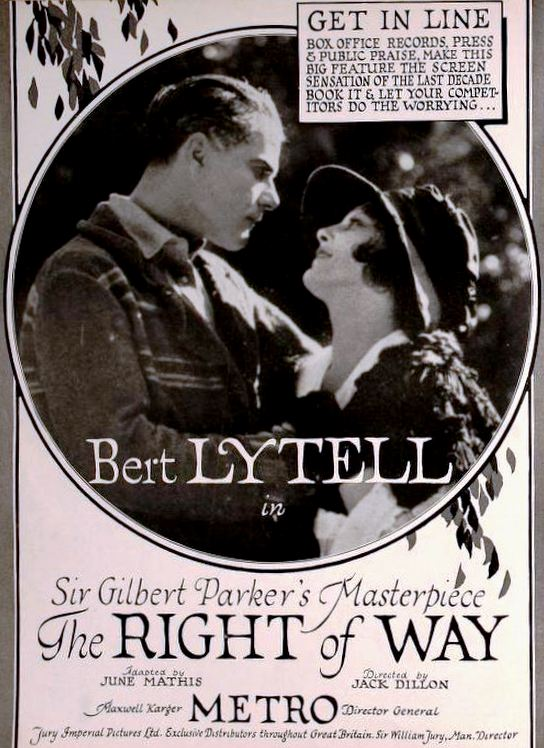
- Advertisement
- Directed by: John Francis Dillon
- Written by: June Mathis
- Based on: The Right of Way by Sir Gilbert Parker
- Produced by: Maxwell Karger
- Starring: Bert Lytell; Leatrice Joy
- Cinematography: Robert Kurrle; Sol Polito
- Distributed by: Metro Pictures
- Release date: February 29, 1920
- Running time: 70 minutes
- Country: United States
- Language: Silent (English intertitles)

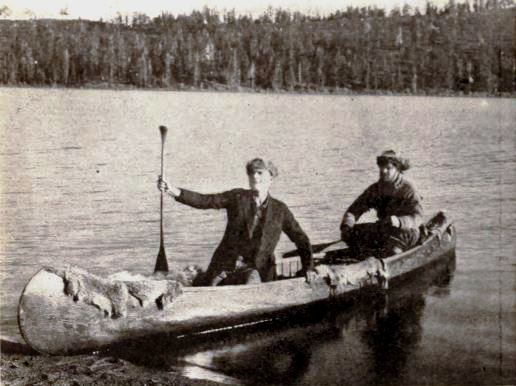
still of a scene.

Starring Bert Lytell, The Right of Way is a lost 1920 American remade silent film directed by John Francis Dillon and distributed by Metro Pictures. The film was previously filmed in 1915 and released on February 29, 1920 in the United States.

== Cast ==
- Bert Lytell as Charley Steele
- Gibson Gowland as Jo Portugais
- Leatrice Joy as Rosalie Eventurail
- Virginia Caldwell as Kathleen Stle
- Antrim Short as Billy Wantage
- Carmen Phillips as Paulette Du Bois
- Frank Currier as Seigneur
- Henry Harmon as Cure
- Larry Steers as Captain Tom Fairing
