= The Right of Way (1915 film) =

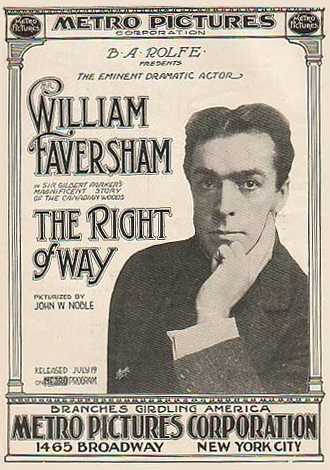
- Directed by: John W. Noble
- Written by: H. O. Carleton
- Based on: The Right of Way by Eugene Presbrey
- Produced by: B. A. Rolfe
- Starring: William Faversham; Jane Grey
- Cinematography: H. O. Carleton
- Distributed by: Metro Pictures
- Release date: July 19, 1915
- Running time: 5 reels
- Country: USA
- Language: Silent..English titles

The Right of Way is a lost 1915 silent film directed by John W. Noble and starring William Faversham. It is based on a 1907 play by Eugene Wiley Presbrey from the book by Sir Gilbert Parker. It was distributed by Metro Pictures. Faversham's motion picture debut.

The film was remade as The Right of Way in 1920 starring Bert Lytell.

== Cast ==
- William Faversham as Charlie Steele
- Jane Grey as Rosalie
- Edward Brennan as Joe Portugaise
- Henri Bergman as Trudel
- Harold De Becker as Billy Wantage
