= Pierre of the Plains =

Pierre of the Plains may refer to:

- Pierre of the Plains (1942 film), a Northern film
- Pierre of the Plains (1914 film), a film based on the novel Pierre and his People by Gilbert Parker
