= Reeva =

Reeva may refer to:

- Reeva (restaurant), restaurant in Portland, Oregon, United States
- Reeva Greenwood (1893–1972), American actress
- Reeva Potoff, (born 1941), American visual artist
- Reeva Steenkamp (1983–2013), South African model and paralegal
- Reeva Payge, a Marvel Comics character featured in The Gifted
- Reeva (food brand), a food brand mostly associated with instant noodles, owned by Uniben of Vietnam.
