= Philip Hahn =

American silent film actor (1884–1976)

Philip Hahn (1884 – August 4, 1976) was an American actor. He was in silent films including the lead role in The Price He Paid, an adaptation of an Ella Wheeler Wilcox poem, and The Dancer's Peril. According to Motography, he was a painter in Amsterdam until he went color blind.

== Filmography ==
- The Price He Paid (1914)
- The Nightingale (1914 film)
- The Garden of Lies (1915)
- The Senator (1915) as Count Ernst von Strahl in the film adaptation
- The Bachelor's Romance (1915)
- The Woman's Law (1916)
- The Scarlet Oath (1916) also titled The Other Sister
- Playing with Fire (1916 film)
- The Dancer's Peril (1917), as Grand Duke Alexis
