= Gertrude Shipman =

American actress

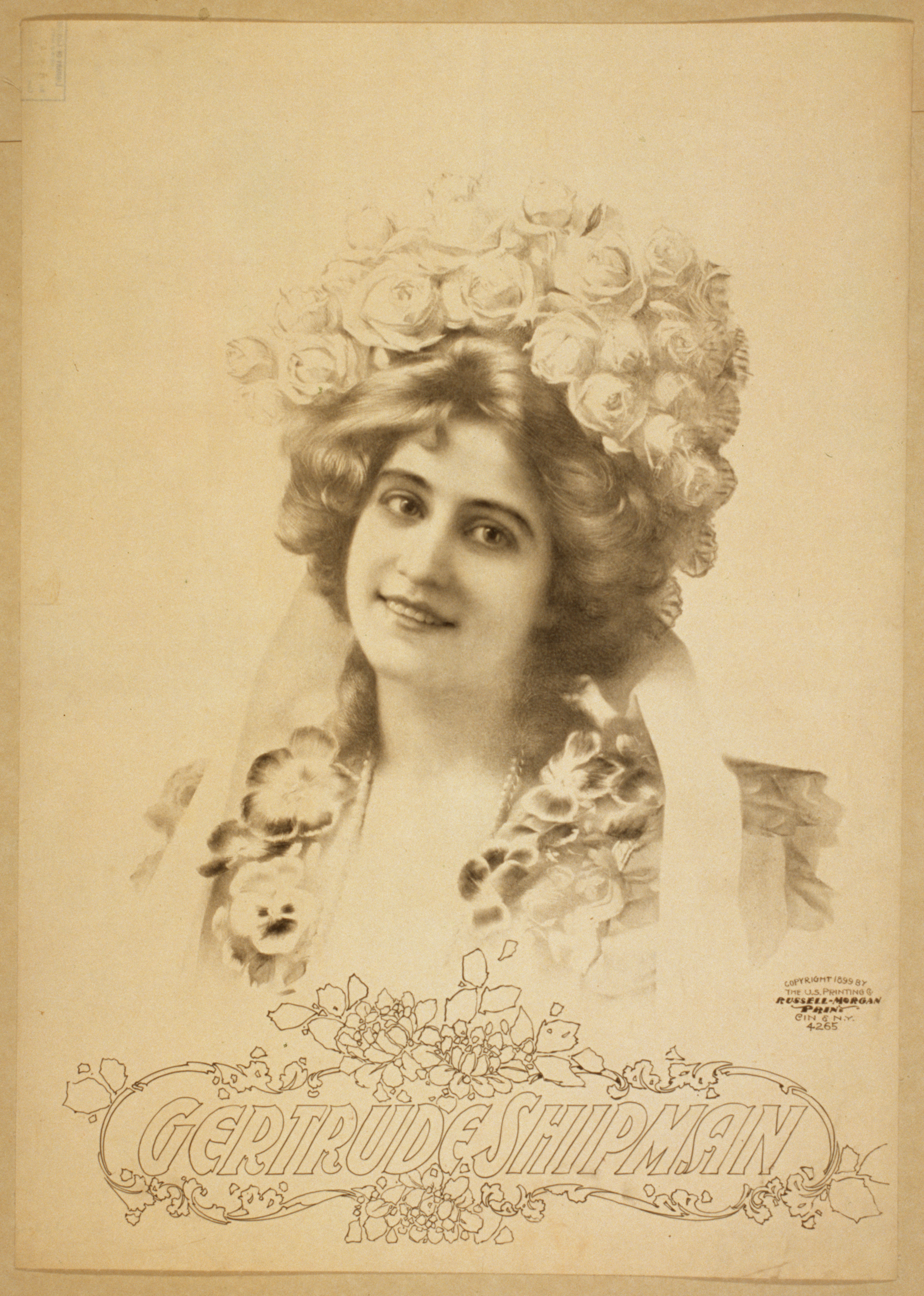
1899 lithograph of Shipman

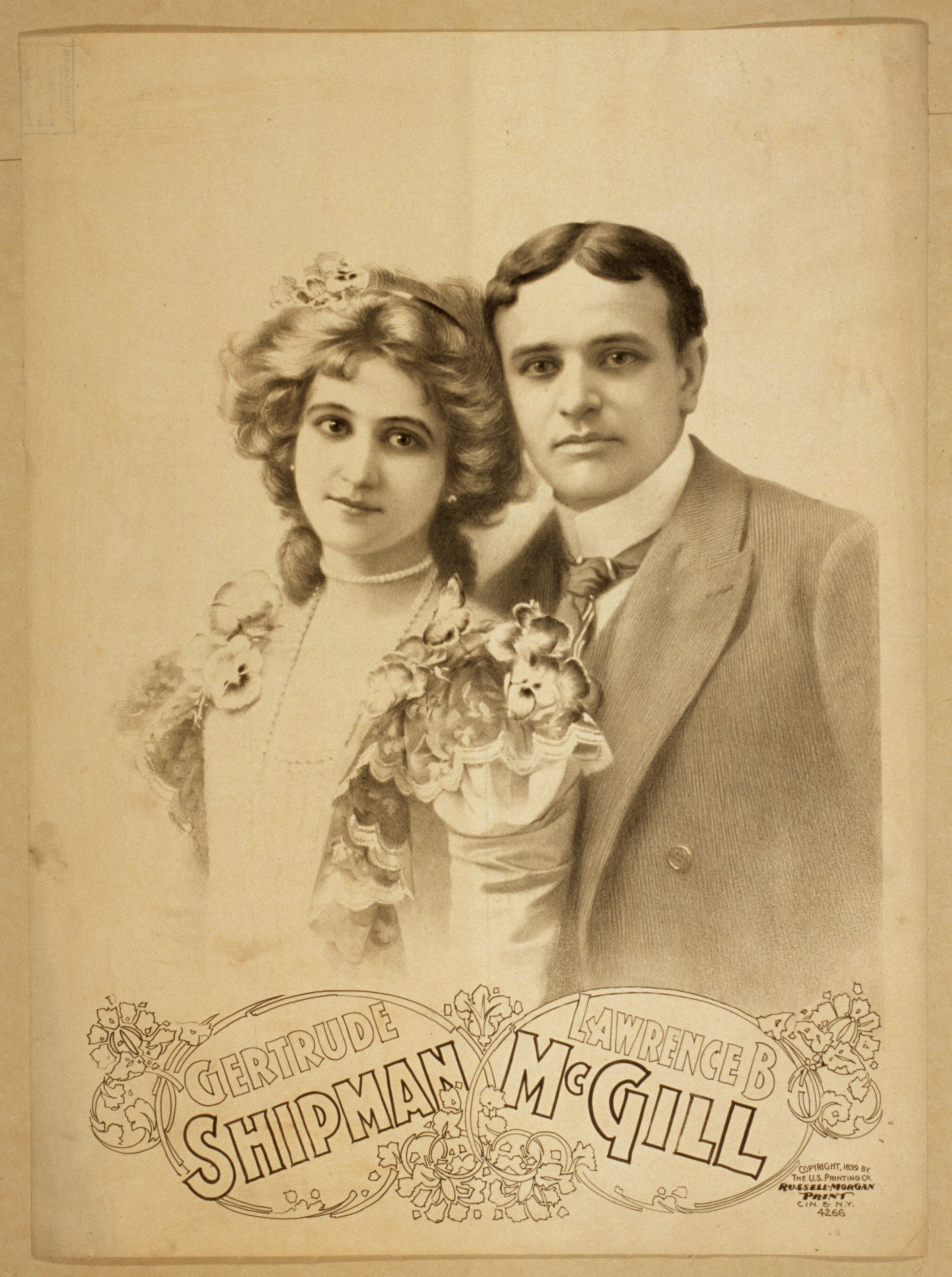
1899 lithograph of Shipan and Lawrence B. McGill, Library of Congress

Gertrude Shipman, also known as Gertrude Shipman McGill (August 20, 1879 (Note: Elizabeth Jane and Robert Shipman had a daughter, Gertrude Arnetta Shipman who was baptized on April 9, 1876.)–February 14, 1960), was an American actress who at twenty years of age was considered one of the leading actresses of the Kingston Dramatic Company. She performed on stage, often with her husband Lawrence B. McGill, and established her own company of performers by 1906. She acted in four films. Camille (1912), Checkers (1913), Arizona (1913), and The Price He Paid (1914). She is also credited with writing the photoplay for the film The Vagabond (1912).

== Personal life ==
Shipman was born on August 20, 1879, in Pittsburgh, Pennsylvania, to Elizabeth J. Brooks Shipman and Robert W. Shipman. Her father was a farmer, an operator of an installment house, and an investor in a theatrical business. She had a brother named L. B. Shipman. She graduated from Berkeley Lyceum, which was a small playhouse in New York City until 1916.

She married Lawrence B. McGill on November 18, 1899, in Maysville, Kentucky at the Central Presbyterian Church. They were both employed by the Kingston Dramatic Company and they were in the town for a production at the opera house. (Note: They performed on the day of their wedding in Maysville, Kentucky.) Her father, who had a financial interest in the company, attended the wedding. After her marriage, she went by the names Gertrude Alice McGill and Gertrude Shipman McGill.

Lawrence McGill was a director, writer and actor from Courtland, Mississippi. It was his second marriage. Shipman and McGill had a son named Edmund Robert McGill (born August 18, 1904), who worked as a radio producer and writer. They lived in Waldo, Florida.

== Career ==
Shipman played the lead role of The Senator’s Daughter in Fort Wayne, Indiana in May 1899 for the Keystone Dramatic Company, which provided quality plays and entertainment at reasonable prices. She made a "favorable impression" and the performers left the audience "highly entertained". She was described as "A clever leading lady" and one of the favorite members of the company that year.

Shipman and McGill played a "dandy repertoire of plays" in opera houses across Ohio, Pennsylvania and New Jersey starting by November 1899. Shipman primarily performed with her husband, such as the naval drama The Signal of Liberty, the five-act Escape the Law, From Sire to Son, and Heart of the Mountains. The Signal of Liberty was described as a powerful play, "filled with dramatic scenes and the comedy which comes in naturally." She performed the roles of mother and daughter in From Sire to Son. She performed in the five-act play, The Woman from Martinque.

A year after their marriage, Shipman and McGill returned to the Washington Opera House of Maysville and performed in A Soldier of the Empire by Howard Hall. For her work with Keystone Dramatic Company, she has been described as: ".. not the mechanical and stagy heroine so often seen in repertoire companies, but a creature of flesh and blood, and her earnest and conscientious work last night was pleasing and artistic." Shipman was described as “the star of the company and deserves to be at its head. She is an earnest, painstaking actress, has excellent contact with her emotions.

In 1901, she and Lawrence B. McGill copyrighted The Marriage Contract, a play. She had her own company Gertrude McGill & Company, when she performed in Bridgeport, Connecticut, in 1906. The same year, Shipman, McGill, and a supporting company performed Raffles at the opening of the vaudeville season.

She starred in the 1912 film Camille, an adaptation of Alexandre Dumas novel, with Irving Cummings, directed by Jay Hunt. A reviewer described her performance as superb.

Gertrude McGill & Company performed Oh, You Steve, in Bridgewater, New Jersey, and Portland, Oregon, in 1911. The Club Woman was produced in Minneapolis, Minnesota, in 1913. She appeared in a John Patrick Mulgrew play in Chicago in 1919. Inside Outside Inn, a comedy, was performed by the company at the Sandusky Theater in 1920.

== Death ==
McGill died on February 22, 1928, and Shipman died on February 14, 1960. They are buried at the Laurel Grove Cemetery in Waldo, Florida.

== Filmography ==
- Camille (1912 film)
- The Vagabond (1912 film)
- Checkers (1913 film)
- Arizona (1913 film) as Estrella Bonham
- The Price He Paid (1914) as Lucie
