= The Scarlet Oath =

1916 silent film

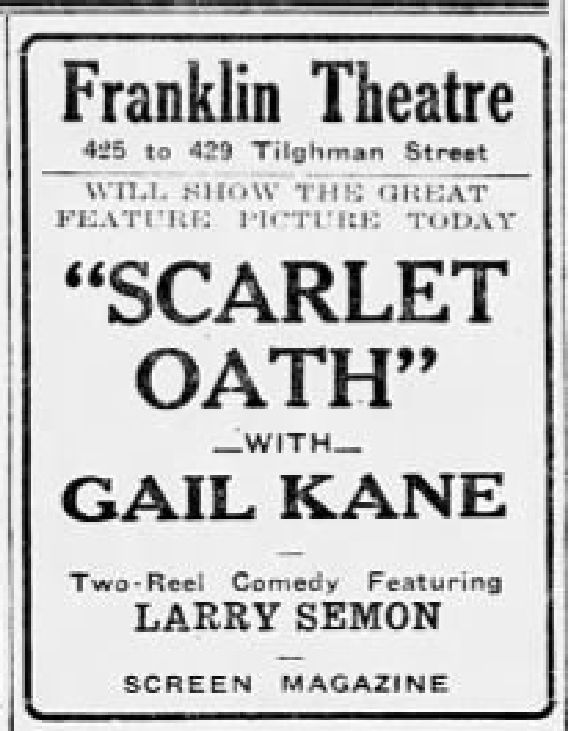
- Newspaper advertisement
- Directed by: Frank Powell; Travers Vale
- Written by: Gardner Hunting; Frederic Kulz
- Produced by: William A. Brady
- Starring: Gail Kane; Philip Hahn; Carleton Macy
- Cinematography: André Barlatier - (French Wikipedia)
- Production company: Peerless Pictures
- Distributed by: World Film
- Release date: October 23, 1916
- Running time: 50 minutes
- Country: United States
- Language: Silent (English intertitles)

The Scarlet Oath is a 1916 American silent drama film directed by Frank Powell and Travers Vale and starring Gail Kane, Philip Hahn, and Carleton Macy.

== Cast ==
- Gail Kane as Olga Pavloff / Nina Pavloff
- Philip Hahn as Ivan Pavloff
- Carleton Macy as Victor Karenin
- Lillian Paige as Mrs. Victor Krenin
- Alan Hale as John Huntington
- Montagu Love as Nicholas Savaroff
- Boris Korlin as Caganov

== Bibliography ==
- George A. Katchmer. Eighty Silent Film Stars: Biographies and Filmographies of the Obscure to the Well Known. McFarland, 1991.
