= Sealed Valley =

1915 film directed by Lawrence McGill

- Directed by: Lawrence McGill
- Based on: the novel, The Sealed Valley by Hulbert Footner
- Starring: Dorothy Donnelly; J. W. Johnson; Rene Ditline
- Cinematography: W. C. Thompson
- Production company: Metro Pictures
- Release date: August 2, 1915 (US)
- Running time: 5 reels
- Country: United States
- Languages: Silent; English intertitles

Sealed Valley is a 1915 American silent Western film, directed by Lawrence McGill. It stars Dorothy Donnelly, J. W. Johnson, Rene Ditline, and was released on August 2, 1915. It was the first film produced by Metro Pictures.

== Cast list ==
- Dorothy Donnelly as Nahnya Crossfox
- J. W. Johnson as Doctor Cowdray
- Rene Ditline as Kitty Sholto
