= Ella Wheeler Wilcox =

American author and poet (1850–1919)

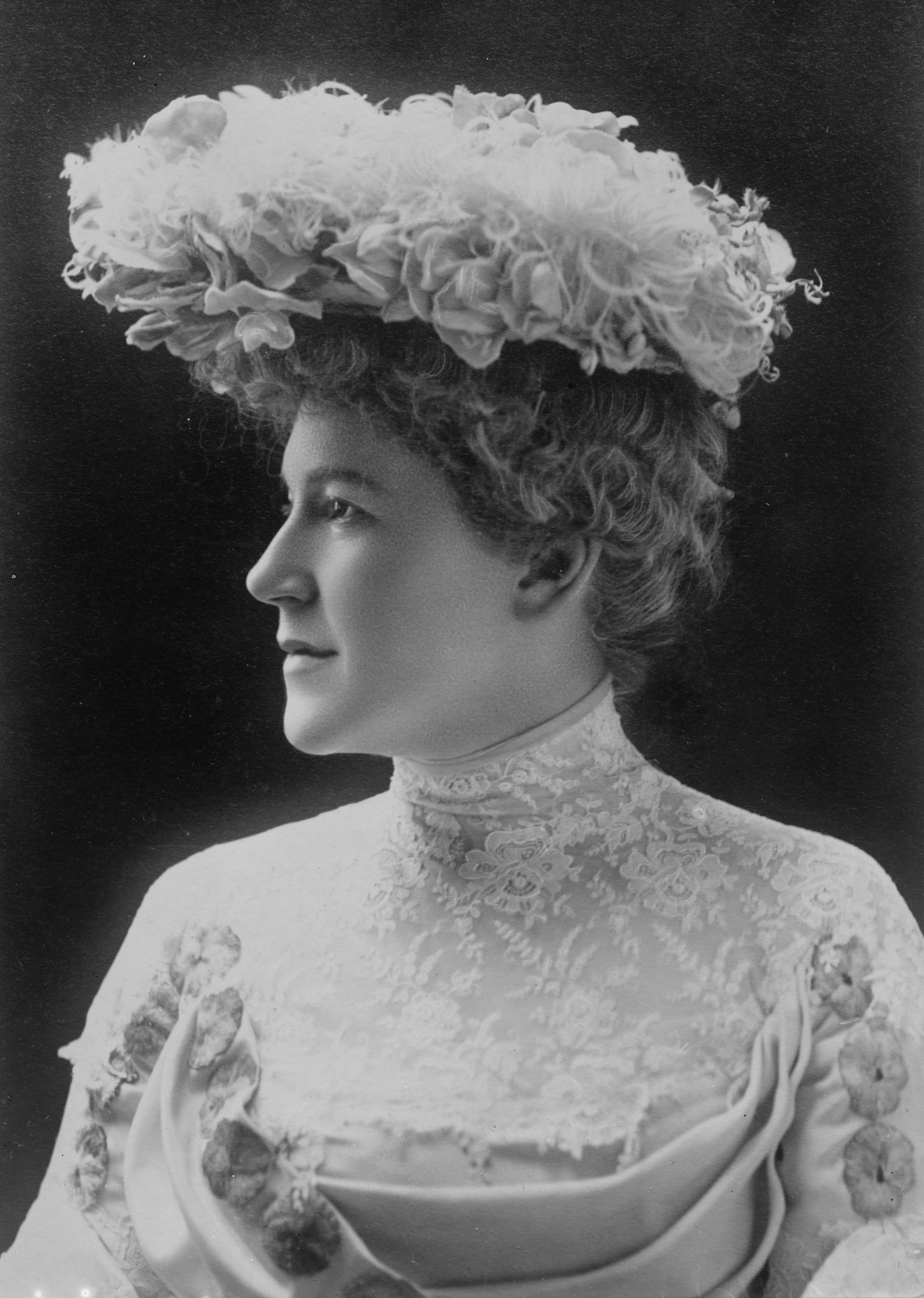
- Born: November 5, 1850; Johnstown, Wisconsin, U.S.
- Died: October 30, 1919 (aged 68); Branford, Connecticut, U.S.
- Occupations: Author, poet

Ella Wheeler Wilcox (November 5, 1850 – October 30, 1919) was an American author and poet. Her works include the collection Poems of Passion and the poem "Solitude", which contains the lines "Laugh, and the world laughs with you; weep, and you weep alone." Her autobiography, The Worlds and I, was published in 1918, a year before her death.

== Early life and education ==
Ella Wheeler was born in 1850 on a farm in Johnstown, Wisconsin, east of Janesville, the youngest of four children. The family later moved north of Madison, after losing its wealth, as the result of her father's failed business aspirations and speculation. The household placed a strong emphasis on intellectual pursuits and valued careful use of the English language. During her childhood, Wilcox spent much of her time reading the books and newspapers available to her, including works such as The Arabian Nights, The Diverting History of John Gilpin, Gulliver's Travels, and most notably the plays of William Shakespeare (which later influenced her writing) in addition to the few other pieces of literature that were to be had in her home.

Around the age of 8, Wilcox turned to writing poetry as an outlet. When she was 13 years old, her first poem was published. After losing her subscription to The New York Mercury, and being unable to afford to resubscribe, Wilcox thought that if she could get a piece of literature published, she would at least receive a copy of the paper wherein her piece was printed. The piece that she submitted is lost, and Wilcox later admitted that she could not recall even the topic of the poem. Wilcox became known as a poet in her own state by the time she graduated from high school. She was educated in a country school and attended Madison University for one year before asking her mother to return home.

== Career ==
=== Early poetry ===
Her poem "The Way of the World" was first published in the February 25, 1883, issue of The New York Sun. The inspiration for the poem came as she was travelling to attend the Governor's inaugural ball in Madison, Wisconsin. On her way to the celebration, there was a young woman dressed in black sitting across the aisle from her. The woman was crying. Miss Wheeler sat next to her and sought to comfort her for the rest of the journey. When they arrived, the poet was so depressed that she could barely attend the scheduled festivities. As she looked at her own radiant face in the mirror, she suddenly recalled the sorrowful widow. It was at that moment that she wrote the opening lines of "Solitude":

Laugh, and the world laughs with you;
Weep, and you weep alone.
For the sad old earth must borrow its mirth
But has trouble enough of its own

She sent the poem to the Sun and received $5 for her effort. It was collected in the book Poems of Passion shortly afterward in May 1883. This collection was reported to have made $2000 that year.

=== Marriage ===
In 1884, she married Robert M. Wilcox of Meriden, Connecticut, where the couple lived before moving to New York City and then to Granite Bay in the Short Beach section of Branford, Connecticut. The two homes they built on Long Island Sound, along with several cottages, became known as Bungalow Court, and they would hold gatherings there of literary and artistic friends. They had one child, a son, who died shortly after birth. Not long after their marriage, they both became interested in Theosophy, New Thought, and Spiritualism.

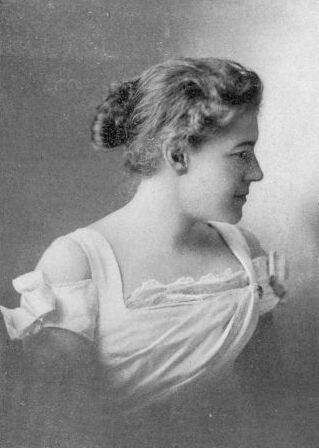
Ella Wheeler Wilcox, 1897

Early in their married life, Robert and Ella Wheeler Wilcox promised each other that whoever died first would return and communicate with the other. Robert Wilcox died in 1916, after over thirty years of marriage. She was overcome with grief, which became ever more intense as week after week went without any message from him. It was at this time that she went to California to see the Rosicrucian astrologer, Max Heindel, still seeking help in her sorrow, still unable to understand why she had no word from her Robert. She wrote of this meeting:

In talking with Max Heindel, the leader of the Rosicrucian Philosophy in California, he made very clear to me the effect of intense grief. Mr. Heindel assured me that I would come in touch with the spirit of my husband when I learned to control my sorrow. I replied that it seemed strange to me that an omnipotent God could not send a flash of his light into a suffering soul to bring its conviction when most needed. Did you ever stand beside a clear pool of water, asked Mr. Heindel, and see the trees and skies repeated therein? And did you ever cast a stone into that pool and see it clouded and turmoiled, so it gave no reflection? Yet the skies and trees were waiting above to be reflected when the waters grew calm. So God and your husband's spirit wait to show themselves to you when the turbulence of sorrow is quieted.

Several months later she composed a mantra or affirmative prayer which she said over and over "I am the living witness: The dead live: And they speak through us and to us: And I am the voice that gives this glorious truth to the suffering world: I am ready, God: I am ready, Christ: I am ready, Robert."

Wilcox became involved with Rosicrucianism herself, serving on the Supreme Council of the American Rosicrucian until her death in 1919.

== Personal life and death ==
Wilcox was an advocate of animal rights and vegetarianism.

She died on October 30, 1919, at her "The Bungalow" home in Branford. She was cremated.

== Poetry ==
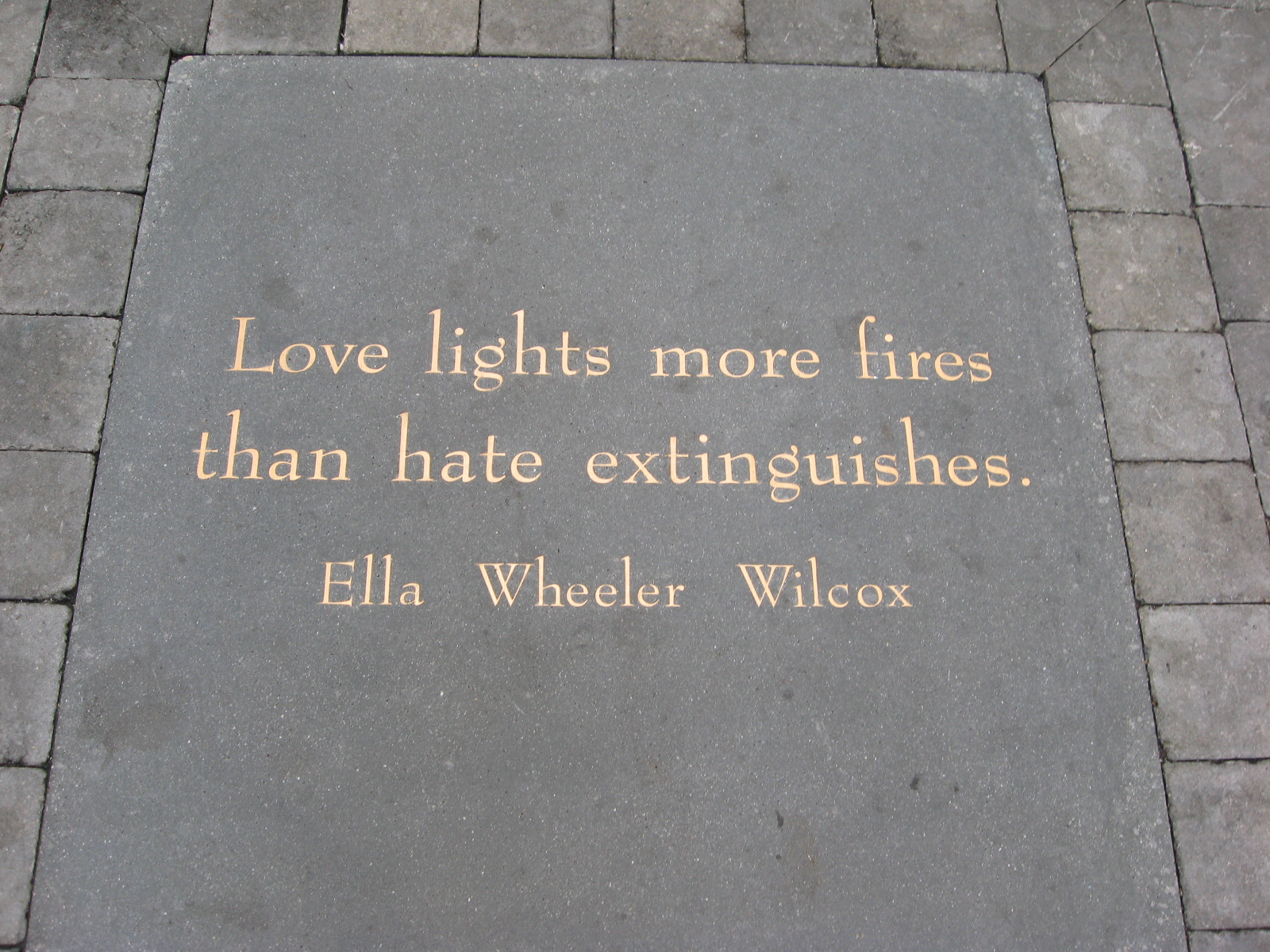
Ella's poem plaque at San Francisco's Jack Kerouac Alley.

None of Wilcox's works were included by F. O. Matthiessen in The Oxford Book of American Verse, but Hazel Felleman chose fourteen of her poems for Best Loved Poems of the American People, while Martin Gardner selected "The Way Of The World" and "The Winds of Fate" for Best Remembered Poems.

She is cited in the anthology of bad poetry, Very Bad Poetry. Sinclair Lewis indicates Babbitt's lack of literary sophistication by having him refer to a piece of verse as "one of the classic poems, like 'If—' by Kipling, or Ella Wheeler Wilcox's 'The Man Worth While.'" The latter opens:

It is easy enough to be pleasant,
When life flows by like a song,
But the man worth while is one who will smile,
When everything goes dead wrong.

Her poem "Solitude" opens:

Laugh and the world laughs with you,
Weep, and you weep alone;
The good old earth must borrow its mirth,
But has trouble enough of its own.

The Winds of Fate

One ship drives east and another drives west
With the selfsame winds that blow.
'Tis the set of the sails,
And Not the gales,
That tell us the way to go.

Like the winds of the sea are the ways of fate;
As we voyage along through life,
'Tis the set of a soul
That decides its goal,
And not the calm or the strife.

Wheeler Wilcox cared about alleviating animal suffering, as can be seen from her poem, "Voice of the Voiceless". It begins as follows:

So many gods, so many creeds,
So many paths that wind and wind,
While just the art of being kind
Is all the sad world needs.

I am the voice of the voiceless;
Through me the dumb shall speak,
Till the deaf world's ear be made to hear
The wrongs of the wordless weak.

From street, from cage, and from kennel,
From stable and zoo, the wail
Of my tortured kin proclaims the sin
Of the mighty against the frail.

She made an appearance during World War I in France, reciting her poem, The Stevedores ("Here's to the Army stevedores, lusty virile and strong...") while visiting a camp of 9,000 US Army stevedores.

== Works ==
=== Poetry ===
- Maurine and other Poems (1882, Jansen, McClurg & Company [Chicago])
- Poems of Passion (1883, W.B. Conkey Company [Chicago])
- Drops of Water (1889, The National Temperance Society and Publication House [New York])
- Poems of Pleasure (1888, Belford, Clarke, and Company [New York])
- Poems of Reflection (1905, M. A. Donahue & Co. [Chicago])
- Poems of Cheer (1908, Gay and Hancock Ltd [London])
- Poems of Experience (1910, Gay and Hancock Ltd [London])
- Poems of Progress and New Thought Pastels (1909, W.B. Conkey Company [Chicago])
- Poems of Problems (1914, W.B. Conkey Company [Chicago])
- Poems of Affection (1920 Gay and Hancock Ltd [London])
- Poems of Life (1921)

=== Novels ===
- Mal Moulée: A Novel (1885)
- A Double Life (1890)
- Sweet Danger (1892)
- A Woman of the World: Her Counsel to Other People's Sons and Daughters (1904)

=== Plays ===
- Mizpah (1906) Selig Polyscope planned a 9-reel film adaptation in 1915.

=== Miscellaneous ===
- The Heart of New Thought (1902)
- The Story of a Literary Career (1905)
- New Thought Common Sense and What Life Means to Me (1908)
- The Worlds and I (1918)

=== Adaptations ===
Several of Wilcox's poems were the basis for silent films:

- The Price He Paid (1914)
- The Beautiful Lie (1917)
- The Belle of the Season (1919)
- The Man Worth While (1921)

== In popular culture ==
The titles for the ten episodes of the final and fifth season of the science fiction television series Orphan Black come from Wilcox's poem, "Protest". The opening lines of the poem, "To sin by silence, when we should protest, Makes cowards out of men", is also featured in the opening credits of the film JFK (1991).

The lines "Laugh and the world laughs with you / Weep, and you weep alone" from Wilcox's poem "Solitude" feature several times in the 2003 Korean thriller film Oldboy.

Margaret Thatcher in a TV interview with David Frost, aired 12th June 1995 on BBC One, quoted lines for "the set of the sail and not the gale" from the Winds of Fate as illustrating that "it is not the circumstances that you see in life, but the way you approach them, the set of your own personality, that determines how you can go forwards".
