= Poems of Passion =

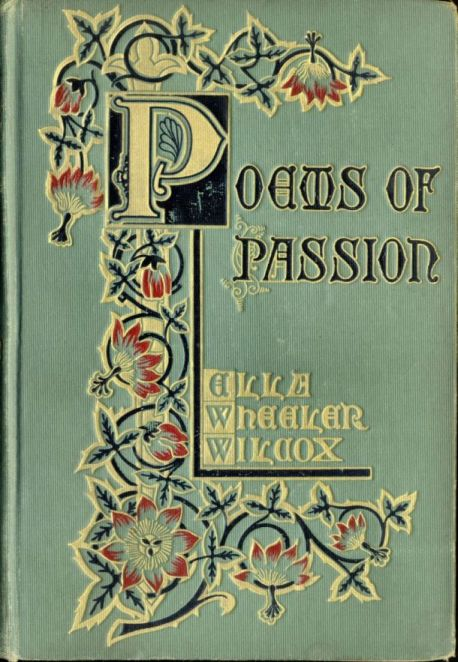
Cover of the first edition of Poems of Passion, 1883

Poems of Passion is a collection of poems by Ella Wheeler Wilcox that was published in 1883.

Despite the fact that the book's title "threatened to spark a scandal," eventually it "was embraced by thousands of perfectly respectable midwestern readers."

== Contents ==
Poems of Passion contains the following poems:

- Love's Language
- Impatience
- Communism
- The Common Lot
- Individuality
- Friendship After Love
- Queries
- Upon the Sand
- Reunited
- What shall we do?
- "The beautiful blue Danube"
- Answered
- Through the valley
- But One
- Guilo
- The Duet
- Little Queen
- Wherefore?
- Delilah
- Love Song
- Time and Love
- Change
- Desolation
- Isaura
- The coquette
- New and old
- quite the same
- From the grave
- A Waltz-Quadrille
- Beppo
- Tired
- The speech of silence
- Conversion
- Love's coming
- Old and new
- Perfectness
- Attraction
- Gracia
- Ad finem
- Bleak Weather
- An answer
- You will forget me
- The farewell of Clarimonde
- The Trio

Miscellaneous poems:

- The Lost Garden
- Art and Heart
- Mockery
- As by fire
- If I should die
- Misalliance
- Response
- Drought
- The Creed
- Progress
- My friend
- Creation
- Red carnations
- Life is too short
- A sculptor
- Beyond
- The saddest hour
- Show me the way
- My heritage
- Resolve
- At Eleusis
- Courage
- Solitude
- The year outgrows the spring
- The beautiful land of nod
- The tiger
- Only a simple rhyme
- I will be worthy of it
- Sonnet
- Regret
- Let me lean hard
- Penalty
- Sunset
- The wheel of my breast
- A meeting
- Earnestness
- A picture
- Twin-born
- Floods
- A fable
