= The New York Idea (1920 film) =

1920 film by Herbert Blaché

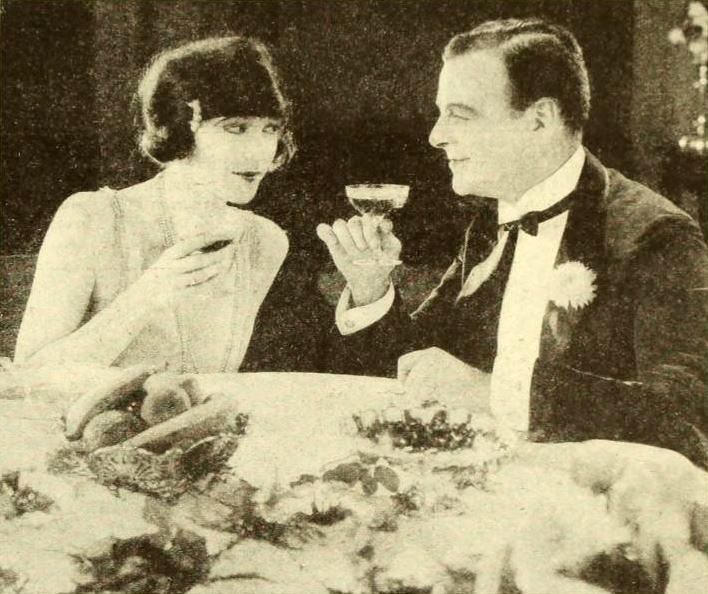
- Film still with Alice Brady and Lowell Sherman
- Directed by: Herbert Blaché; Marcel Del Sano (asst. director)
- Written by: Langdon Mitchell (play); Mary Murillo (scenario)
- Based on: The New York Idea by Langdon Mitchell
- Cinematography: Jacques Bizeul(fr)
- Production company: Realart Pictures Corporation
- Distributed by: Realart Pictures Corporation
- Release date: November 27, 1920
- Running time: 5 reels
- Country: United States
- Language: Silent (English intertitles)

The New York Idea is a 1920 American silent comedy film directed by Herbert Blaché and starring Alice Brady. The film was produced and distributed by Realart Pictures Corporation, an Adolph Zukor affiliate of his bigger Paramount Pictures.

The film is based on a 1906 Broadway play by Langdon Mitchell that starred Mrs. Fiske and George Arliss.

== Cast ==
- Alice Brady as Cynthia Karslake
- Lowell Sherman as John Karslake
- Hedda Hopper as Vida Phillimore
- George Howell as Judge Philip Phillimore
- Lionel Pape as Sir Wilfrid Darby
- Margaret Linden as Caroline Dwight
- Edwards Davis as Bishop Matthew Phillimore (billed as Edward Davis)
- Harry Hocky as Tim Fiddler
- Nina Herbert as Mrs. Fiddler
- Emily Fitzroy as Grace Phillimore
- Julia Hurley as Mrs. Phillimore
- Marie Burke as Miss Heneage
- Robert Vivian as Brooks
- Edgar Norton as Thomas
- George Stevens as Butler

== Preservation ==
Prints of the film exist at the International House of Photography, George Eastman Museum and the BFI National Archive, London.
