= The Lords of High Decision =

1916 film by Jack Harvey

- Directed by: Jack Harvey
- Written by: William H. Lippert (scenario)
- Based on: The Lords of High Decision by Meredith Nicholson
- Starring: Cyril Scott; Joseph W. Girard; William Welsh
- Distributed by: Universal Pictures
- Release date: February 28, 1916
- Country: USA
- Language: Silent

The Lords of High Decision is a 1916 American silent drama film, directed by Jack Harvey. It stars Cyril Scott, Joseph W. Girard, and William Welsh.

== Plot ==
Colonel Roger Craighill is a wealthy man from Pittsburgh. He meets with the directors of the Hercules Bank. He plans to ruin Gregory, an independent coal operator, and enlists his accomplice Walsh. Gregory lives with his granddaughter Jean. His mines are idle because the syndicate refuses him transportation to market. This leaves him poor. Jean is an artist. She sells her paintings to support them.

Craighill's son Wayne sees Joe Denny, the son of a miner, injured at a football game. He helps him. He also meets Adelaide Churchill and her mother. Wayne likes Adelaide but decides to forget her when he sees her with another man. After graduation Wayne is put in charge of Walsh. He is sent to the town where Gregory's plant is located. He meets Jean there. Gregory asks Wayne to influence the syndicate to restart the mine. When he learns Wayne is the son of the man who ruined him he is about to attack him. Jean stops him.

Jean goes to the city to sell more paintings. She meets Wayne again. Wayne has gone there to plead with his father to stop crushing competitors but fails. Wayne hires Joe Denny as his chauffeur. Craighill gives a speech criticizing workers. Adelaide and her mother meet Craighill. He is impressed with her. Joe sees Jean while waiting for Wayne. Wayne invites Jean to ride in his car. She drives him home. Joe notices Wayne's growing affection for Jean.

Craighill and Adelaide marry. Brooks, working for Walsh, stirs a strike at the mills while Craighill is away. Wayne stops the strike. He returns the men to work. Craighill introduces Adelaide to Wayne as his wife, not knowing they have met. Wayne confesses his love to Jean but she says a gulf separates them.

Later Gregory is found dead at Craighill's home. Jean learns of her grandfather's death. Meanwhile, the bank faces a $100,000 overdraft and other unpaid notes. The Hercules Bank closes. A mob storms Craighill's house. Wayne promises the people he will repay every dollar. Meanwhile, the miners begin blowing up the mines. Joe is badly hurt. Wayne rescues him. Explosions reveal oil and natural gas under the mines. This increases Craighill's property value.

The banks agree to support Craighill and Wayne. Jean mourns Joe but at the end she leans on Wayne's shoulder.

== Cast ==
- Cyril Scott - Wayne Craighill
- Joseph W. Girard - Colonel Graighill
- William Welsh - Walsh
- Joseph Daly - Gregory
- Marguerite Skirvin -Jean
- Mildred Gregory - Adelaide Churchill
- Mathilde Brundage - Mrs. Churchill
