= How Molly Made Good =

1915 film directed by Lawrence McGill

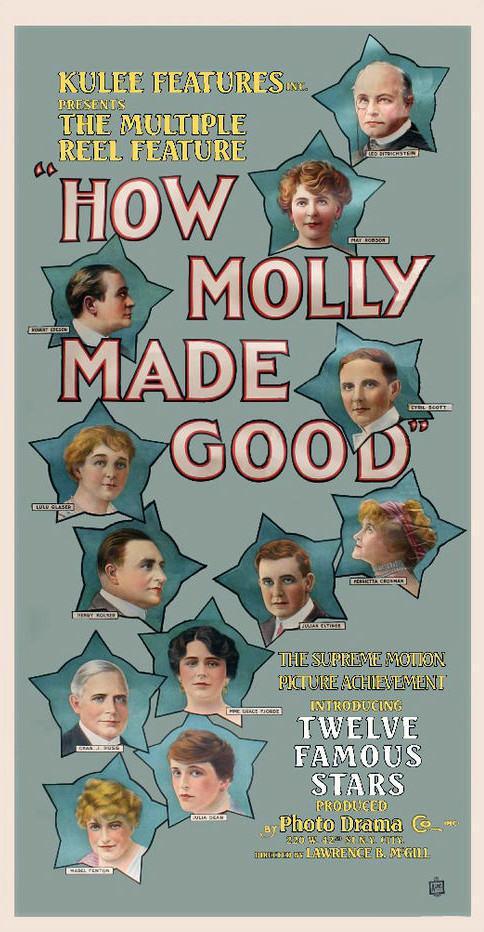
- Film poster
- Directed by: Lawrence B. McGill
- Written by: Burns Mantle
- Produced by: Lee Kugel
- Starring: Marguerite Gale
- Distributed by: Kulee Features
- Release date: October 26, 1915
- Running time: 6 reels
- Country: United States
- Language: Silent (English intertitles)

How Molly Made Good (aka: How Molly Malone Made Good) is a 1915 American silent drama film directed by Lawrence B. McGill which is one of the first films to feature cameo appearances by major celebrities. It survives in the Library of Congress and is available on DVD. The writer of the film, Burns Mantle, may have been influenced by the globe-trotting adventure of Nellie Bly in 1889, when the reporter circumnavigated the globe in a specified amount of time using several means of conveyance and visiting as many famous cities as possible.

The opera star Madame Fjorde's real name was Grace Fjorde and a real opera singer. She was previously thought to be a created character.

== Cast ==
- Marguerite Gale as Molly Malone
- Helen Hilton as Alva Hinton, Rival Reporter
- John Reedy as Reed, The Photographer
- William H. Tooker as Editor
- William A. Williams as Journalist
- Armand Cortes as Benny the Dip
- James Bagley as Morrison, Associate Editor
- Edward P. Sullivan as Journalist
- Madame Fjorde as Herself, cameo (aka Grace Fjorde)
- Lulu Glaser as Herself, cameo
- May Robson as Herself, cameo
- Henry Kolker as Himself, cameo
- Cyril Scott as Himself, cameo
- Julian Eltinge as Himself, cameo
- Charles J. Ross as Himself, cameo
- Mabel Fenton as Herself, cameo
- Robert Edeson as Himself, cameo
- Leo Ditrichstein as Himself, cameo
- Julia Dean as Herself, cameo
- Henrietta Crosman as Herself, cameo
