= The Dancer's Peril =

1917 film directed by Travers Vale

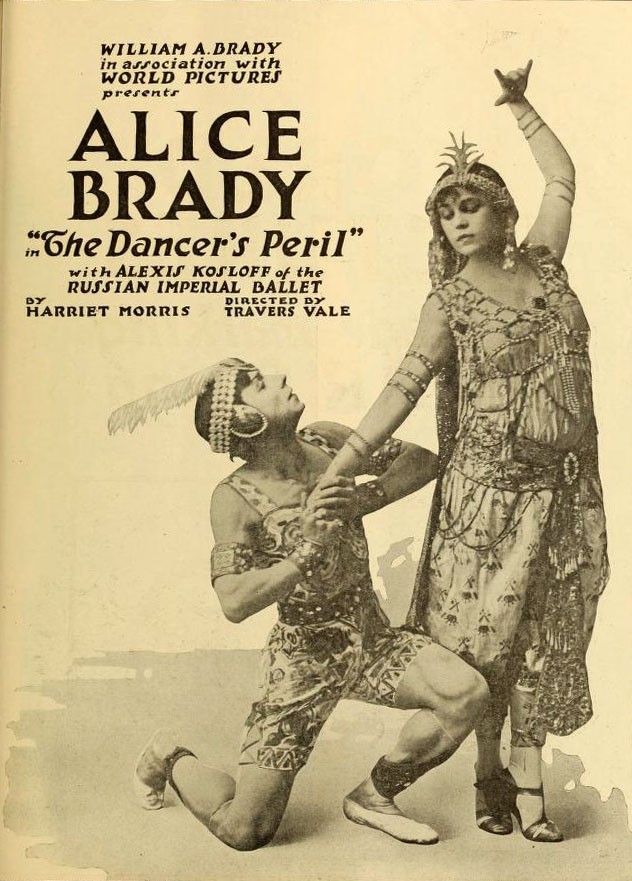
- Directed by: Travers Vale
- Written by: Harriet Morris
- Produced by: William A. Brady
- Starring: Alice Brady; Philip Hahn; Harry Benham
- Cinematography: Max Schneider
- Production company: World Film
- Distributed by: World Film
- Release date: March 12, 1917
- Running time: 50 minutes
- Country: United States
- Languages: Silent; English intertitles

The Dancer's Peril is a 1917 American silent romance film directed by Travers Vale and starring Alice Brady, Philip Hahn and Harry Benham. Its plotline features the Ballets Russes, then appearing in a show by the Shubert Brothers, major backers of World Film. The film still survives, unlike many others from the era.

== Cast ==
- Alice Brady as Mother/Daughter
- Philip Hahn as Grand Duke Alexis
- Harry Benham as Richard Moraino
- Montagu Love as Michael Pavloff
- Alexis Kosloff as Nicholas
- Augusta Burmeister as Marta Antonovitch
- Louis R. Grisel as Marta's Husband
- Jack Drumier as Lamoraux
- Johnny Hines as Ivan
- Sidney D'Albrook as Boris

== Bibliography ==
- Richard Koszarski. An Evening's Entertainment: The Age of the Silent Feature Picture, 1915-1928. University of California Press, 1994.
