= The Bachelor's Romance =

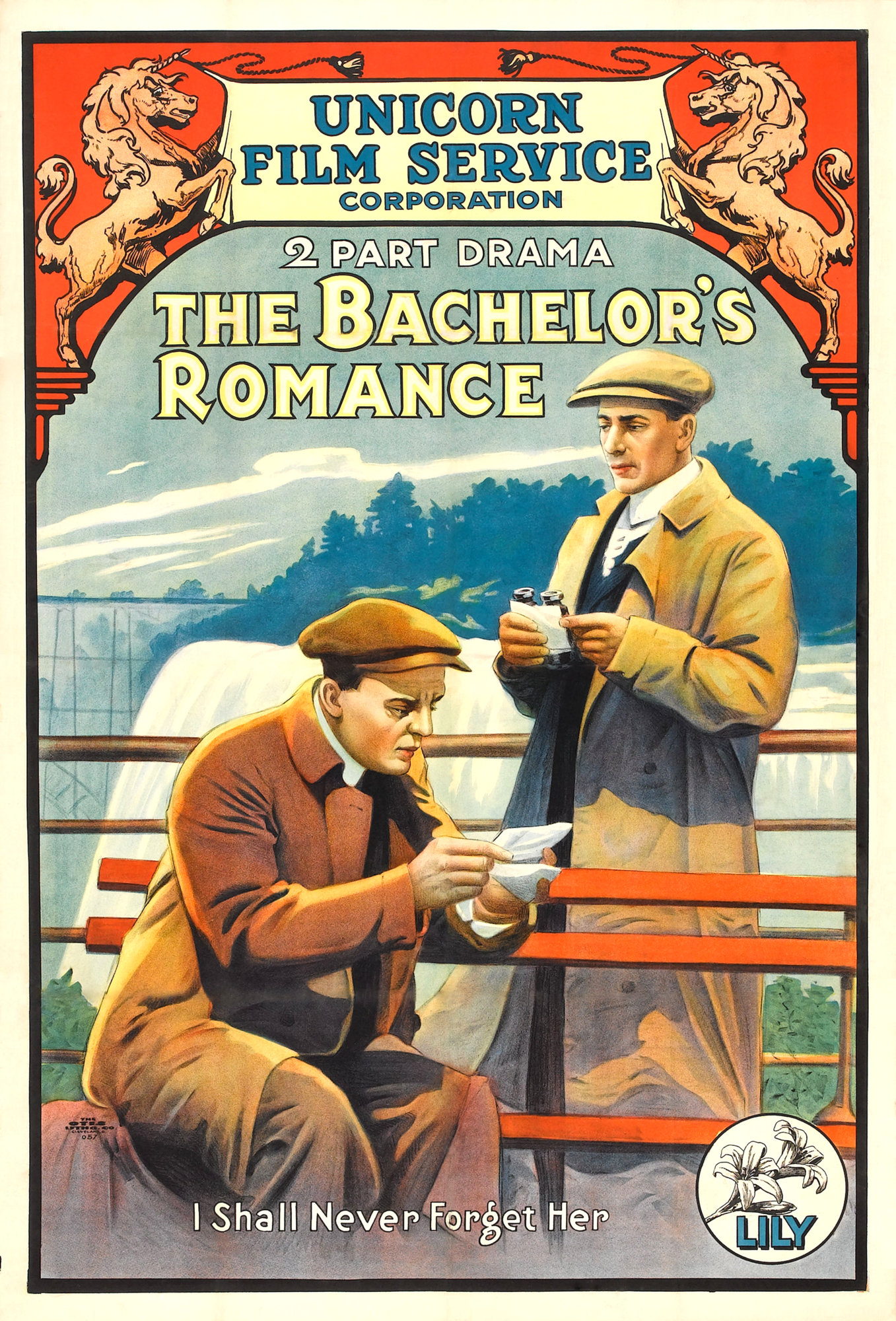
- Unicorn Film Service poster for the film
- Directed by: John Emerson
- Written by: Martha Morton
- Produced by: Daniel Frohman
- Starring: John Emerson; Lorraine Huling; George LeGuere; Robert Cain; Sybilla Pope; Maggie Fisher
- Cinematography: Dal Clawson
- Production company: Famous Players Film Company
- Distributed by: Paramount Pictures
- Release date: February 11, 1915
- Country: United States
- Language: English

The Bachelor's Romance is a 1915 American comedy silent film directed by John Emerson and written by Martha Morton. The film stars John Emerson, Lorraine Huling, George LeGuere, Robert Cain, Sybilla Pope and Maggie Fisher. The film was released on February 11, 1915, by Paramount Pictures.

== Cast ==
- John Emerson as David Holmes
- Lorraine Huling as Sylvia
- George Le Guere as Harry
- Robert Cain as Gerald
- Sybilla Pope as Helen
- Maggie Fisher as Aunt Clem
- Philip Hahn as Savage
- Thomas McGrath as Willum
- J. Findlay as Martin

== Preservation ==
With no holdings located in archives, The Bachelor's Romance is considered a lost film.
