= Arizona (1913 film) =

1913 film directed by Augustus Thomas

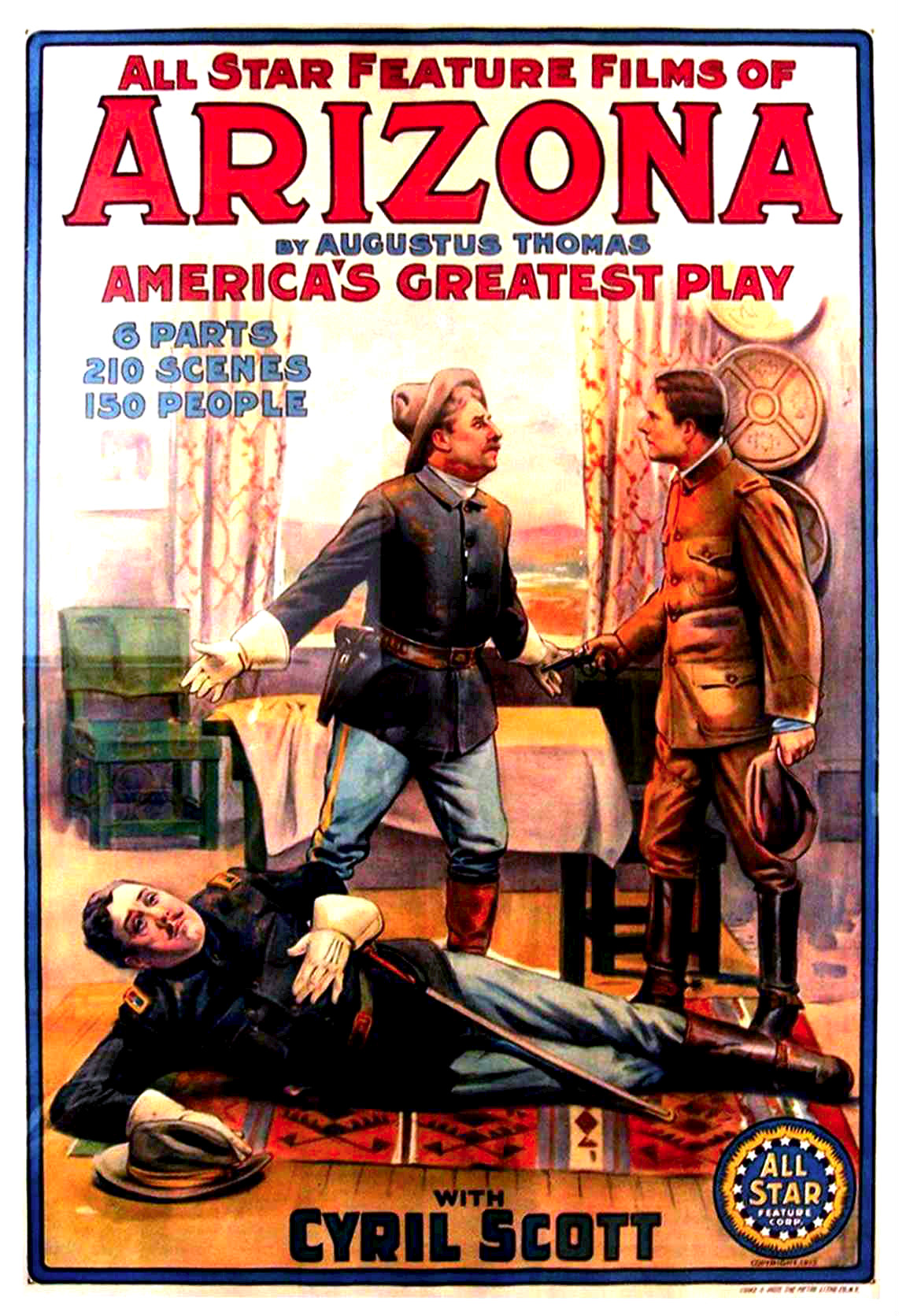
- Film poster
- Directed by: Augustus Thomas; Lawrence B. McGill
- Written by: Augustus Thomas
- Based on: Arizona, a play, by Augustus Thomas
- Produced by: All-Star Feature Corporation
- Starring: Cyril Scott; Gail Kane
- Cinematography: Lucien Tainguy
- Distributed by: State's Rights
- Release date: August 1913
- Running time: 6 reels
- Country: United States
- Languages: Silent; English intertitles

Arizona is a 1913 American silent Western film directed by Augustus Thomas based on his 1899 play Arizona which on stage starred Vincent Serrano and Eleanor Robson. It is one of the first feature films made in the United States, alongside Cleopatra and Richard III. Cyril Scott plays the lead Lt. Denton.

This film is now lost.

== Plot ==
The lead character, Henry Canby, is sent to Arizona as a Captain in the U.S. Cavalry. His superior office has an unfaithful wife. In order to protect the man's reputation, he take the blame for many of the goings on.

== Cast ==
- Robert Broderick – Henry Canby
- Cyril Scott – Lt. Denton
- Gail Kane – Bonita Canby
- William Conklin – Captain Hodgman
- Francis Carlyle – Colonel Bonham
- H. D. Blakemore – Dr. Fenlon
- Alma Bradley – Lena Kellar
- Gertrude Shipman – Estrella Bonham
- Wong Ling – Sam Wong
- Elizabeth McCall – Mrs. Canby
- Charles E. Davenport – Tony Mostano
- Charles E. Graham – Sergeant Kellar

== See also ==
- Arizona (1918)
- Arizona (1931)
