= The First Law (film) =

- Directed by: Lawrence B. McGill
- Starring: Irene Castle
- Production company: Astra Film Company
- Distributed by: Pathé Exchange
- Release date: July 28, 1918
- Running time: 5 reels
- Country: USA
- Language: Silent..English titles

The First Law is an extant 1918 American silent film directed by Lawrence B. McGill and starring Irene Castle. It was distributed through Pathé Exchange.

== Cast ==
- Irene Castle – Norma Webb
- Antonio Moreno – Hugh Godwin
- J. H. Gilmour – Dr. Webb
- Marguerite Snow – Madeleine
- Edward Connelly – Detective

== Preservation status ==
The film survives in the UCLA Film & Television Archive collection.
