= Albert B. Poston =

American educator and politician (1855–1902)

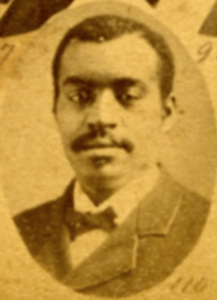

Member of the Mississippi House of Representatives
- In office 1882–1883

Personal details
- Born: January 1855
- Died: 1902 (aged 46–47)
- Spouse: Martha Randolph
- Children: 5
- Profession: Politician, educator, preacher

Albert B. Poston (January 1855 – 1902) was a teacher, principal, preacher, and state legislator in Mississippi. He represented Panola County, Mississippi in the Mississippi House of Representatives in 1882 and 1883.

In 1896, he received votes to be a presidential elector.

He married and had children. He lived in Courtland, Mississippi and Kosciusko, Mississippi.

== See also ==
- African American officeholders from the end of the Civil War until before 1900
