= Metro Pictures =

Defunct American film studio

Metro Pictures Corporation
- Industry: Film studio
- Predecessor: The Oz Film Manufacturing Company (Original)
- Founded: June 23, 1915; 111 years ago
- Founder: Richard A. Rowland; George Grombacker; Louis B. Mayer
- Defunct: April 17, 1924; 102 years ago
- Fate: Merged with Goldwyn Pictures and Louis B. Mayer Pictures to form Metro-Goldwyn-Mayer
- Successors: Studio: Metro-Goldwyn-Mayer; Amazon MGM Studios; Library: Public domain (surviving titles; see copyright law of the United States)
- Headquarters: Heidelberg Building, New York City, United States
- Key people: Richard A. Rowland (President); Louis B. Mayer (secretary)

Metro Pictures Corporation was a motion picture production company founded in early 1915 in Jacksonville, Florida, United States. It was a forerunner of Metro-Goldwyn-Mayer. The company produced its films in New York, Los Angeles, and sometimes at leased facilities in Fort Lee, New Jersey. It was purchased in 1919.

== History ==
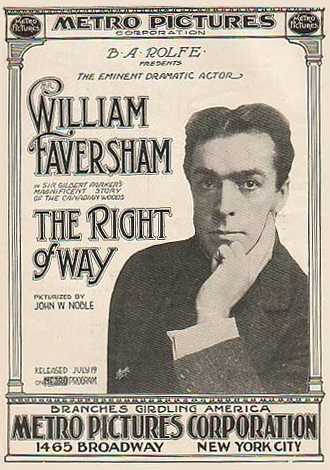
Advertisement for The Right of Way (1915) with William Faversham

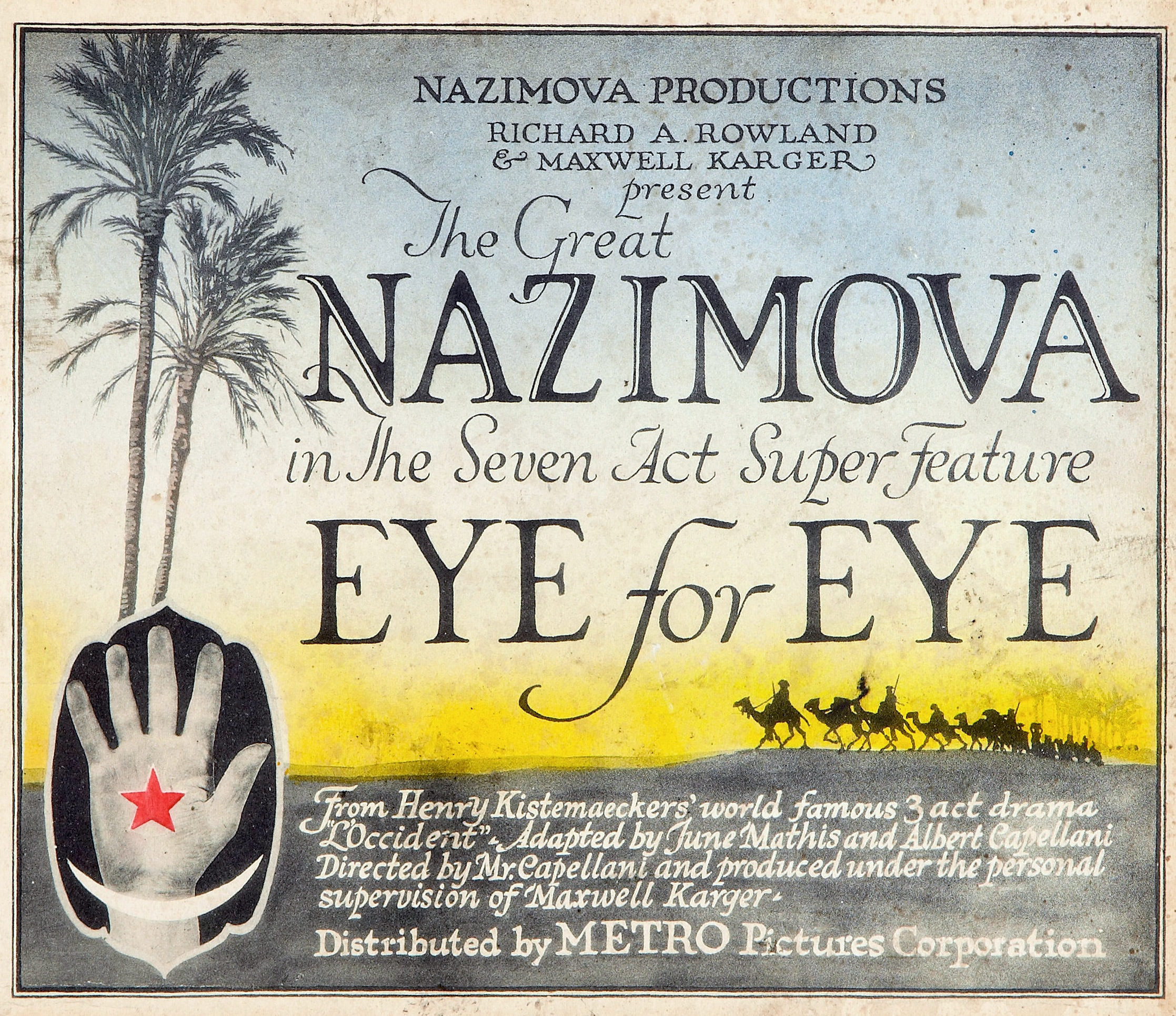
Lobby card for Eye for Eye (1918)

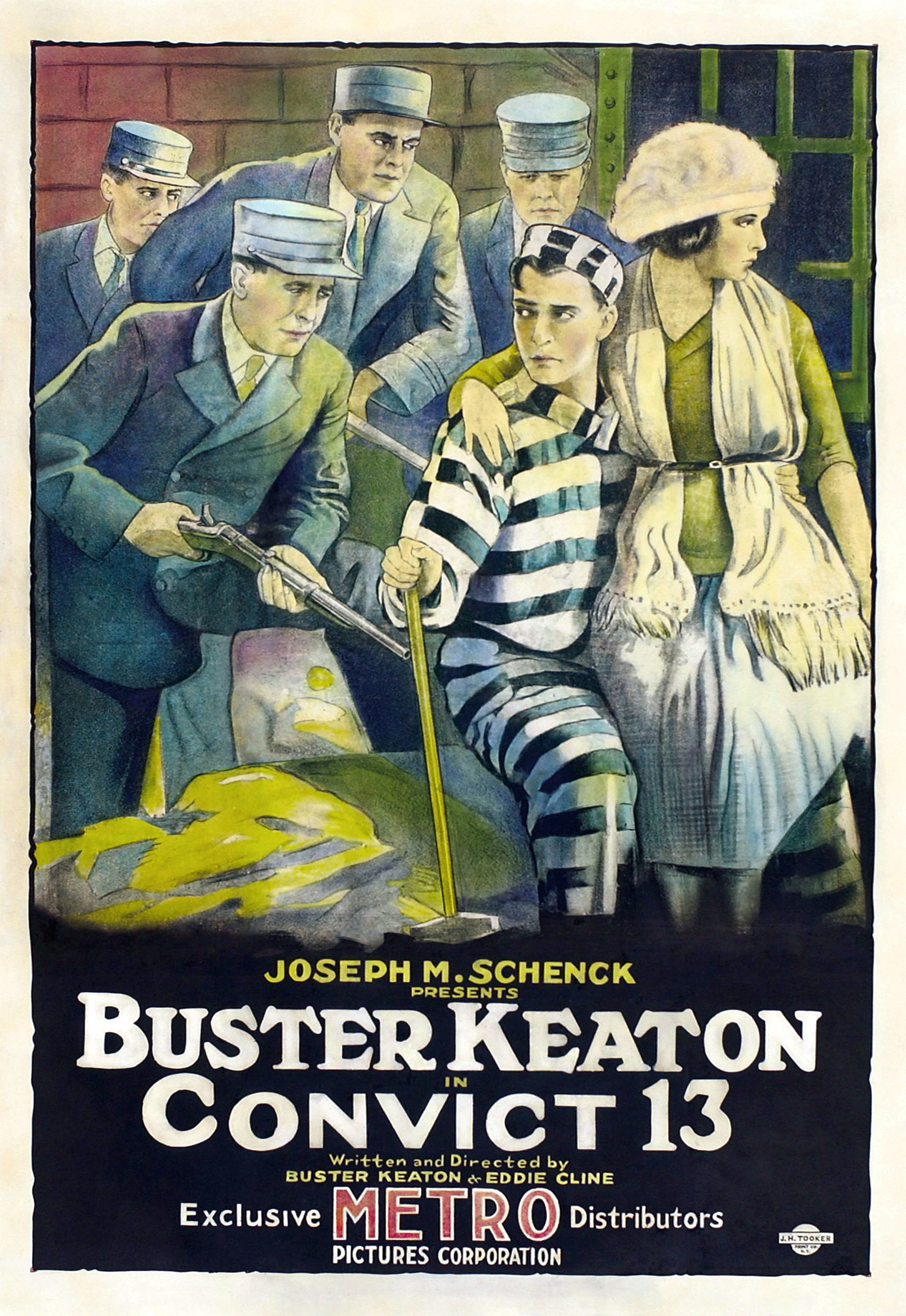
Poster for Convict 13 (1920)

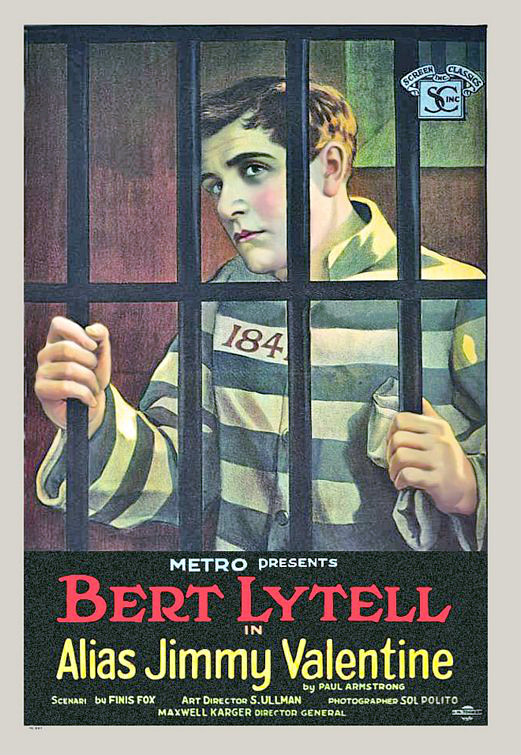
Poster for Alias Jimmy Valentine (1920)

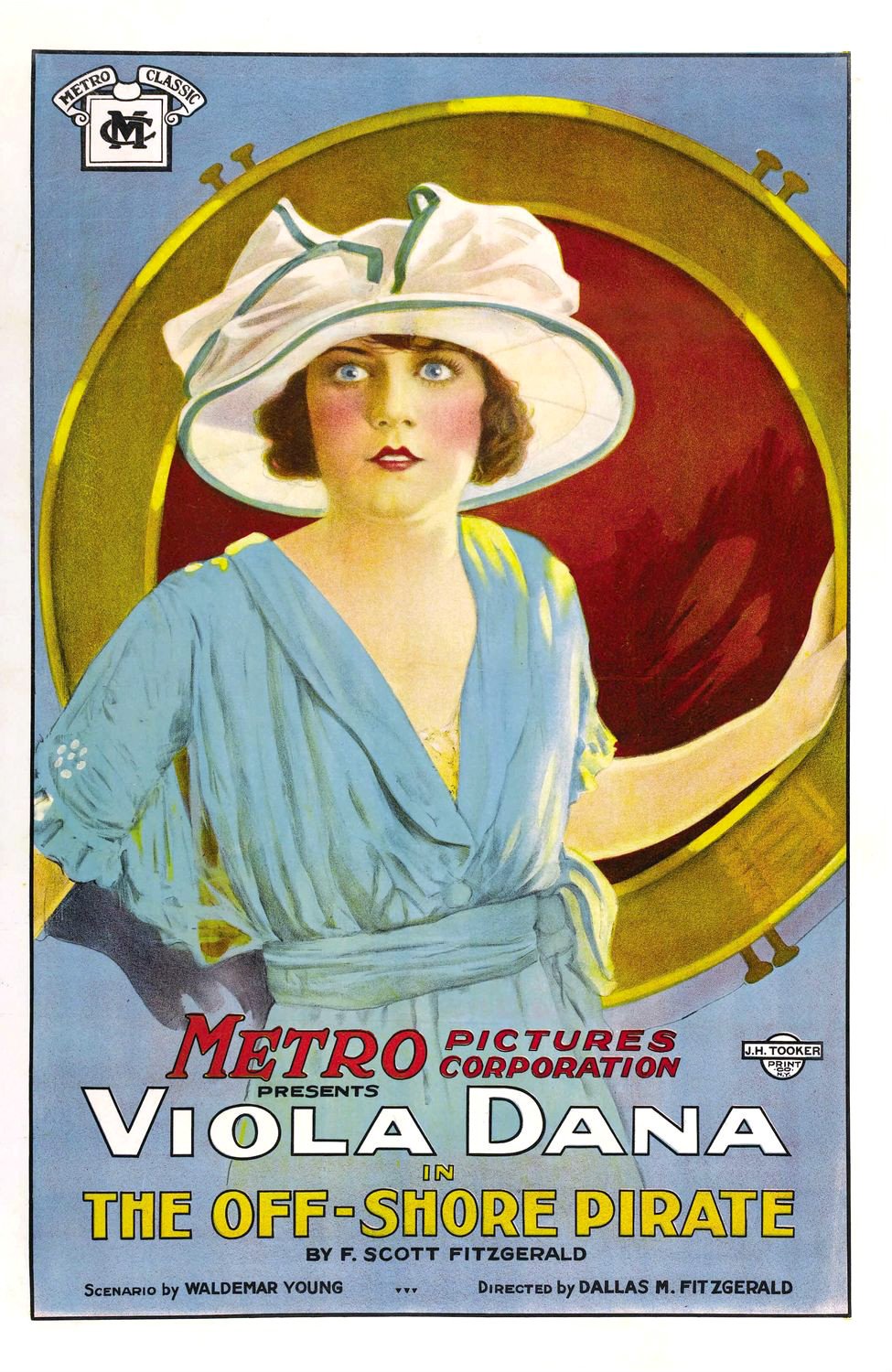
Poster for The Off-Shore Pirate (1921)

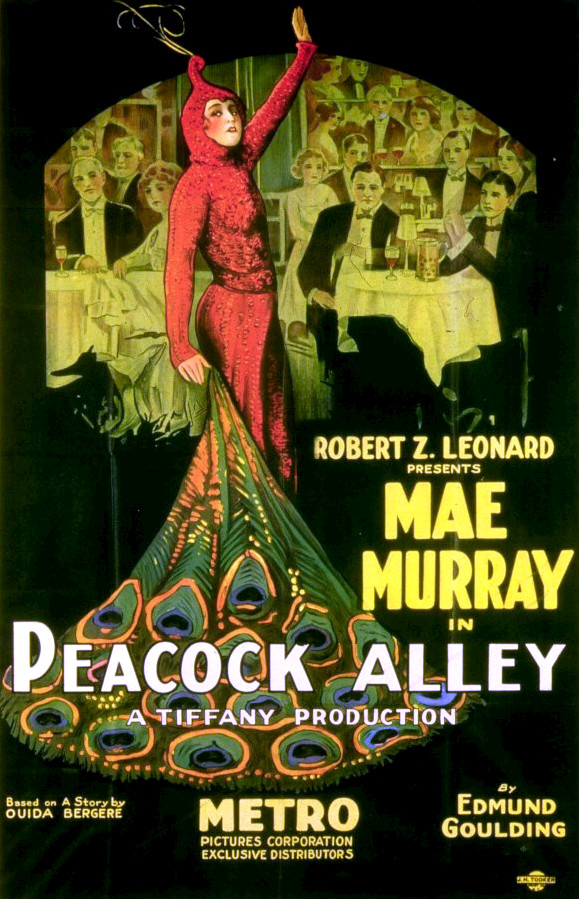
Poster for Peacock Alley (1922)

Metro Pictures was founded as a film distribution company in February 1915 by a number of "exchange men" (exchanges were distribution centers run by Hollywood studios that rented films to movie houses) with Richard A. Rowland as president, George Grombacher as vice-president and Louis B. Mayer as secretary. Grombacher owned exchanges in Portland and Seattle. Rowland and Metro's 2nd vice president James B. Clark were from the Roland & Clark company based in Pittsburgh. Metro was capitalized with $300,000 in cash and founded for the purpose of controlling movie productions for the exchanges. Rowland had been an investor in Alco Films which was a distribution company for a coalition of production companies. Mayer convinced Rowland to set up Metro to replace Alco to avoid being picked up by Paramount, Mutual Film, or Universal. Metro had Rolfe Photoplays, Inc. and Popular Plays and Players moving over from Alco to Metro. Additional production companies working with Metro were Columbia (1915–1917) [not the current Columbia], subsequently CBC Sales until 1918), Quality Picture Corporation, and Dyreda. Mayer left to form his own production unit in 1918.

In 1919, Metro established its Hollywood studio at Lillian Way and Eleanor St. while building its huge studio covering 4 city blocks at Romaine St. and Cahuenga Blvd, which opened in 1920. Its back lot was established in 1920 in Hollywood on N. Cahuenga Boulevard between Willoughby Avenue and Waring Avenue bound by Lillian Way on the east (today home to Red Studios Hollywood).

Metro's first release on March 29, 1915 was Satan Sanderson, a film produced by Rolfe Photoplays which was originally to be distributed by Alco Film Company. Sealed Valley was Metro's first production released on August 2, 1915. William Frederick Jury distributed Metro's films in Britain.

In 1920, the company was purchased by Marcus Loew as a supplier of product for his theater chain. However, Loew was not satisfied with the amount or quality of Metro's output. A few years later in 1924, Loew merged it with the struggling Goldwyn Pictures and shortly Louis B. Mayer Productions then renamed the new entity Metro-Goldwyn-Mayer that year with Mayer in charge (who was never an owner, and was only ever an employee).

== Stars ==
Metro's biggest stars during the World War I period were the romantic teams of Francis X. Bushman and Beverly Bayne and Harold Lockwood and May Allison. Also in top echelons of importance were actresses Mae Murray and Viola Dana and from the stage Lionel and Ethel Barrymore, Emmy Wehlen and Emily Stevens. Before merging into MGM in 1924, Metro's star roster had expanded to include Lillian Gish, Buster Keaton, Jackie Coogan, Marion Davies, Ramon Novarro, Wallace Beery and Lewis Stone.

== Motion Picture Studios ==
Although the Metro film library and stars were merged into MGM in 1924, a portion of Rowland's Los Angeles film studio continued with a life of its own. Originally spanning four city blocks, one block continued as a studio known simply as Motion Picture Studios through the 1940s, Desilu Studios through the 1950s and 1960s. It became Ren-Mar Studios in 1974. In January 2010, Ren-Mar Studios was bought by Red Digital Cinema Camera Company. The complex was renamed "Red Studios Hollywood". It is located on Cahuenga Blvd. north of Melrose Avenue in Hollywood, directly behind the Musicians AFM Local 47 on Vine Street.

David E. Kelley filmed several of his TV series there, including Picket Fences, Ally McBeal, and The Practice.

== Filmography ==
A 1965 fire in an MGM Archive #7 storage facility destroyed original negatives and prints, including the best-quality copies of every Metro picture and Louis B. Mayer Picture produced prior to 1924; over half of MGM's feature films from before 1930 are completely lost. On March 25, 1986, Ted Turner and his Turner Broadcasting System purchased the pre-May 1986 MGM films (including Metro Pictures films) from Kirk Kerkorian for $600 million.

Filmed in Fort Lee, NJ

- The Eternal Question (1916) Olga Petrova
- The Divorcée (1919) Ethel Barrymore
- What People Will Say? (1915) directed by Alice Guy Blache
- Sealed Valley (1915) Dorothy Donnelly
