= The Woman's Law =

1916 drama film

- Directed by: Lawrence B. McGill
- Written by: Albert S. Le Vino (scenario); Harvey F. Thew (scenario)
- Produced by: Arrow Film Corporation (as Gold Rooster Plays)
- Starring: Florence Reed
- Cinematography: Eugene Cugnet
- Distributed by: Pathé Exchange
- Release date: March 21, 1916
- Running time: 5 reels
- Country: United States
- Language: Silent (English intertitles)

The Woman's Law is a lost 1916 American silent drama film directed by Lawrence B. McGill and starring Florence Reed. It was distributed through Pathé Exchange.

== Cast ==
- Florence Reed as Gail Orcutt
- Duncan McRae as George Orcutt / Keith Edgerton
- Anita d'Este Scott as Mrs. Lorme, Gail's Friend
- Jack Curtis as Vance Orcutt (credited as Master Jack Curtis)
- Lora Rogers as Vance's Governess
- John Webb Dillon as John Kent
- William A. Williams as Frank Fisher
- Philip Hahn as Lucas Emmet
