= The Price He Paid =

1914 silent film directed by Lawrence McGill

- Directed by: Lawrence McGill
- Based on: the poem, "The Price He Paid" by Ella Wheeler Wilcox
- Starring: Philip Hahn; Gertrude Shipman; Julia Hurley
- Production company: Humanology Film Producing Co.
- Distributed by: United Film Service
- Release date: December 7, 1914 (US)
- Running time: 5 reels
- Country: United States
- Language: English

The Price He Paid is a 1914 American silent melodrama film, directed by Lawrence McGill. It stars Philip Hahn, Gertrude Shipman, and Julia Hurley, and was released on December 7, 1914. The film was inspired by the Ella Wheeler Wilcox poem of the same name.

== Plot ==
This film depicts the evolution of a man as he betrays all of the people he knows, eventually dying from syphilis in a padded cell.

== Cast list ==
- Philip Hahn as Richard
- Gertrude Shipman as Lucie, his wife
- Julia Hurley as Granny
- Edith Hinkle as Mrs. Lyons
- Reeva Greenwood as Patrice
- Jack Standing as The doctor
- Thomas V. Emery as Charlie Duke
