= George Le Guere =

American actor

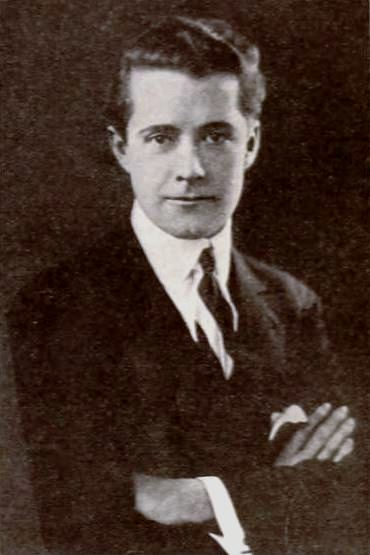
- Le Guere in 1917
- Born: George Le Guere Mullally; July 17, 1881; Memphis, Tennessee
- Died: November 21, 1947 (aged 66); New York City, New York
- Occupation: Actor
- Years active: 1906–1934

George Le Guere (born George Le Guere Mullally; July 17, 1881 – November 21, 1947) was an American stage and screen actor, he was sometimes credited as George LeGuere.

== Biography ==
Le Guere was a graduate of Georgetown University and later worked for the Thanhouser Company. He appeared on Broadway (employed at one time by David Belasco Theatre) while balancing a silent film career. In his youth he stood out having wavy blond hair.

== Selected filmography ==
- The Bachelor's Romance (1915)
- The Commuters (1915)
- The Blindness of Virtue (1915)
- Destiny: Or, The Soul of a Woman (1915)
- The Turmoil (1916)
- The Evil Thereof (1916)
- Pride (1917)
- The Passing of the Third Floor Back (1918) (uncredited; filmed in 1916)
- Cecilia of the Pink Roses (1918)
- The Woman the Germans Shot (1918)
- The Birth of a Race (1918)
- The Way of a Woman (1919)
- Missing Millions (1920)
- Mama's Affair (1921)
- The Dancing Town (1928)
- Men Without Women (1930)
