= Cyril Scott (actor) =

Irish-American actor

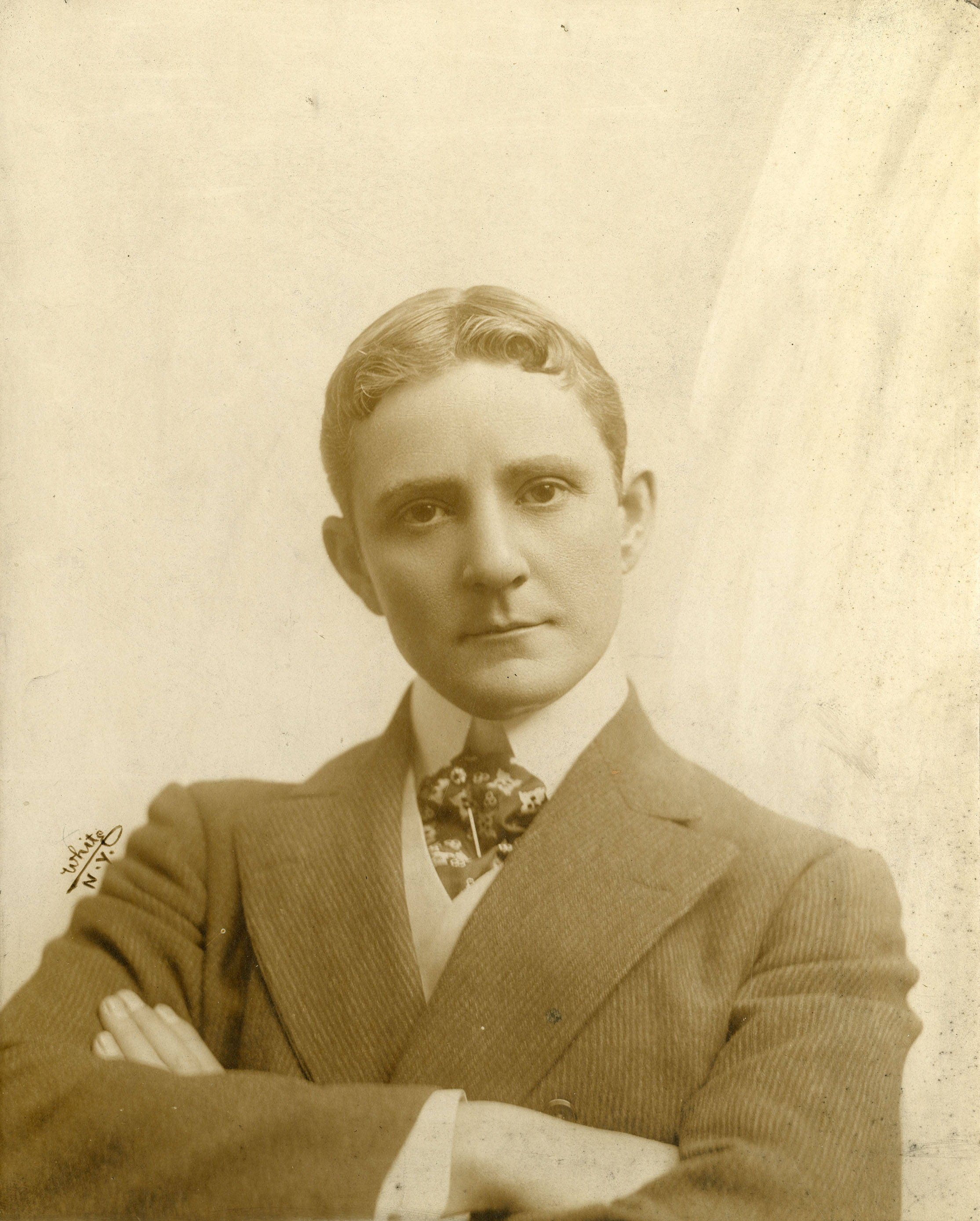
- Born: February 9, 1866; Banbridge, County Down, Ireland
- Died: August 16, 1945 (aged 79); Flushing, Queens, New York, US
- Occupation: Actor
- Years active: 1883–1936
- Spouse: Louise Eissing (??-1921; her death)

Cyril Scott (February 9, 1866 – August 16, 1945) was an Irish-born stage and film actor who spent most of his career in the United States. Long on the stage, Scott first appeared on stage in the U.S. at Paterson, New Jersey and later appeared in the companies of Mrs. Fiske, Lotta Crabtree and Richard Mansfield. In 1900 he appeared in The Casino Girl and was in musicals with De Wolf Hopper. He entered silent films in 1913, appearing in Augustus Thomas's film adaptation of his play Arizona. He appeared in only a handful of movies before his last in 1932. He was a member of both the Lambs and Players Clubs.

Scott was born in Banbridge, County Down, Ireland, and died in Flushing, Queens, New York City. He was married to comedic actress Louise Eissing until her death by suicide in 1921.

== Filmography ==
- Arizona (1913)
- The Day of Days (1914) short
- Not Guilty (1915)
- How Molly Made Good (1915)
- The Lords of High Decision (1916)
- His Royal Highness (1932)
