= The Embarrassment of Riches (film) =

1918 silent film

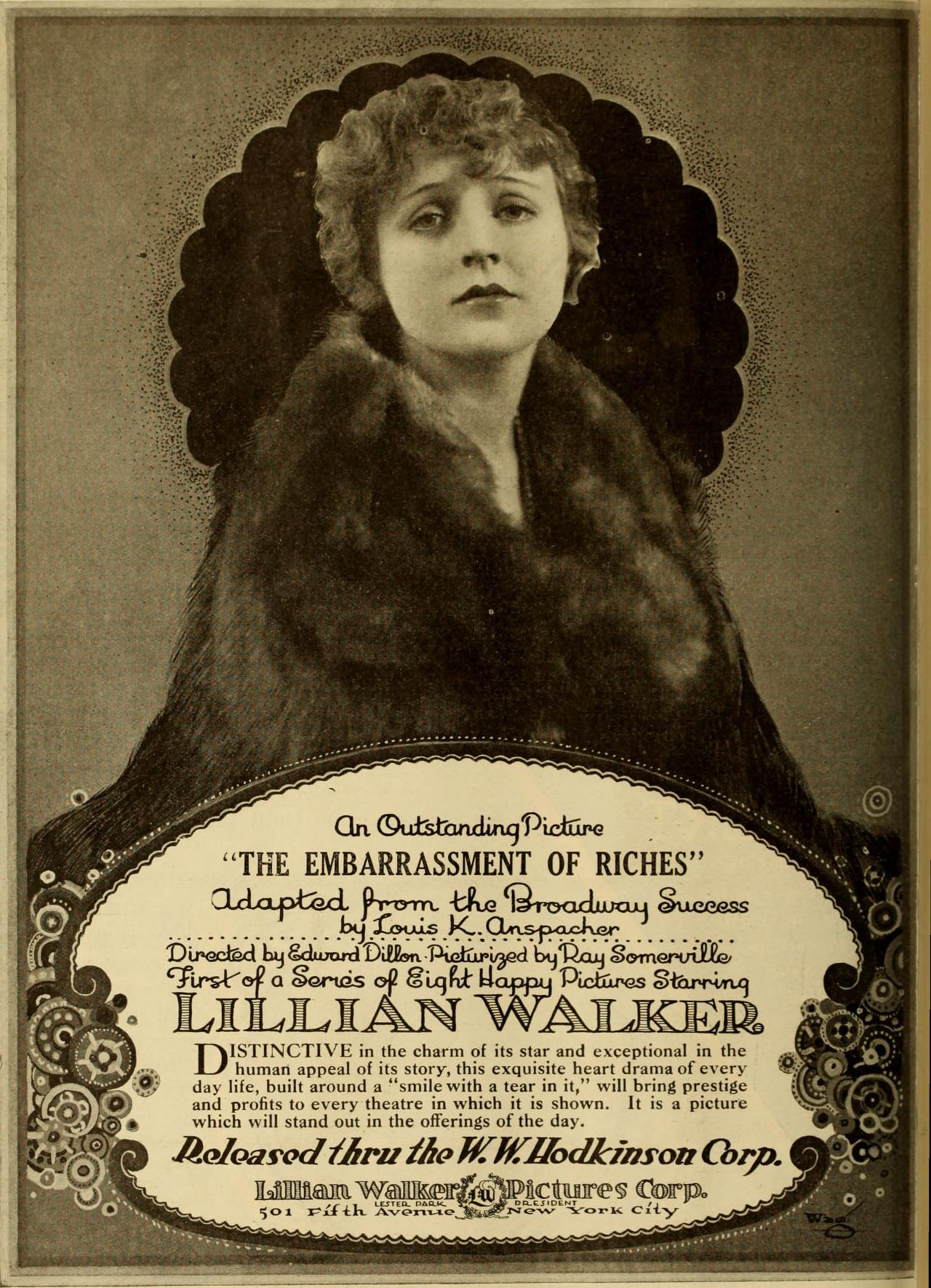
- Directed by: Edward Dillon
- Written by: Louis K. Anspacher (play); Roy Somerville
- Starring: Lillian Walker; Carlton Brickert; John Costello
- Cinematography: Albert Le Guerie
- Production company: Lillian Walker Pictures Corporation
- Distributed by: Hodkinson Pictures
- Release date: September 23, 1918
- Running time: 50 minutes
- Country: United States
- Languages: Silent; English intertitles

The Embarrassment of Riches is a 1918 American silent comedy film directed by Edward Dillon and starring Lillian Walker, Carlton Brickert and John Costello.

== Cast ==
- Lillian Walker as Elizabeth Holt
- Carlton Brickert as John Russell
- John Costello as William Gildersleeve
- Edward Keenan as Bobby Gildersleeve
- Henry Sedley as Count Orloff
- Edward Roseman as Leighton Craig
- Harriet Ross as Mrs. Goodwin
- Reeva Greenwood as Alma Goodwin
- Peggy Lundeen as Miss Partridge
- Howard Truesdale as Ted Phelan
- John T. Dillon as Jim Connors
- William Sloan as Mike

== Reception ==
Variety's review was positive, finding the execution of the story to be interesting and the film to be "extremely pleasing."

== Bibliography ==
- Wakeman, John. World Film Directors: 1890-1945. H.W. Wilson, 1987.
