= Julia Hurley (actress) =

American actress (1848–1927)

Julia R. Hurley
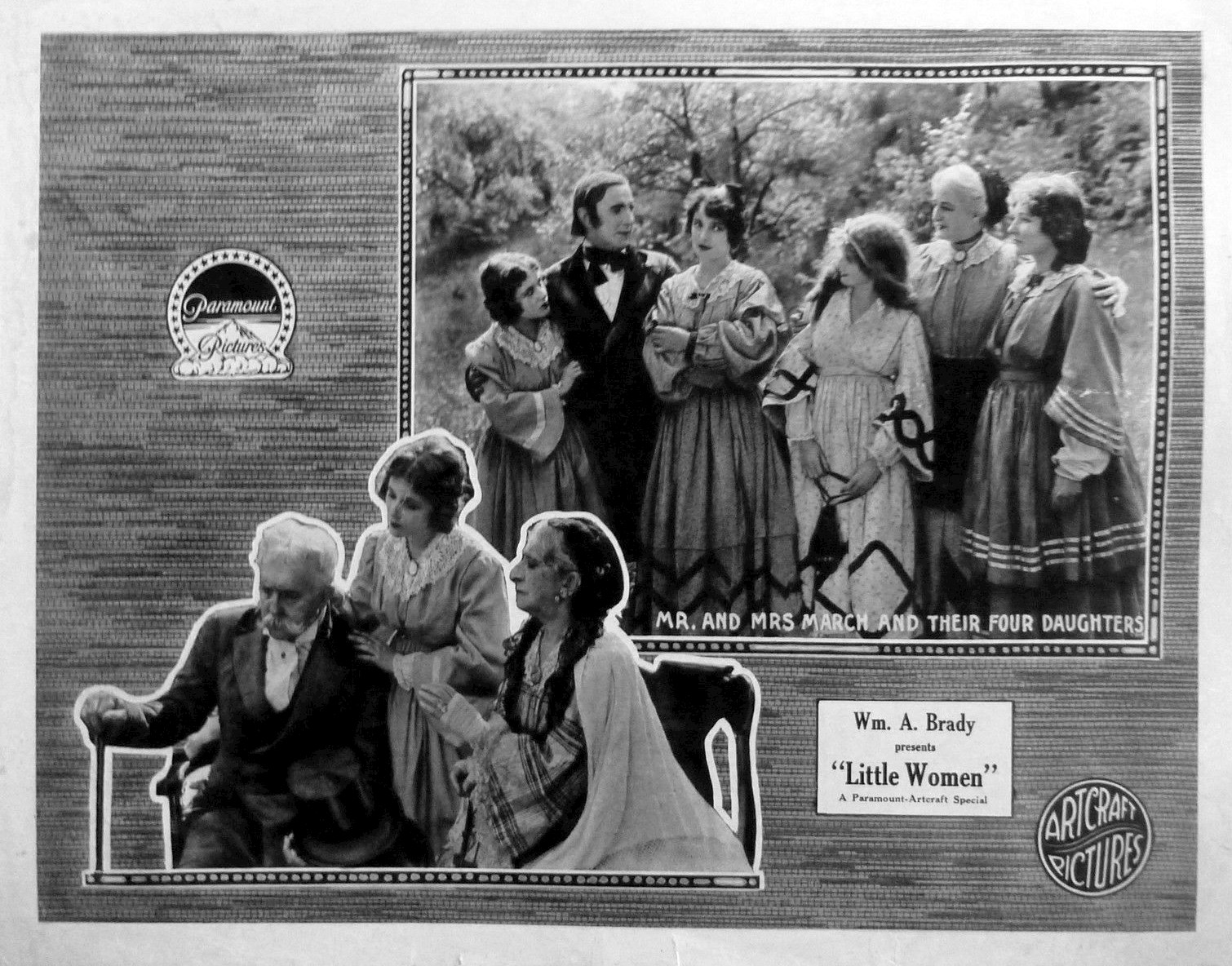
- Hurley (sitting on bench, right) on lobby card for Little Women, 1918.
- Born: May 11, 1848; New York City, U.S.
- Died: June 4, 1927 (aged 79); New York City, U.S.
- Occupation: Actress
- Years active: 1909-1926 (films)

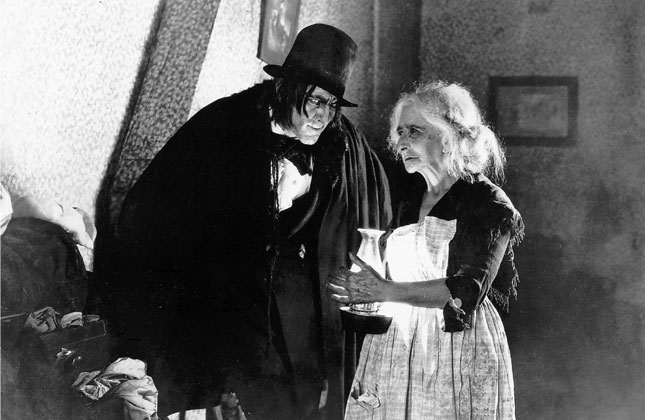
Scene in Dr. Jekyll & Mr. Hyde, 1920, where the landlady(Hurley) is more bemused with Mr. Hyde(Barrymore) rather than afraid of him.

Julia R. Hurley (May 11, 1848 – June 4, 1927) was an American actress who found popularity in her senior years in silent films. She is best remembered today as the 'landlady with the lamp' in the John Barrymore classic Dr. Jekyll and Mr. Hyde 1920, a role for which she is uncredited. This film is her most readily available film today.

Hurley's film debut occurred in Corporal Truman's War Story when she was 63 years old. She worked for many of the early film studios i.e.: Biograph, Kalem, Essanay, Reliance, Imp, Champion and Solax. On Broadway, she portrayed Mrs. Coberg in Blossom Time.

As with most people born in the Victorian era, Hurley probably enjoyed a theatrical career acting in provinces or regional theatre and touring before making her first film in 1909. She continued with films until 1926.

She died June 4, 1927, of chronic myocarditis and nephritis.

== Filmography ==
- The Grandmother (1909) as Mrs. Julia Hurley (short)
- Grandmother (1910) as Mrs Hurley (short)
- Grandma (1911) as Mrs. Hurley (short)
- The Helping Hand (1912) as Mrs. Hurley (short)
- Bedelia's 'At Home' (1912) (short)
- Tempted But True (1912) as Mrs. Hurley (short)
- Mother (1912) (short)
- Sisters (1912) (short)
- The Cuckoo Clock (1912) as Mrs. Hurley (short)
- Guy Mannering (1912) as Mrs. Hurley (short)
- Two Lives (1913) (short)
- Blood and Water (1913)
- A Child's Intuition (1913) as Mrs. Hurley (short)
- Il trovatore (1914)
- The Jungle (1914)
- The Price He Paid (1914)
- The Reformation of Peter and Paul (1915) (short)
- The Melting Pot (1915)
- Her Great Match (1915)
- The Little Gypsy (1915)
- The Ventures of Marguerite (1915) (Serial, Ch. #6)
- The Woman Pays (1915)
- Gold and the Woman (1916)
- The Bondman (1916)
- The Unborn (1916)
- Perils of Our Girl Reporters (1916)
- The Secret of the Storm Country (1917)
- Little Women (1918)
- The Beloved Impostor (1918) as Mrs. Hurley
- The Gold Cure (1919)
- Beware! (1919)
- Mothers of Men (1920)
- Easy to Get (1920)
- The Cost (1920)
- Dr. Jekyll and Mr. Hyde (1920) as Hyde's Landlady (uncredited)
- Guilty of Love (1920)
- A Woman's Man (1920)
- The New York Idea (1920)
- Enchantment (1921)
- Jane Eyre (1921)
- Bride's Play (1922)
- Argentine Love (1924)
- The Little French Girl (1925)
- The Making of O'Malley (1925)
- Married ? (1926)
