= Lawrence B. McGill =

American film director

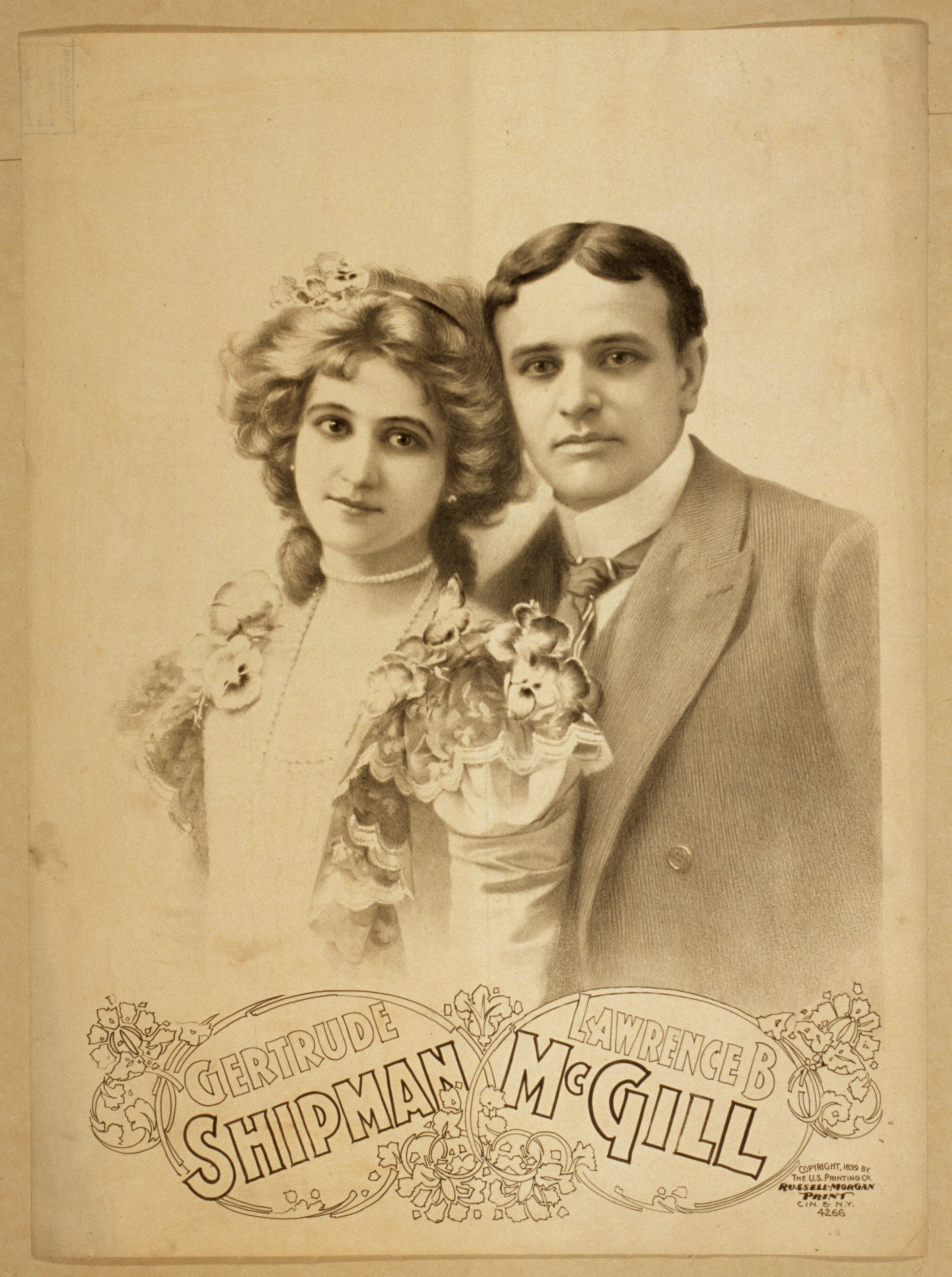
- Lithograph of Gertrude Shipman and Lawrence B. McGill
- Born: Lawrence Barrett McGill; February 22, 1866; Courtland, Mississippi
- Died: February 22, 1928 (aged 62); Waldo, Florida
- Occupations: actor and stage and film director

Lawrence B. McGill (1866–1928) was an American actor and director. At the turn of the 20th century, he was a leading man for Keystone Dramatic Company. He produced stage plays and then went on to act and direct films. He also worked for the New York Reliance-Mutual Company.

== Career ==
Lawrence McGill was a director, writer, and actor. McGill and Gertrude Shipman played a "dandy repertoire of plays" for Keystone Dramatic Company in opera houses across Ohio, Pennsylvania and New Jersey starting by November 1899. In 1909, McGill began producing plays, with Gertrude as the leading lady and Richard Gordon her new leading man, at the Lyric Theater in Buffalo, New York. They opened with Dorothy Hernan of Haddon Hall, an Elizabethan period piece. Shipman operated the Gertrude Shipman and Associated Players for other plays for McGill's production.

McGill acted in and produced silent films between 1909 and 1918. He was the director-in-chief of All-Star Company in 1913. He produced Arizona that year and other previous films. He was on the board of governors of the New York Screen Club. Actor George Brott featured in two films produced by McGill, The Deserted Wife and Love's Young Dream, by 1925. He was brought on as a director at Champion Productions. He also worked for the New York Reliance-Mutual Company.

== Personal life ==
Lawrence Barrett McGill born on February 22, 1866, in Courtland, Mississippi, where he grew up. He was the son of Iona A. Trantham and Archibald D. McGill. He was married twice, first to Elizabeth Amann, with whom they had a daughter, Vida Iona McGill who was born on March 19, 1894. (Note: Vida first lived with her paternal grandparents in Mississippi. In 1910, she was living with Shipman's parents, Robert and Elizabeth, in Frankstown, Pennsylvania.)

He married Gertrude Shipman on November 18, 1899, in Maysville, Kentucky at the Central Presbyterian Church. They were both employed by the Kingston Dramatic Company and they were in the town for a production at the opera house. (Note: They performed on the day of their wedding in Maysville, Kentucky.) Shipman and McGill had a son, Edmund Robert McGill, who was born August 18, 1904, in Connecticut. They lived in New Haven, Connecticut in 1909 and were in Waldo, Florida in the 1920s. McGill died on February 22, 1928, in Waldo. Shipman died on February 14, 1960. They are both buried in the Laurel Grove Cemetery in Waldo.

== Filmography ==
- Camille (1912)
- Arizona (1913 film), co-director
- Our Mutual Girl (1914), one of directors
- America
- Pierre of the Plains (1914)
- The Price He Paid (1914)
- Sealed Valley (1915)
- How Molly Made Good (1915)
- The Amazing Mr. Fellman (1915)
- The Woman's Law (1916)
- Crime and Punishment (1917)
- The Angel Factory (1917)
- The First Law (film) (1918)
- The Girl from Bohemia (1918)
- A Woman's Experience (1919), as Nicholas Barrable
