= Pierre of the Plains (1914 film) =

1914 film written by Benjamin S. Kutler

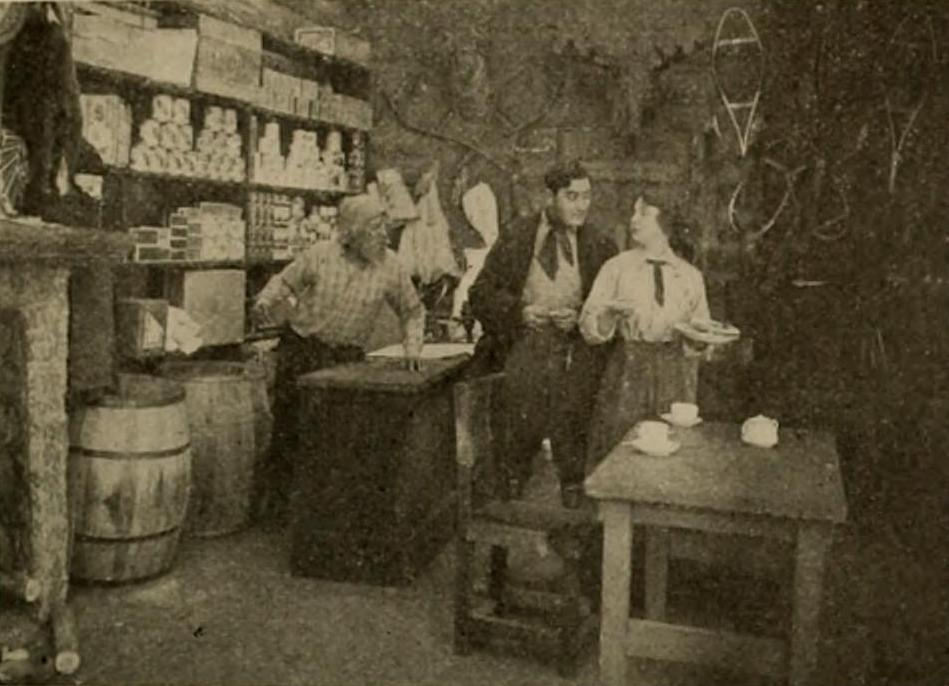
Scene from the film

Pierre of the Plains is a 1914 American silent drama film based on the novel Pierre and his People by Gilbert Parker. Edgar Selwyn adapted the novel into the play Pierre of the Plains in 1908 and it made Elsie Ferguson a Broadway star.

Benjamin S. Kutler wrote the scenario. The film stars Selwyn himself, The supporting cast features Dorothy Dalton, Sydney Seaward, and Lawrence B. McGill.

== Other film adaptations of the novel/play ==
Elsie Ferguson herself appeared in Paramount's version in 1918 under the title Heart of the Wilds, directed by Marshall Neilan. The play was filmed in 1942, again titled Pierre of the Plains.
