= Hazel Felleman =

American editor

- Born: 1884
- Died: April 29, 1975 (aged 90–91); New York City
- Occupation: Editor
- Spouse: Henry Powell (m. 1953, died)
- Writing career
- Notable work: The Best Loved Poems of the American People (1936)

Hazel Felleman (1884 - April 29, 1975 ) was an American editor. She was the editor of New York Times Book Review Notes and Queries for 15 years, until 1955. She edited The Best Loved Poems of the American People (1936) and Poems That Live Forever (1965). Together, the books have sold more than one million copies.

== Life and work ==
Felleman began working at the New York Times in 1905, as a teenager. She started in the Times Tower Building for $10 a week, dusting books. She then progressed to the position of secretary to the editor of The Book Review, until 1944. Alongside her secretarial role, she edited Notes and Queries at the newspaper from 1922. In 1943 she took on this editorial role full time. She was often asked to track down obscure lines from forgotten poems. She used her scores of reference books and her detective skills to winkle out the answers and publish them. "She gained reputation as an obscure‐rhyme detective" and in 1936 published her first anthology of poems. The Best Loved Poems of the American People was printed by Doubleday in the middle of the Great Depression and sold more than 500,000 copies. Felleman wrote in the introduction:

"In the compilation of this book I have drawn on my experience as editor of the Queries and Answers page of the New York Times Book Review over a period of fifteen years. The majority of inquiries that I receive are for favorite poems, and since not a day passes that does not bring to my desk a large sheaf of letters from all parts of the country, it is only natural that I have learned something of the poetry preferences of the American people. I have used this knowledge rather than my own personal liking in the selection of these poems; but I feel free to say that there are few of the poems that I would not have included myself."

Felleman married Lawyer Henry Powell, a lawyer (d.1953). She died on April 30, 1975, at the Beacon Hotel, Broadway at 74th Street, New York. She was survived by grandchildren and great-grandchildren.
