= Reeva Greenwood =

American actress

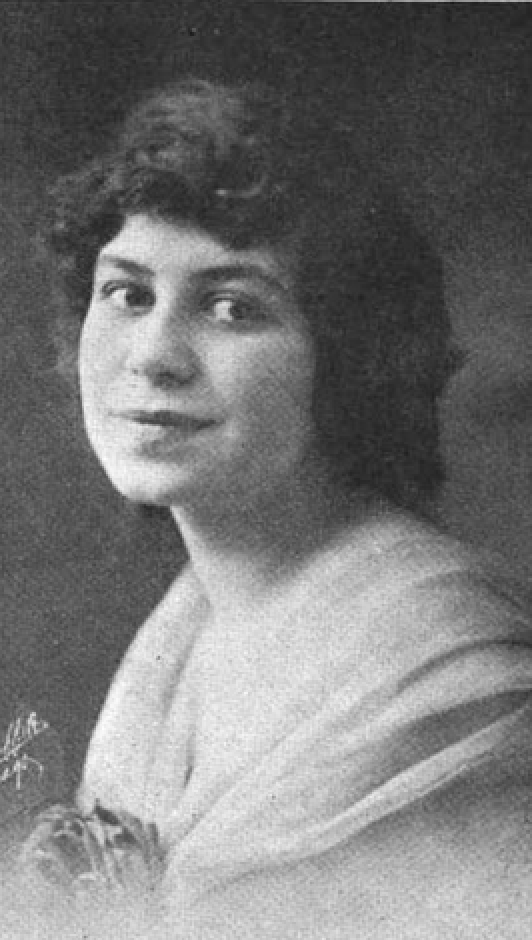
- Reeva Greenwood, from a 1914 publication
- Born: November 1893; Connecticut, U.S.
- Died: May 1st, 1972 (age 78); Florida, U.S.
- Other names: Reva Greenwood, Reeva Pier
- Occupation: Actress

Reeva Greenwood (November 1893 – May 1, 1972) was an American actress on stage and in silent films in the 1910s and 1920s.

== Early life and education ==
Greenwood was born in Connecticut, the daughter of Mai Louise Richardson. Her stepfather was Roland Merrick Greenwood. Early in her life Reeva Greenwood wanted to be a newspaper writer. She stated in a San Francisco Examiner newspaper article written on May 27, 1914, "I have always always had the ambition to become a newspaper writer." She was unsure if she wanted to pursue a career as a journalist or on the stage. Her first opportunity in either field came when she was offered a position working with well-known actors B. H. Sothern and Julia Marlowe, which she felt she could not turn down the offer. This ultimately decided her career path for her. She believed that journalism and acting had similarities.

== Career ==
Greenwood was a member of the Savoy Stock Company. She appeared in several silent films as well as plays while being an employee of the Savoy Stock Company. She toured nationally in Excuse Me (1912–1913), The Road to Happiness (1913–1914) and The Naughty Wife (1918–1920). She acted on Broadway in The Jeweled Tree (1926), which she also produced. Burns Mantle called The Jeweled Tree a "sad waste of time and money".

During her career Reeva Greenwood had a scary and dangerous incident. While traveling on a train through Tennessee to perform a show titled Excuse Me (1912–1913), a bullet crashed through the trains window and passed right above her head. She did not suffer any injuries during this scary incident but she was shaken up due to the loud and unexpected gun shot. The stray bullet was believed to be a nearby hunter who missed his target near the train tracks. A local police officer was sent to investigate this incident on the train. The rest of the comedian actors who were also a part of the show jokingly threatened a lawsuit, which resulted in Reeva Greenwood getting candy out of the officer and the rest of the actors to get cigars. Reeva Greenwood ended up performing as Marjorie later in Arkansas while also enjoying the rest of Little Rock.

One of Reeva Greenwood's most famous plays was The Naughty Wife (1918–1920). She played the lead role of the spoiled wife. The wife wants all the attention and affection even at the risk of her husbands own financial, mental, and social harm. She does not get all that she wants and ends up running away from her first husband to find another one who she eventually marries. The writing and acting of the play makes it seem that she is not a bad wife and is innocent in this situation. At the time critics said this show was one of the best comedies they have seen in the past seasons. They claimed that the show had strong acting, comedic elements, and an engaging storyline.

Greenwood was considered pretty, funny, athletic, and a good horsewoman, the last trait especially useful in Western films. Later in life, she ran a dress shop in St. Petersburg, Florida.

== Filmography ==
- Consuming Love; or, St. Valentine's Day in Greenaway Land (1911, short)
- Bertie's Reformation (1911, short)
- Money in the Bank (1911, short)
- The New Cook (1911, short)
- The Kid from the Klondike (1911, short)
- Love and Hatred (1911, short)
- The Price He Paid (1914)
- For the Honor of Bar X (1915)
- Pals First (1917, Play)
- The Embarrassment of Riches (1924)

== Personal life ==
Greenwood married twice. Her first husband was actor Rollin T. Holden Jr.; they divorced. She married her second husband, novelist and Egyptologist Garrett Chatfield Pier, in 1928. Garrett Pier died in 1943, and she died in Pinellas, Florida on May 1, 1972, at the age of 78.
