= Courtland, Mississippi =

- Town
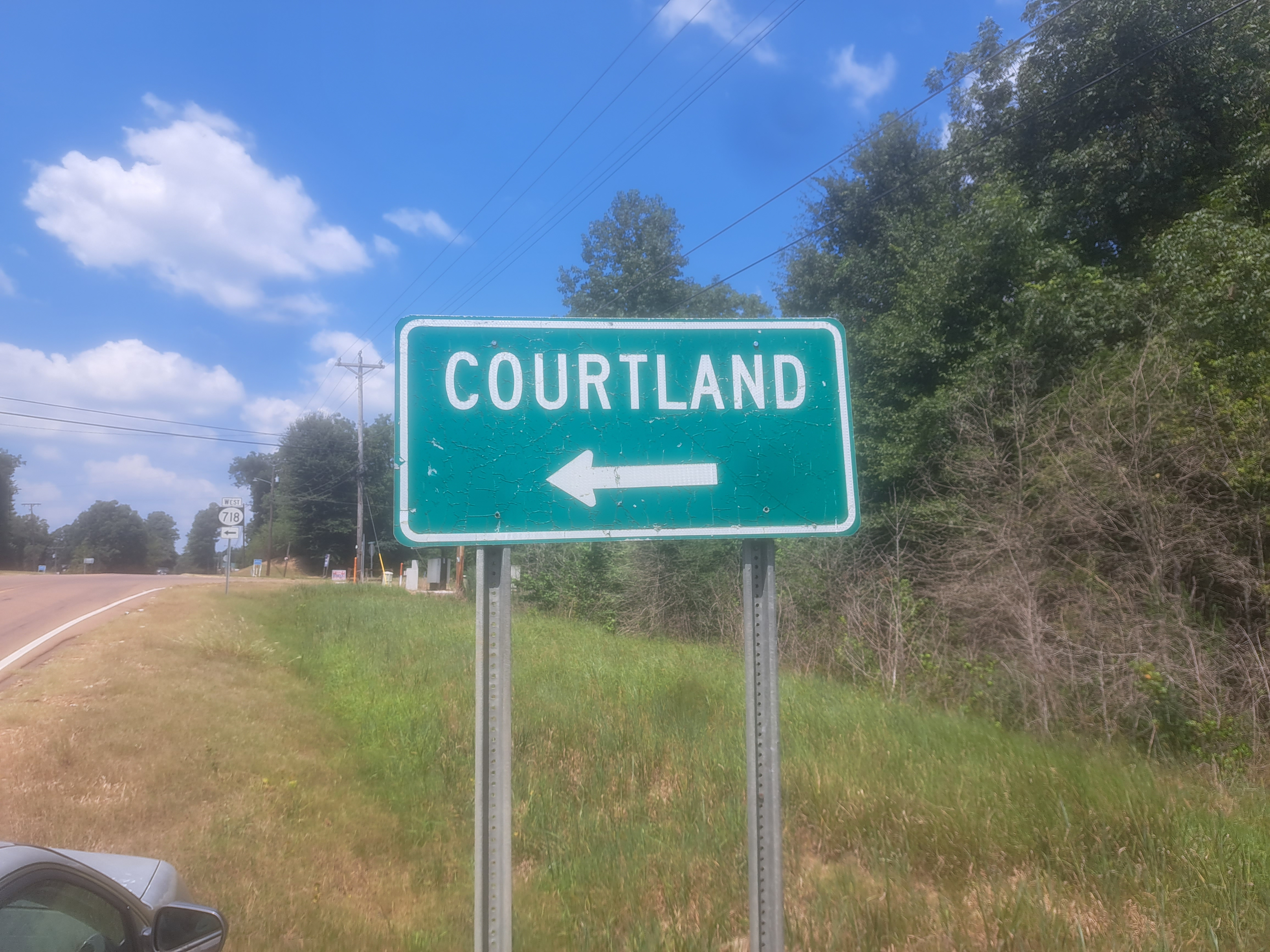
- Highway sign just outside of Courtland

- Location of Courtland, Mississippi

- Location in the United States
- Coordinates: 34°14′28″N 89°56′36″W
- Country: United States
- State: Mississippi
- County: Panola

Area
  - Total: 1.10 sq mi (2.86 km^{2})
  - Land: 1.10 sq mi (2.86 km^{2})
  - Water: 0 sq mi (0.00 km^{2})
- Elevation: 253 ft (77 m)

Population (2020)
  - Total: 470
  - Density: 425.9/sq mi (164.46/km^{2})
- Time zone: UTC-6 (Central (CST))
  - Summer (DST): UTC-5 (CDT)
- ZIP code: 38620
- Area code: 662
- FIPS code: 28-15980
- GNIS feature ID: 2406324

Courtland is a town in Panola County, Mississippi, United States. As of the 2020 census, Courtland had a population of 470.

== History ==
Courtland, Mississippi was incorporated as a town on March 30, 1871. On July 17, 1946, acting Governor Fielding L. Wright issued a proclamation abolishing the town as it had not held a municipal election in over two years. On July 18, the area was reorganized into a village.

== Geography ==
According to the United States Census Bureau, the town has a total area of 1.1 square miles (2.8 km^{2}), all land.

== Demographics ==
Historical population
Census	Pop.	Note	%±
1880	221		—
1900	282		—
1910	304		7.8%
1920	265		−12.8%
1930	230		−13.2%
1940	237		3.0%
1950	275		16.0%
1960	242		−12.0%
1970	316		30.6%
1980	381		20.6%
1990	329		−13.6%
2000	460		39.8%
2010	511		11.1%
2020	470		−8.0%
U.S. Decennial Census

As of the census of 2000, there were 460 people, 157 households, and 127 families residing in the town. The population density was 408.1 inhabitants per square mile (157.6/km^{2}). There were 169 housing units at an average density of 150.0 per square mile (57.9/km^{2}). The racial makeup of the town was 64.57% White and 35.43% African American. Hispanic or Latino of any race were 1.30% of the population.

There were 157 households, out of which 43.3% had children under the age of 18 living with them, 59.9% were married couples living together, 19.1% had a female householder with no husband present, and 18.5% were non-families. 17.8% of all households were made up of individuals, and 6.4% had someone living alone who was 65 years of age or older. The average household size was 2.93 and the average family size was 3.32.

In the town, the population was spread out, with 32.6% under the age of 18, 7.4% from 18 to 24, 30.9% from 25 to 44, 19.3% from 45 to 64, and 9.8% who were 65 years of age or older. The median age was 32 years. For every 100 females, there were 100.0 males. For every 100 females age 18 and over, there were 86.7 males.

The median income for a household in the town was $35,729, and the median income for a family was $38,125. Males had a median income of $32,125 versus $19,375 for females. The per capita income for the town was $17,130. About 12.4% of families and 16.5% of the population were below the poverty line, including 17.4% of those under age 18 and 24.2% of those age 65 or over.

== Education ==
The Town of Courtland is served by the South Panola School District.

== Notable people ==
- Calvin Chapman, MLB infielder and outfielder
- Ed Chapman, MLB pitcher
- Jermarcus Hardrick, gridiron football offensive lineman
- Lawrence B. McGill, actor, director, and writer
- Albert B. Poston, member of the Mississippi House of Representatives from 1882-1883
