= Pierre of the Plains (1942 film) =

1942 film by George B. Seitz

- Directed by: George B. Seitz
- Written by: Gilbert Parker (Pierre and His People); Lawrence Kimble; Bertram Millhauser
- Produced by: Edgar Selwyn
- Starring: John Carroll; Ruth Hussey; Bruce Cabot
- Cinematography: Charles Rosher
- Edited by: George White
- Music by: Lennie Hayton
- Distributed by: Metro-Goldwyn-Mayer
- Release date: 1942
- Running time: 57 minutes
- Country: United States
- Language: English
- Budget: $384,000
- Box office: $427,000

Pierre of the Plains is a 1942 Northern film set in Saskatchewan, Canada, directed by George B. Seitz and starring John Carroll and Ruth Hussey. The supporting cast features Bruce Cabot, Reginald Owen, Henry Travers, Evelyn Ankers and Sheldon Leonard. The movie is a remake of a 1914 version co-written by and starring Edgar Selwyn.

== Plot ==
Pierre (Carroll), a singing French-Canadian trapper, acts as a non-commissioned law enforcement officer, punishing traveling salesman Clerou (Leonard) for "selling whiskey to Indians." When his intrusive nature gets him into trouble with the Royal Canadian Mounted Police, he is brought to the station. In order to avoid incarceration, he claims that he is engaged to be married to the lovely Daisy Denton (Hussey), a popular barmaid who runs the local saloon, but who is actually engaged to "Jap" Durkin (Cabot).

After Pierre's shrewd planning destroys the possibly of a marriage to Daisy, Durkin vows revenge. Meanwhile, Pierre spends his time romancing Daisy and simultaneously getting into scrapes with the mounties. While riding horseback en route to town and back to his rural campsite, he often breaks into the song "Saskatchewan."

Daisy's brother Val (Brown) shoots "Clerou" and is placed under arrest by Durkin. Through mutual conspiring on the part of Pierre and Daisy, they manage to help Val escape from jail, where the four of them hideout at Pierre's rural campsite. Durkin finds them and confronts Pierre, resulting in a gunfire battle that kills Durkin. After a very brief investigation, Pierre marries Daisy and rides off for their honeymoon, singing "Saskatchewan."

== Production ==
The railroad scene was filmed on the Sierra Railroad in Tuolumne County, California.

== Reception ==
According to MGM records, the film earned $289,000 in the US and Canada and $138,000 elsewhere, costing the studio a loss of $111,000.
