= Seven Keys to Baldpate =

Seven Keys to Baldpate may refer to:

- Seven Keys to Baldpate, a novel by Earl Derr Biggers
- Seven Keys to Baldpate (play), a 1913 play by George M. Cohan based on the novel
- Seven Keys to Baldpate (1916 film), a 1916 Australian silent film
- Seven Keys to Baldpate (1917 film), a 1917 American silent mystery/thriller film
- Seven Keys to Baldpate (1925 film), a lost 1925 silent film
- Seven Keys to Baldpate (1929 film), a 1929 sound film
- Seven Keys to Baldpate (1935 film), a 1935 film based on the play
- Seven Keys to Baldpate (1947 film), a 1947 film based on the play
