= Seven Keys to Baldpate (novel) =

1913 novel by Earl Derr Biggers

First edition, Bobbs-Merrill & Co., 1913

Seven Keys to Baldpate is a 1913 novel by Earl Derr Biggers. A bestseller, it was adapted by George M. Cohan into a play, which in turn was adapted several times for film, radio and TV.

The novel concerns a writer named Billy Magee, who tries to escape the city and stay at the quiet Baldpate Inn to get some inspiration for his next novel; however, he discovers that six other people have keys to the inn and he gets embroiled in their lives with incidences of bribery, punch-ups and gunfire.

The plot of the novel differs from the play in many respects.

The setting was based on the real Baldpate Mountain. An American hotel inspired by that name, The Baldpate Inn, opened in 1918.

== Adaptations ==
The play adapted by George M. Cohan in 1913 was subsequently filmed and broadcast on radio and TV several times:

- Seven Keys to Baldpate (1916 film), from Australia
- Seven Keys to Baldpate (1917 film) starring Cohan himself
- Seven Keys to Baldpate (1925 film) with Douglas MacLean
- Seven Keys to Baldpate (1929 film) with Richard Dix
- Seven Keys to Baldpate (1935 film) with Gene Raymond
- Seven Keys to Baldpate (1947 film) with Phillip Terry
- House of the Long Shadows (1983)

Radio adaptations:

- 1938 for Lux Radio Theatre with Jack Benny
- 1946 for Theatre Guild on the Air with Walter Pidgeon

== Theatre adaptation ==
- Victoria Theatre, Singapore, 1946. Kenneth Williams stage début.

== Television ==
Adaptations were made in 1946 and 1961.
