= The Parson of Panamint (1941 film) =

1941 film by William C. McGann

- Theatrical release poster
- Directed by: William C. McGann
- Written by: Adrian Scott; Harold Shumate
- Produced by: Harry Sherman
- Starring: Charlie Ruggles; Ellen Drew; Phillip Terry; Joseph Schildkraut; Porter Hall; Henry Kolker
- Cinematography: Russell Harlan
- Edited by: Carroll Lewis; Sherman A. Rose
- Music by: John Leipold
- Production company: Paramount Pictures
- Distributed by: Paramount Pictures
- Release date: July 25, 1941
- Running time: 84 minutes
- Country: United States
- Language: English

The Parson of Panamint is a 1941 American Western film directed by William C. McGann and written by Adrian Scott and Harold Shumate. The film stars Charlie Ruggles, Ellen Drew, Phillip Terry, Joseph Schildkraut, Porter Hall and Henry Kolker. The film was released on July 25, 1941, by Paramount Pictures.

== Cast ==
- Charlie Ruggles as Chuckawalla Bill Redfield
- Ellen Drew as Mary Mallory
- Phillip Terry as Rev. Philip Pharo
- Joseph Schildkraut as Bob Deming
- Porter Hall as Jonathan Randall
- Henry Kolker as Judge Arnold Mason
- Janet Beecher as Mrs. Tweedy
- Clem Bevans as Crabapple Jones
- Douglas Fowley as Chappie Ellerton
- Paul Hurst as Jake Waldren
- Frank Puglia as Joaquin Fuentes
- Minor Watson as Sheriff Nickerson
- Harry Hayden as Timothy Hadley
- Russell Hicks as Prosecuting Attorney
