= Edith Yorke =

English actress

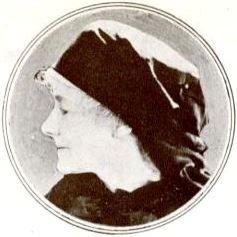
- Yorke in Homespun Folks (1920)
- Born: Edith Murgatroyd; 23 December 1867; Derby, England, UK
- Died: 28 July 1934 (aged 66); Southgate, California, U.S.
- Occupation: Actress
- Years active: 1919–1933
- Spouse: Robert Byard
- Children: 2

Edith Yorke (born Edith Murgatroyd; 23 December 1867 – 28 July 1934) was an English actress. She appeared in more than 60 films from 1919 to 1933.

== Biography ==
Yorke was born in Derby; her family later moved to Croydon. Edith returned to Derby, where she taught destitute children in a local workhouse. She married Robert Byard and emigrated with him and their children to the United States in 1902, becoming a film actress in her 50s, mainly in supporting roles. Her daughter was a film actress also, and her son became a violinist with a symphony orchestra. Yorke died in Southgate, California, aged 66.

== Selected filmography ==
- The False Road (1920)
- Below the Surface (1920)
- The Jailbird (1920)
- Love (1920)
- One Clear Call (1922)
- Step on It! (1922)
- Souls for Sale (1923)
- Slippy McGee (1923)
- Merry-Go-Round (1923)
- The Age of Desire (1923)
- Burning Words (1923)
- The Fourth Musketeer (1923)
- The Miracle Makers (1923)
- The Beauty Prize (1924)
- Happiness (1924)
- Riders Up (1924)
- The Tenth Woman (1924)
- The Other Kind of Love (1924)
- Capital Punishment (1925)
- Excuse Me (1925)
- Silent Sanderson (1925)
- Wild Horse Mesa (1925)
- Souls for Sables (1925)
- Below the Line (1925)
- Seven Keys to Baldpate (1925)
- Red Dice (1926)
- His New York Wife (1926)
- Volcano! (1926)
- The Belle of Broadway (1926)
- Oh! What a Nurse! (1926)
- Rustlers' Ranch (1926)
- Rustling for Cupid (1926)
- The Silent Flyer (1926)
- The Bachelor's Baby (1927)
- Sensation Seekers (1927)
- The Port of Missing Girls (1928)
- The Valiant (1929)
- The Love Racket (1929)
- Fugitives (1929)
- Seven Keys to Baldpate (1929)
- City Girl (1930)
- If I Had a Million (1932, uncredited)
- Luxury Liner (1933)
