= Seven Keys to Baldpate (play) =

1913 play by George M. Cohan

- Original language: English
- Written by: George M. Cohan
- Genre: comedy mystery
- Setting: Office of Baldpate Inn.

Premiere
- Date: 22 September 1913
- Place: Astor Theatre, New York

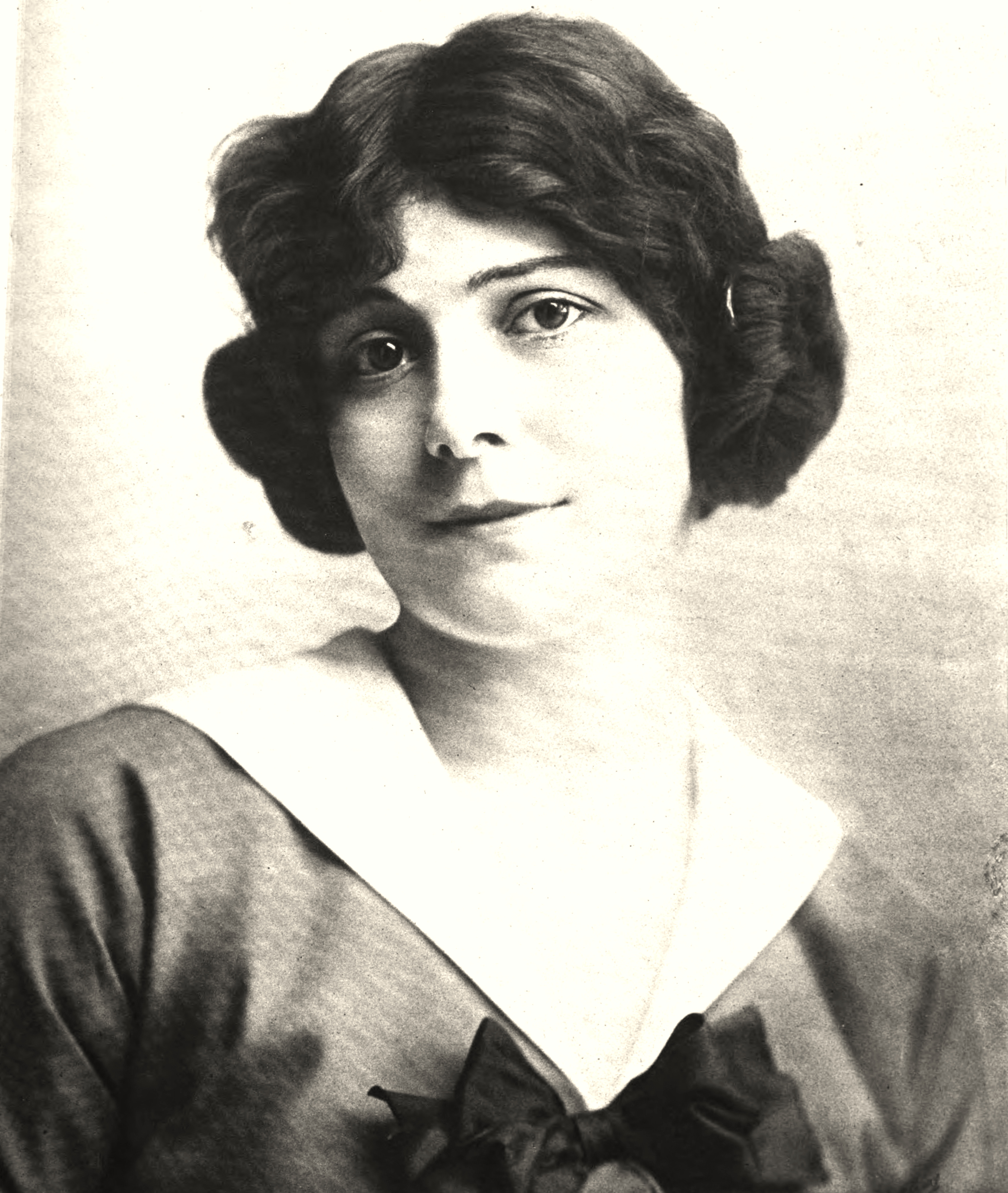

Seven Keys to Baldpate is a 1913 play by George M. Cohan based on a novel by Earl Derr Biggers. The dramatization was one of Cohan's most innovative plays. It baffled some audiences and critics but became a hit, running for nearly a year in New York, another year in Chicago and receiving later revivals; Cohan starred in the 1935 revival. Cohan adapted it as a film in 1917, and it was adapted for film six more times, and later for TV and radio. The play "mixes all the formulaic melodrama of the era with a satirical [farcical] send-up of just those melodramatic stereotypes."

== Synopsis ==
Novelist Billy Magee makes a bet with a wealthy friend that he can write a 10,000 word story within 24 hours. He retires to a summer mountain resort named Baldpate Inn, in the dead of winter, and locks himself in, believing he has the sole key. However he is visited during the night by a rapid succession of other people (melodrama stock types), including a corrupt politician, a crooked cop, a hermit, a feisty girl reporter, a gang of criminals, etc., none of whom have any trouble getting into the remote inn—there appear to be seven keys to Baldpate.

Magee gets no work done, instead being drawn into the hijinks of the other visitors. He eventually foils a plot by the crooks to steal money from the hotel safe that is earmarked for a city street railroad deal, and he falls in love with the reporter. He observes derisively that all of these complicated incidents and characters are ones that he has written over and over again. Just before midnight, he finds out that everyone is an actor hired to perpetrate a hoax, orchestrated by Magee's friend to keep him from completing the story.

In the epilogue, the inn is empty, and a typewriter is clattering upstairs: Magee has finished his story before midnight and won the bet. He reveals that nothing had happened during the 24 hours; all the preceding melodrama, including the actors and hoax, constitute the story.

== Characters ==
- Elijah Quimby, the caretaker of Baldpate Inn – Edgar Halstead
- Mrs. Quimby, the caretaker's wife – Jessie Grahame
- William Hallowell Magee, the novelist – Wallace Eddinger
- John Bland, the millionaire's right-hand man – Purnell Pratt
- Mary Norton, the newspaper reporter – Margaret Greene
- Mrs. Rhodes, the charming widow – Lorena Atwood
- Peter, the Hermit of Baldpate – Joseph Allen
- Myra Thornhill, the blackmailer – Gail Kane
- Lou Max, the mayor's man "Friday" – Roy Fairchild
- Jim Cargan, the crooked mayor of Reuton – Martin Alsop
- Thomas Hayden, the president of the R. and E. Suburban R.R. – Claude Brooke
- Jiggs Kennedy, Chief of Police of Asquewan Falls – Carlton Macy
- The Owner of the Baldpate Inn, Magee's friend – John C. King

== Reception ==
The play premiered on Broadway on September 22, 1913 at the Astor Theatre and ran for 320 performances. The New York Times drama critic called it "melodrama of the good, old-fashioned sort".

Cohan and his daughter were severely injured in a car crash during rehearsal of the original production.

Although a 1935 revival, starring Cohan in the lead, was less successful, running only a week, it remains Cohan's most popular play.

== Adaptations ==
The play was filmed several times, with versions appearing in 1916 (from Australia), 1917 (starring Cohan himself), 1925 (with Douglas MacLean), 1929 (with Richard Dix), 1935 (with Gene Raymond), 1947 (with Phillip Terry), and 1983 (as House of the Long Shadows). Television adaptations appeared in 1946 and 1961.

The play was also adapted for radio in 1938 (for Lux Radio Theatre with Jack Benny) and 1946 (for Theatre Guild on the Air with Walter Pidgeon).
