= Seven Keys Lodge =

Historic hotel in Estes Park, Colorado, U.S.

Seven Keys Lodge (formerly known as The Baldpate Inn) is a historic hotel located in Estes Park, Colorado. It has designations on the National Register of Historic Places and the Colorado State Register of Historic Properties. The property has changed hands several times, always under a private family's proprietorship. In 2020, the property was purchased and the new owners changed the name to the Seven Keys Lodge.

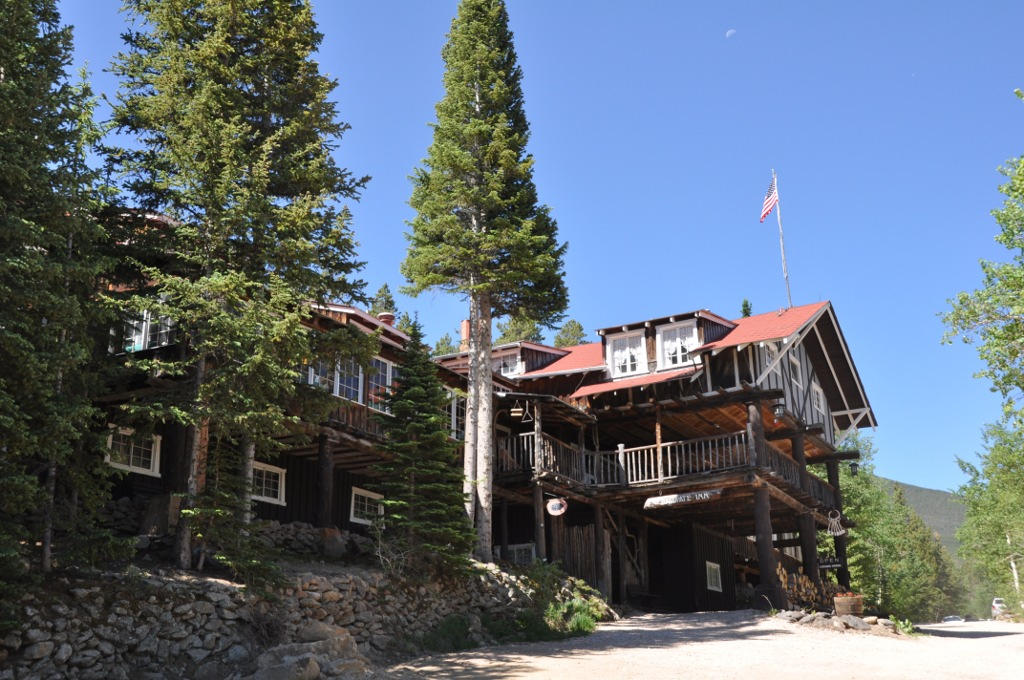
Exterior of the Seven Keys Lodge, 2012

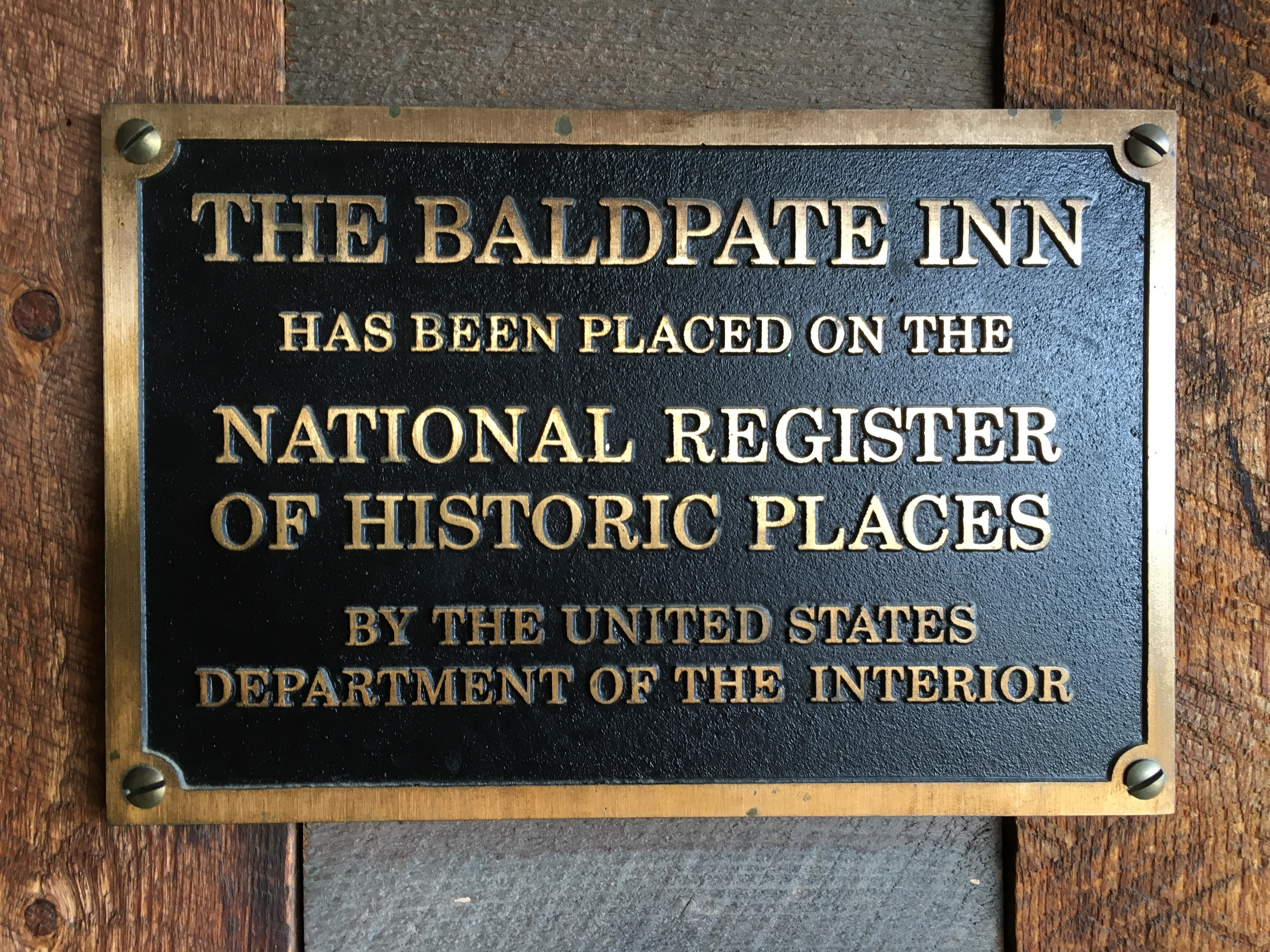
National Register of Historic Places, metal plaque

== History ==
The hotel was founded in 1917 by Anglo-American brothers Charles Mace (combat and commercial photographer, 1889-1973), and Gordon Mace, and their families. The Inn is known especially two reasons: the hotel was named for the popular mystery novel, play and films Seven Keys to Baldpate by Earl Derr Biggers, and was eventually accepted to be the "true" Baldpate by the author. While the hotel originally gave away keys as curios, today it is known for its collection of more than 20,000 keys, usual, unusual and figurative, that have been offered to the inn by visitors, hotel guests, and dignitaries from all over the world.

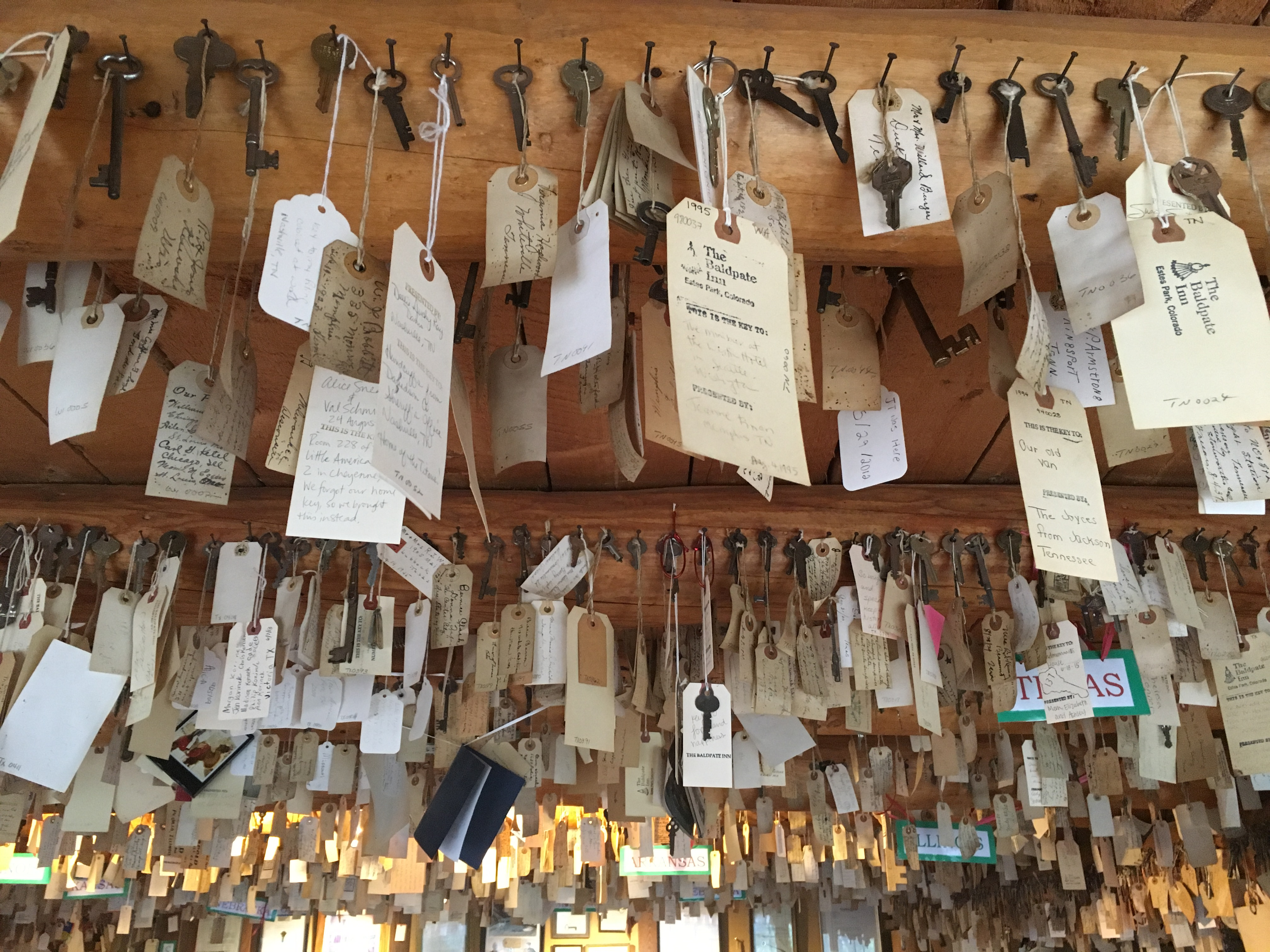
A sampling of the keys hung from the ceiling in the Key Room at the hotel

Keys are catalogued in a database, supported by a grant from American History Savers and maintained by rotating curators who offer insight into the collections through a lecture series and blog.

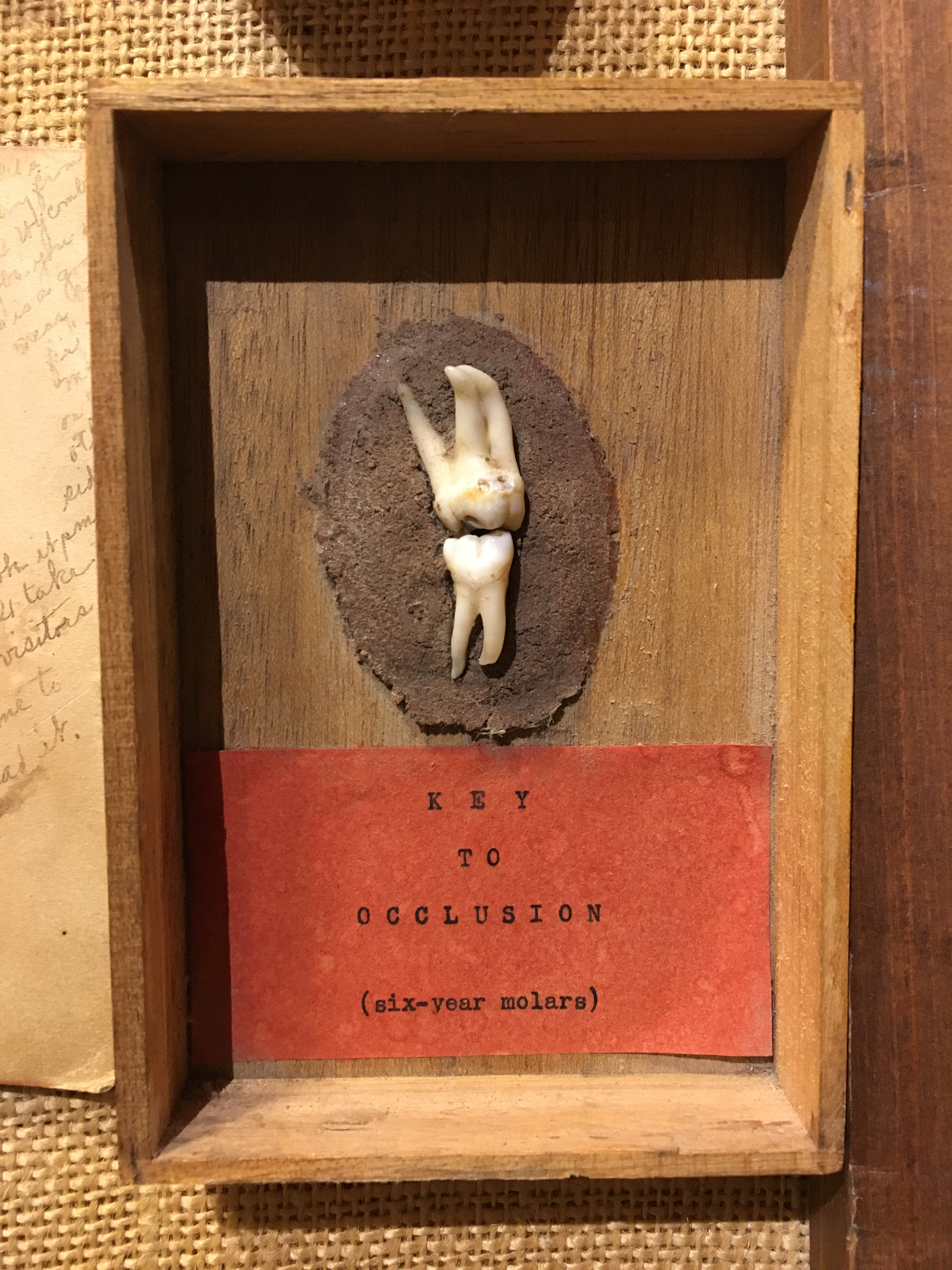
The Key to Occlusion at the hotel

The hotel structurally survived the 2013 Colorado floods, although the road leading to the property, which also connects to local trailheads, was severely damaged due to erosion. The hotel received support from the History Colorado State Historical Fund and Colorado Preservation.

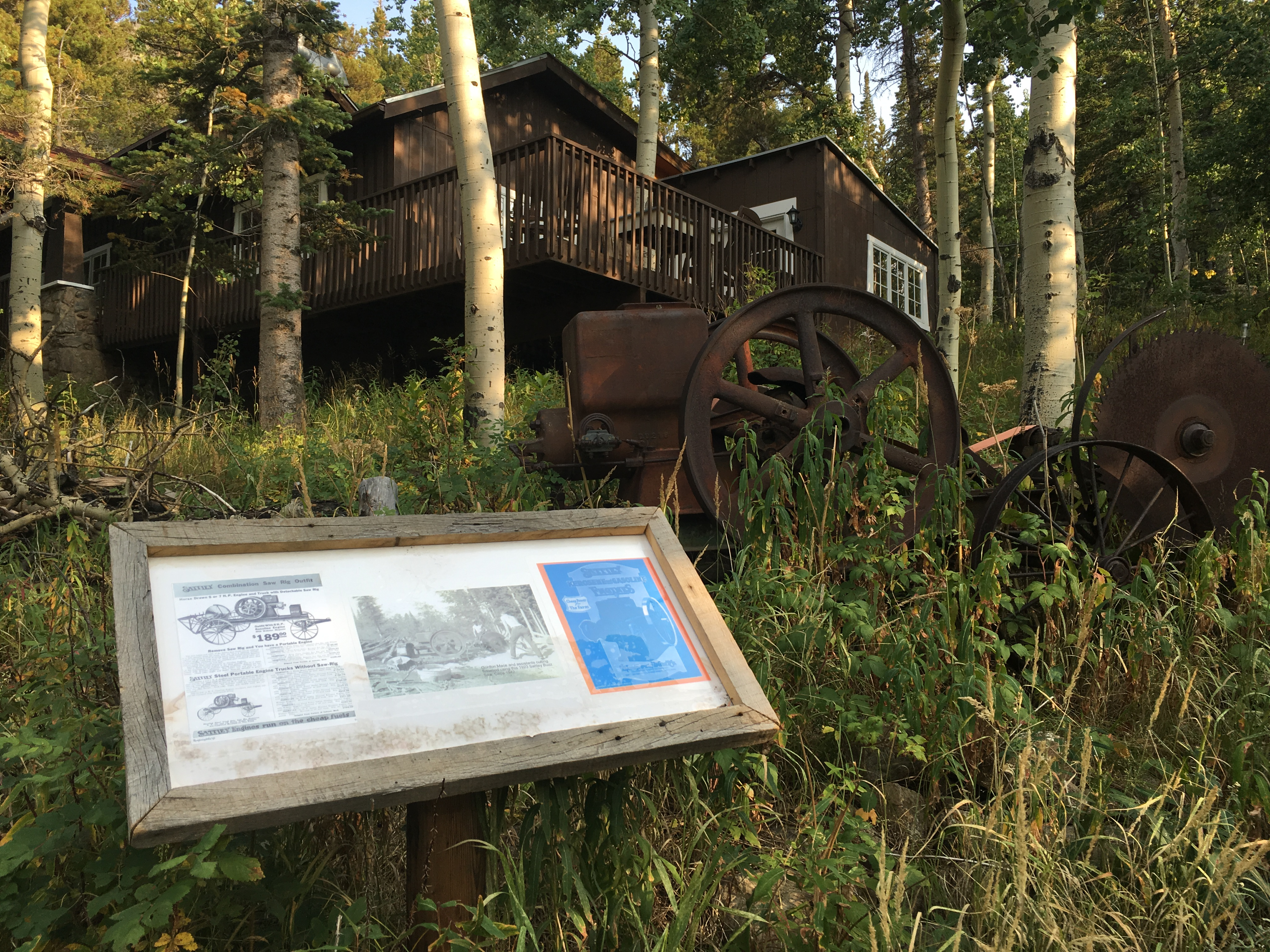
Saw mill at the hotel

== Notable Guests ==
The Seven Keys Lodge has hosted the following persons of note:

- Clarence Darrow
- Florence Hedges
- George M. Cohan
- Jean Harlow
- Jack Benny
- Lana Turner
- Roy Rogers
- Will Rogers
