= The Eleventh Commandment (1918 film) =

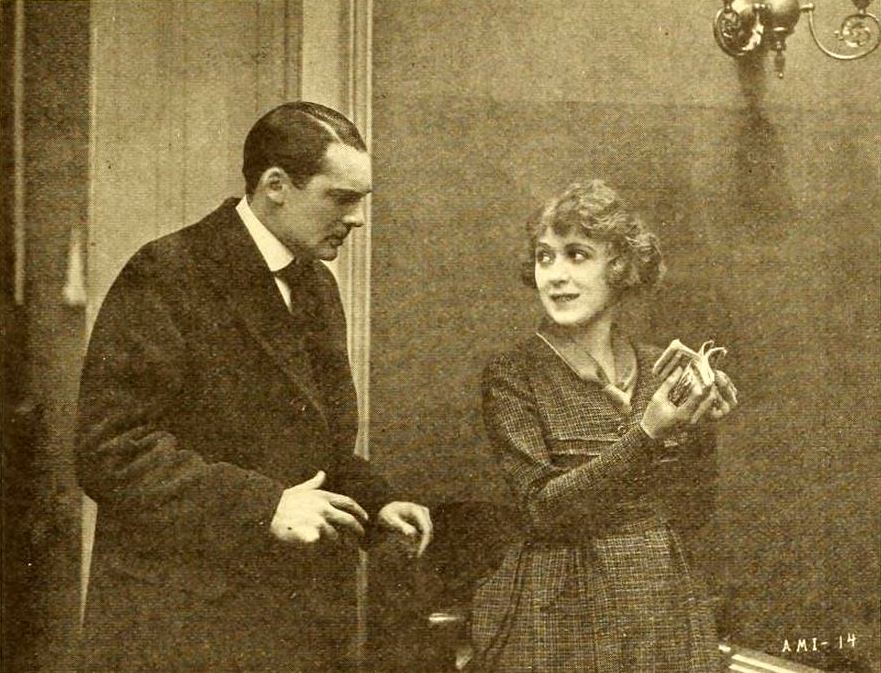
- Directed by: Ralph Ince
- Written by: Ralph Ince; Martin Justice
- Starring: Lucille Lee Stewart; Grace Reals; Carleton Macy
- Cinematography: André Barlatier
- Production company: Advanced Motion Picture Corporation
- Distributed by: Advanced Motion Picture Corporation
- Release date: June 18, 1918
- Running time: 50 minutes
- Country: United States
- Languages: Silent; English intertitles

The Eleventh Commandment is a 1918 American silent drama film directed by Ralph Ince and starring Lucille Lee Stewart, Grace Reals and Carleton Macy.

== Cast ==
- Lucille Lee Stewart as Dora Chester
- Grace Reals as Mrs. Chester
- Carleton Macy as Dr. David Mayo
- Walter Miller as Kenneth Royce
- Huntley Gordon as Robert Stanton

== Bibliography ==
- Monaco, James. The Encyclopedia of Film. Perigee Books, 1991.
