= Carleton Macy =

American stage, screen and vaudeville actor

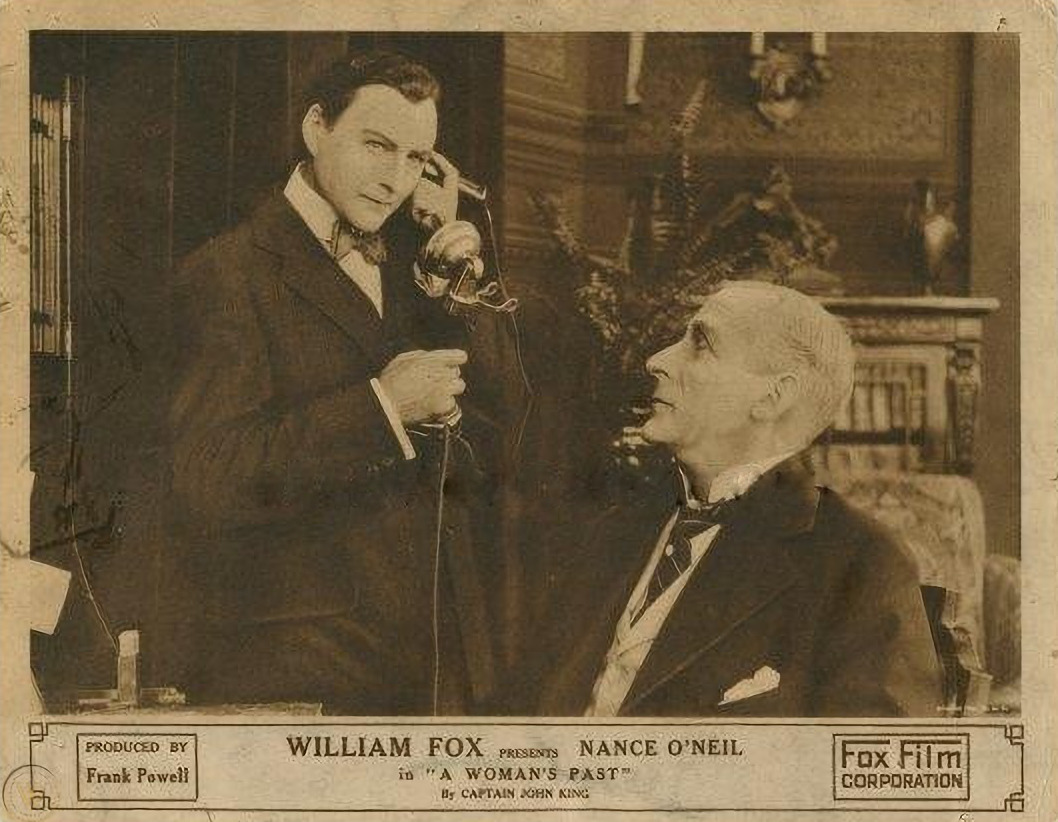
- Macy (right) in a lobby card for his film debut, A Woman's Past (1915)
- Born: 1861; New Brighton, Richmond County, New York
- Died: October 18, 1946 (aged 84–85); Bay Shore, New York Long Island
- Occupation: actor
- Years active: ?-1936
- Spouse: Maude Hall

Carleton Macy (1861–1946) was an American stage, screen and vaudeville actor. He appeared in much stage work before embarking on a film career in 1915 with William Fox. He often appeared in vaudeville with his wife, Maude Hall, in an act called "Magpie and the Jay". He later did an act with performer Al Lydell called "Two Old Cronies.

== Selected filmography ==
- A Woman's Past (1915)
- Destruction (1915)
- Gold and the Woman (1916)
- Big Jim Garrity (1916)
- The Scarlet Oath (1916)
- Seven Keys to Baldpate (1917)
- The Eleventh Commandment (1918)
- Seven Keys to Baldpate (1929)
