= Public Enemies (1941 film) =

1941 film by Albert S. Rogell

- Theatrical release poster
- Directed by: Albert S. Rogell
- Screenplay by: Edward T. Lowe Jr. Lawrence Kimble
- Story by: Michael Burke
- Produced by: Robert North
- Starring: Wendy Barrie; Phillip Terry; Edgar Kennedy; William Frawley; Marc Lawrence; Nana Bryant
- Cinematography: Ernest Miller
- Edited by: Edward Mann
- Music by: Mort Glickman
- Production company: Republic Pictures
- Distributed by: Republic Pictures
- Release date: October 30, 1941
- Running time: 68 minutes
- Country: United States
- Language: English

Public Enemies is a 1941 American comedy film directed by Albert S. Rogell and written by Edward T. Lowe Jr. and Lawrence Kimble. The film stars Wendy Barrie, Phillip Terry, Edgar Kennedy, William Frawley, Marc Lawrence and Nana Bryant. The film was released on October 30, 1941, by Republic Pictures.

== Plot ==
An ex-reporter and the socialite who caused him to lose his job become embroiled in a crime organisation's operations.

== Cast ==
- Wendy Barrie as Bonnie Parker
- Phillip Terry as Bill Raymond
- Edgar Kennedy as Biff
- William Frawley as Bang
- Marc Lawrence as Mike
- Nana Bryant as Emma
- Willie Fung as Lee Hong
- Paul Fix as Scat
- Russell Hicks as Tregar
- Tim Ryan as Trumbull
- Duke York as Holmes
- Ken Lundy as Lively
- Peter Leeds as Reporter
- Cyril Ring as Reporter
- Eddie Fetherston as Reporter
- Francis Sayles as Copy Man
- Guy Usher as Detective Captain
- Lee Phelps as Sergeant Operator
- Charles McAvoy as Policeman
- Rod Bacon as Tubby
- Pat Gleason as Maxie
- Dick Paxton as Bellboy
- Chuck Morrison as Deliveryman
- Jack Kenney as Deliveryman
- Harry Holman as Fat Reporter
- Frank Richards as Shelby
- Sammy Stein as Jake
- Francis Pierlot as Priest
- Jerry Jerome as Duke
- Wally Albright as Tommy
- Sam Bernard as Karmourian
- Sammy McKim as Newsboy
- Robert Winkler as Newsboy
- Douglas Deems as Newsboy
- Larry Harris as Newsboy
- Eddy Waller as Olaf
- James C. Morton as Detective
- Dick Rush as Detective
- Arthur Housman as Drunk
