= House of the Long Shadows =

1983 British film by Pete Walker

House of Long Shadows
- UK quad poster for House of Long Shadows
- Directed by: Pete Walker
- Screenplay by: Michael Armstrong
- Based on: Seven Keys to Baldpate by Earl Derr Biggers
- Produced by: Menahem Golan; Yoram Globus
- Starring: Vincent Price; Christopher Lee; Peter Cushing; John Carradine; Sheila Keith; Julie Peasgood; Richard Todd; Desi Arnaz, Jr.
- Cinematography: Norman Langley
- Edited by: Robert Dearberg
- Music by: Richard Harvey
- Production company: London-Cannon Films
- Distributed by: Cannon Film Distributors
- Release date: 17 June 1983 (United Kingdom)
- Running time: 101 minutes
- Country: United Kingdom
- Language: English
- Budget: $7.5 million

House of the Long Shadows is a 1983 British horror film directed by Pete Walker. It is notable for featuring four iconic horror film stars (Vincent Price, Christopher Lee, Peter Cushing and John Carradine) together for the first and only time. The screenplay by Michael Armstrong is based on the 1913 novel Seven Keys to Baldpate by Earl Derr Biggers, which was also adapted into a famous play that gave birth in turn to several films.

== Plot ==
Kenneth Magee, a young writer, bets his publisher $20,000 that he can write a novel of the calibre of Wuthering Heights in 24 hours. To get in the mood for the undertaking, he goes to a deserted Welsh manor. Upon his arrival, however, Magee discovers that Bllyddpaetwr Manor is not as empty as he was told. Still there are Lord Elijah Grisbane and his daughter, Victoria, who have been maintaining the mansion on their own. As the stormy night progresses, more people come to the mansion, including Lord Grisbane's sons Lionel and Sebastian, Magee's publisher's secretary, Mary Norton, and Corrigan, a potential buyer of the property.

After much coaxing, the Grisbanes reveal that they are here to release their brother, Roderick, who was imprisoned in his room for 40 years because he seduced a village girl when he was 14 and killed her when he found out she was pregnant. When they go to release him, they find the room empty and conclude that he broke out recently by breaking the bars in front of the window. Moments later, Lord Grisbane has a fatal heart attack. As Magee talks about getting the police, screams are heard and they find Victoria strangled to death. When Corrigan, Magee, and Mary decide to leave, they discover all of their cars have slashed tyres. Soon, Diana and Andrew Caulder, a young couple who Magee met at the railway station, arrive seeking shelter from the storm. They are soon killed when Diana washes her face with water that has been replaced by acid and Andrew drinks poisoned punch. The remaining five decide to find Roderick and kill him before he kills them.

Magee, Sebastian, and Mary search a series of tunnels behind a bookcase. During their search, they get separated and Sebastian is hanged to death from the ceiling. Mary makes it back to Corrigan and Lionel while Magee remains lost in the tunnels. Corrigan soon reveals that he, in fact, is Roderick and that he escaped his prison decades ago, but returns every now and then to make them think he was still trapped. He then proceeds to kill Lionel — who really killed the girl all those years ago and framed him — with a battle axe and chase Mary throughout the manor. Magee soon finds them and, after the ensuing fight, knocks Roderick down the stairs; during the fall, Roderick accidentally stabs himself with the axe. As Roderick is dying, his victims suddenly walk into the room, very much alive; it is revealed that all was a joke put on by Magee's publisher; even Roderick rises, his wound also a fake.

It is then revealed that everything was part of Magee's imagination while writing the story, as he finishes his novel in the morning and returns to give it to his publisher. When his publisher gives him his $20,000 he proceeds to rip it up, as he has learned that some things are more important than money. Magee then meets Mary Jameson who looks exactly like the Mary Norton of his imaginary scenario. This is because she is his publisher's real secretary whom he had run into at the start of the piece and found attractive. Intrigued and after talking for a short while he asks her if she believes in love at first sight. She replies, 'why not?" As the couple walk out of the publisher's office and pass through the club bar down the hall, Magee notices that the waiter looks exactly like Lionel Grisbane, perhaps another subconscious transplant. Startled, he quickly hides his surprise and asks Mary to walk faster and get out of the place as quickly as they can.

== Cast ==
- Vincent Price as Lionel Grisbane
- Christopher Lee as Mr. Corrigan/Roderick Grisbane
- Peter Cushing as Sebastian Grisbane
- Desi Arnaz, Jr. as Kenneth Magee
- John Carradine as Lord Elijah Grisbane
- Sheila Keith as Victoria Grisbane
- Julie Peasgood as Mary Norton
- Richard Todd as Sam Allyson
- Louise English as Diana Caulder
- Richard Hunter as Andrew Caulder
- Norman Rossington as Station Master

== Production ==
The film was shot at Rotherfield Park, a manor house in rural Hampshire, England.

== Release ==
House of the Long Shadows was released on June 17, 1983.

== Critical response ==
In a contemporary review, Kim Newman (Monthly Film Bulletin) states that the main selling point of the film is the return of these particular horror actors, which in turn becomes a "major surprise, and disappointment, in that the film should waste these Grand Old Icons on an entirely superfluous remake of Seven Keys to Baldpate". The review states that, along with the producers' film The Wicked Lady, their work is long out of date, that in the "preposterous twist ending", "Armstrong and Walker display an appalling contempt for the audience", and that the ending turns "a disappointing project into an infuriating one."

In a review of the Blu-ray release, Chris Coffel of Bloody Disgusting compared it to a Hammer horror film and said "It’s not the best movie for any of the four stars involved. But it may very well be the best tribute ever made to the golden age of horror and that makes it something very, very special."
