= Pan-Americana =

1945 film directed by John H. Auer

- Film poster
- Directed by: John H. Auer; Ruby Rosenberg (assistant)
- Screenplay by: Lawrence Kimble
- Story by: Frederick Kohner; John H. Auer
- Produced by: John H. Auer
- Starring: Phillip Terry; Audrey Long; Robert Benchley; Eve Arden; Ernest Truex; Marc Cramer; Jane Greer (uncredited)
- Cinematography: Frank Redman
- Edited by: Harry Marker
- Music by: Leigh Harline; Constantin Bakaleinikoff
- Production company: RKO Radio Pictures
- Release date: March 22, 1945 (US)
- Running time: 84 minutes
- Country: United States
- Language: English

Pan-Americana is a 1945 American romantic comedy film produced and directed by John H. Auer, from a screenplay by Lawrence Kimble, based on a story by Auer and Frederick Kohner. RKO released the film on March 22, 1945, and the picture stars Phillip Terry, Audrey Long, Robert Benchley, Eve Arden, Ernest Truex, Marc Cramer, and Jane Greer (uncredited) in her feature film debut. The film was an example of the Good Neighbor policy encouraging Americans to travel to South America for holidays and the last of a film genre.

== Plot ==
American journalist Jo Anne Benson travels with photographer Dan Jordan to a trip to Mexico, Cuba and Brazil for a magazine story encountering a variety of South American entertainers.

== Cast ==
- Phillip Terry as Dan Jordan
- Audrey Long as Jo Anne Benson
- Robert Benchley as Charlie Corker
- Eve Arden as Helen 'Hoppy' Hopkins
- Ernest Truex as Uncle Rudy
- Marc Cramer as Gerold 'Jerry' Bruce
- Lita Baron as Lupita (as Isabelita)
- Rosario and Antoni
- Miguelito Valdés
- Harold Liebman and Lola Liebman]
- Louise Burnette
- Chinita
- Chuy Castillion
- Chuy Reyes and His Orchestra
- Nestor Amaral and His Samba Band
- Rita Corday as Pan-American Girl
- Jane Greer as Miss Downing
- Julian Rivero as Pablo the Driver-Tour Guide

== Soundtrack ==
- Rumba Matumba
  Music by Bobby Collazo
  Lyrics by Mort Greene
- Guadalajara
  Written by Pepe Guízar
- Babalú
  Written by Margarita Lecuona
- Negra Leono
  Written by Antonio Fernandez
- La morena de mi copla
  Written by Carlos Castellanos Gómez
- Stars in Your Eyes
  Music by Gabriel Ruiz
  Lyrics by Ricardo López Méndez
  English Lyrics by Mort Greene
- No Tabuleiro da Baiana
  Written by Ary Barroso
  English Lyrics by Mort Greene
