= Music in Manhattan =

1944 film

- Film poster
- Directed by: John H. Auer
- Screenplay by: Lawrence Kimble
- Story by: Harold Jacob Smith; Jack Scholl; Maurice Tombragel
- Produced by: John H. Auer
- Starring: Anne Shirley
- Cinematography: Russell Metty
- Edited by: Harry Marker
- Music by: Leigh Harline
- Distributed by: RKO Radio Pictures
- Release date: October 6, 1944
- Running time: 81 minutes
- Country: United States
- Language: English

Music in Manhattan is a 1944 American musical film directed by John H. Auer. The film was nominated for an Academy Award for Best Sound Recording (Stephen Dunn).

== Plot ==
Frankie Foster and Stanley Benson are a pair of small-potatoes performers. Both try to make it to the big-time after winning an amateur talent contest. Though this leads them to a few professional gigs, something is missing from their act and they are not popular. Believing a little cash will boost their career, Frankie heads for Washington, D.C. to see if her wealthy father will help them. En route Frankie is mistaken for the wife of the well-known pilot Johnny Pearson and ends up in his suite having to pretend she is his spouse. When the pilot meets her, romantic sparks fly.

== Cast ==
- Anne Shirley as Frankie Foster
- Dennis Day as Stanley Benson
- Phillip Terry as Johnny Pearson
- Raymond Walburn as Professor Carl Roberti
- Jane Darwell as Mrs. Pearson
