= The Dark Horse (1946 film) =

1946 drama film

- Theatrical release poster
- Directed by: Will Jason
- Screenplay by: Charles R. Marion; Leo Solomon
- Based on: Running for Rooney by Sam Hellman
- Produced by: Will Cowan
- Starring: Phillip Terry; Ann Savage; Allen Jenkins; Jane Darwell; Donald MacBride; Edward Gargan
- Cinematography: Paul Ivano
- Edited by: Paul Landres
- Production company: Universal Pictures
- Distributed by: Universal Pictures
- Release date: July 19, 1946
- Running time: 59 minutes
- Country: United States
- Language: English

The Dark Horse is a 1946 American drama film directed by Will Jason and written by Charles R. Marion and Leo Solomon. The film stars Phillip Terry, Ann Savage, Allen Jenkins, Jane Darwell, Donald MacBride and Edward Gargan. The film was released on July 19, 1946, by Universal Pictures.

== Cast ==
- Phillip Terry as George Willoughby Kelly
- Ann Savage as Mary Burton
- Allen Jenkins as Willis Trimble
- Jane Darwell as Aunt Hattie
- Donald MacBride as John Rooney
- Edward Gargan as Eustace Kelly
- Raymond Largay as Mr. Aldrich
- Ruth Lee as Mrs. Aldrich
- Henri DeSoto as Maitre d' Hotel
- Si Jenks as Old Man
