= Seven Keys to Baldpate (1925 film) =

1925 film by Fred C. Newmeyer

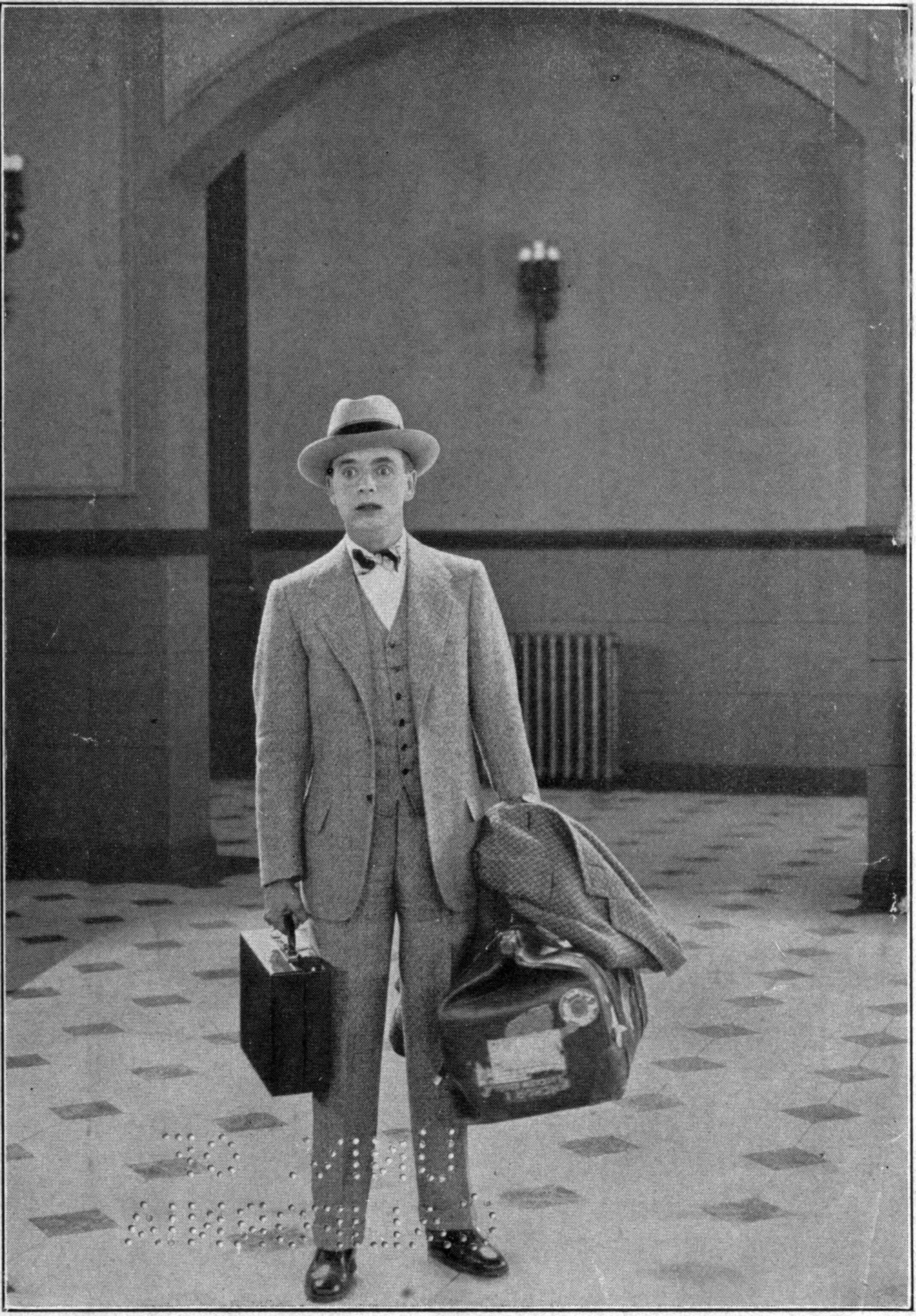
- Producer-star Douglas MacLean in Seven Keys to Baldpate
- Directed by: Fred C. Newmeyer
- Written by: Wade Boteler (scenario); Frank Griffin (scenario)
- Based on: Seven Keys to Baldpate by Earl Derr Biggers (1913 novel) and George M. Cohan (1913 play)
- Produced by: Adolph Zukor; Jesse Lasky; Douglas MacLean
- Starring: Douglas MacLean
- Cinematography: Jack MacKenzie
- Distributed by: Paramount Pictures
- Release date: October 19, 1925
- Running time: 66 minutes; 7 reels (6,648 feet)
- Country: United States
- Language: Silent (English intertitles)

Seven Keys to Baldpate is a lost 1925 American silent comedy mystery film based on the 1913 mystery novel by Earl Derr Biggers and 1913 play by George M. Cohan. Previously made in Australia in 1916 and by Paramount in 1917, this version was produced by, and starred, Douglas MacLean and was directed by Fred C. Newmeyer (who later directed Our Gang shorts). Out of seven film adaptations of the story made between 1916 and 1983, this version is the only one that is now considered lost. The story was remade again later in 1929, 1935, 1946 (TV movie), and 1947. It was also remade in 1983 under the title House of the Long Shadows, featuring John Carradine, Peter Cushing, Vincent Price, and Christopher Lee.

== Plot ==
As described in a film magazine review:

William Magee, author, returns from Europe and declares that, instead of writing while he was there, he was buying presents for Mary Norton, daughter of his publisher, to whom he is engaged. Norton, who faces ruin if William does not produce another novel on short order, forbids his daughter’s marriage until the book is written. William agrees to write, and Bentley offers him the use of Baldpate Inn, a summer resort closed for the season and therefore quiet. The caretakers tell William that the key they give him is the only one in existence that will open the inn. However, while he is writing, Bland unlocks the door, enters, and hides a large sum of money in the inn safe. Then in rapid succession the members of a gang of crooks looking for the money enter. William, thinking that the people are in a conspiracy to interrupt him, ignores the warning of Mary that he is in danger. The sheriff arrives to arrest all present at the inn, but William eludes him. The caretakers return and William tells them he has finished the book. Only then is it learned that all of the action is really in the book, and has not happened in reality. Mary arrives and is told by William that the novel is finished and they are to be married the next day.

== Cast ==
- Douglas MacLean as William Magee
- Edith Roberts as Mary Norton
- Anders Randolf as J. K. Norton
- Crauford Kent as Bentley
- Ned Sparks as Bland
- William Orlamond as The Hermit
- Wade Boteler as Cargan
- Eddie Sturgis as Lou Max
- Betty Francisco as Myra Thornhill
- Mayme Kelso as Mrs. Rhodes
- Fred Kelsey as Sheriff
- Fred Lockney as Quimby
- Edith Yorke as Mrs. Quimby

== Critical reception ==
In The New York Times, Mordaunt Hall wrote, "Douglas MacLean, who relies a great deal upon his eyes and his teeth in acting, is only moderately amusing in the film conception of Seven Keys to Baldpate, which is at the Rivoli this week. This does not seem to be as good a vehicle for him as The Yankee Consul and other productions in which he has figured. There are long stretches without much in the way of genuine fun, and Mr. MacLean is rather stiff and his clothes are much too well pressed. He looks as if he had come to life from a man's fashion advertisement, without a characterizing crease."

Critic Troy Howarth comments "The emphasis... is as much on comedy as it is on chills and suspense, and it seems likely that most viewers were familiar with the story's convoluted plot by this time".
