= Seven Keys to Baldpate (1935 film) =

1935 film by Edward Killy

- Directed by: William Hamilton; Edward Killy; Charles Kerr (assistant)
- Written by: Anthony Veiller; Wallace Smith
- Based on: Seven Keys to Baldpate by Earl Derr Biggers (1913 novel) and George M. Cohan (1913 play)
- Produced by: William Sistrom (associate producer)
- Starring: Gene Raymond; Eric Blore
- Cinematography: Robert De Grasse (as Robert de Grasse)
- Edited by: Desmond Marquette
- Music by: Alberto Colombo (uncredited)
- Distributed by: RKO
- Release date: 13 December 1935 (US)
- Running time: 68 minutes
- Country: United States
- Language: English

Seven Keys to Baldpate is a 1935 American comedy mystery film directed by William Hamilton and Edward Killy and starring Gene Raymond and Eric Blore. It is one of several filmed versions based on the popular 1913 play.

== Plot ==
A writer, looking for some peace and quiet in order to finish a novel, takes a room at the Baldpate Inn. However, peace and quiet are the last things he gets, as there are some very strange goings-on at the establishment.

== Cast ==
- Gene Raymond as Magee
- Margaret Callahan as Mary Norton, alias of Mary Johnson
- Eric Blore as Professor Bolton, alias of Harrison
- Grant Mitchell as Thomas Hayden
- Moroni Olsen as Jim Cargan
- Erin O'Brien-Moore as Mrs. Hayden, alias of Myra
- Henry Travers as Adlebert Peters
- Walter Brennan as Station agent
- Ray Mayer as Bland
- Erville Alderson as Chief of police
- Murray Alper as Max
- Harry Beresford as Lige Quimby
- Emma Dunn as Mrs. Quimby

== Reception ==
The critic from The Washington Post said he could think of no two actors less alike than Gene Raymond and Richard Dix (who starred in the 1929 film version), apart from George Arliss and Harpo Marx, and said the film was a "sturdy old warhorse"; while Variety wrote, "Too much conversation and too little action makes this mystery comedy, old stage success, only fairly amusing."
