= Seven Keys to Baldpate (1929 film) =

1929 film by Reginald Barker

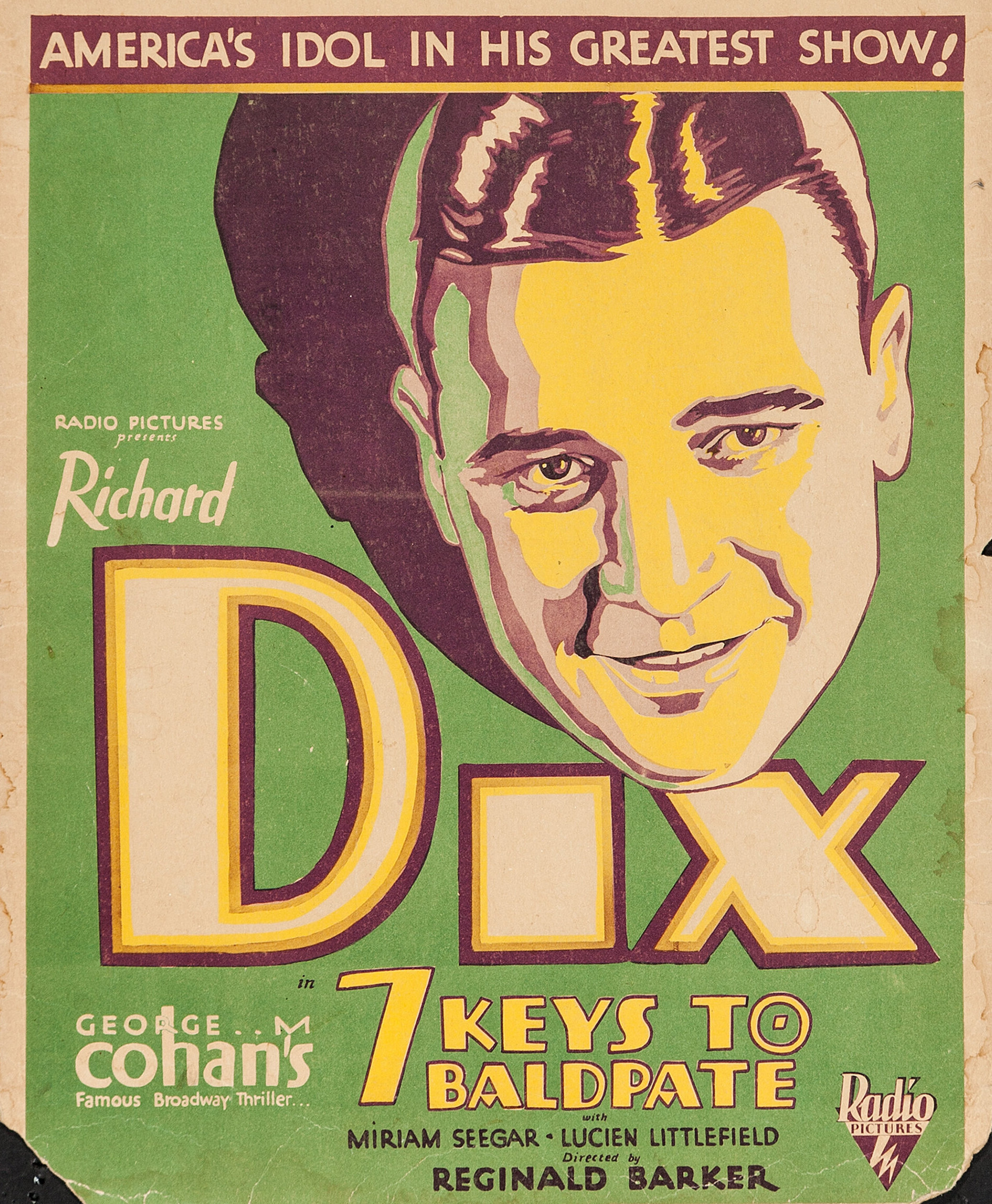
- Film poster
- Directed by: Reginald Barker
- Written by: Jane Murfin
- Based on: Seven Keys to Baldpate by Earl Derr Biggers (1913 novel) and George M. Cohan (1913 play)
- Produced by: Louis Sarecky
- Starring: Richard Dix
- Cinematography: Edward Cronjager
- Distributed by: RKO Pictures
- Release dates: December 25, 1929 (New York City); January 12, 1930 (United States)
- Running time: 72 minutes
- Country: United States
- Language: English
- Budget: $251,000
- Box office: $517,000

Seven Keys to Baldpate is a 1929 American pre-Code sound comedy mystery film produced and distributed through RKO Pictures. It was the first sound film based on the 1913 Earl Derr Biggers novel/ George M. Cohan play Seven Keys to Baldpate, following three different silent film versions (1916, 1917 and 1925). The film had its premiere on Christmas Day, 1929 in New York City, and its official release was the following month.

== Plot ==
In a New York City club, famous novelist William Halliwell "Mac" Magee makes a $5,000 bet with a wealthy friend, Hal Bentley, that he can write a 10,000-word story within 24 hours at the "lonesomest spot on Earth": a summer resort in the winter. Hal owns the resort, the Baldpate Inn, on a mountaintop 6 hours away by train.

Hal asks Mac to write something more thoughtful than his usual melodramatic thriller. If nothing else, Hal wants him to avoid the cliche of love at first sight between hero and heroine. Mac says he doesn't really believe in that, "but it makes swell fiction". Before he leaves, Hal introduces a Mrs. Rhodes and a lovely young reporter named Mary Norton—and Mac falls in love at first sight. Now he wants to delay the bet, but Hal insists he must go that night, and write the story between midnight and the following midnight.

Mac is let into the Baldpate Inn by the people with the only key: Elijah Quimby, the caretaker, and his wife. Hal has arranged for the electricity and telephone to work, and the Quimbys light fires in the fireplaces and prepare a room. They mention that the only other time someone was there in the winter it was crooked politicians who broke in so they could hide a graft payment in the office safe. They also mention a local hermit, Peters, who likes to scare people by pretending to be a ghost. The Quimbys now give Mac the key and leave. They will return the following midnight for his manuscript.

Mac locks himself in and begins work. But soon he is surprised when a man unlocks the inn and lets himself in. His name is Bland. Mac overhears him phoning someone and saying that he is going to put the money into the hotel safe and Mayor Cargan, who knows the combination, can collect it. Bland also says he has the only key to the inn. Mac confronts Bland, who pulls a gun. Eventually Mac manages to trick Bland and lock him up, but Bland escapes through a window.

Now Mary arrives, also with a key, and with Mrs. Rhodes—who is Mayor Cargan's fiancée. Mary says she is there to report on the $5,000 bet, and Mac is happy for her to stay. Mary also believes that Cargan has been accepting graft relating to a transit franchise, and would like to report on that. Peters is the next to arrive with a key, followed by the transit company owner, Cargan, and other crooked types. Mac is amused at how much the situation resembles the sort of melodrama he writes. As he has Bland's gun, he is able to control the situation for a while, but eventually the crooks get it from him, and a woman is shot dead. When the local police chief arrives, the others present Mac as the criminal.

The graft payment of $200,000, which Mrs. Norton stole, is recovered—but the police chief decides to steal it himself and flee with his family to Montreal. In a scuffle, Peters grabs the money and throws it in the fire.

At this point the ghost of the dead woman walks along an upstairs hall. Then two gunshots are heard outside. Hal arrives and lets himself in with yet another key. He says policemen tried to keep him from entering, so he shot them.

Then he says that none of the crimes have been real. He releases Mac from the bet and explains that everyone else is an actor (and Mary is actually Bland's wife): Hal was just trying to show Mac how unrealistic a melodramatic story is.

Back in Mac's room at the inn, a clock strikes midnight as he completes his story. As he looks it over, the Quimbys arrive back. Mac lets them in and hands over the manuscript. Just as planned, he has been alone for 24 hours and written the story—which is what the viewer has been seeing.

Then Hal arrives, with Mary, who is not married. Hal accepts the manuscript, and Mac resumes his romance with Mary.

== Cast ==
- Richard Dix as William Halliwell Magee
- Miriam Seegar as Mary Norton
- Margaret Livingston as Myra Thornhill
- Lucien Littlefield as Thomas Hayden
- Joseph Allen Sr. as Peters, the Hermit
- DeWitt Jennings as Mayor Jim Cargan
- Nella Walker as Mrs. Irene Rhodes
- Carleton Macy as Police Chief Kennedy (repeating his role in the 1917 silent film)
- Alan Roscoe as Bland
- Crauford Kent as Hal Bentley (repeating his role in the 1925 silent film)
- Harvey Clark as Elijah Quimby
- Edith Yorke as Mrs. Quimby (repeating her role in the 1925 silent film)

== Reception ==
In The New York Times, Mordaunt Hall wrote "...it is far more effective than it was as Douglas MacLean's silent picture of three years ago. It is one of those fanciful flights that compels one to withhold criticism until the dénouement. In fact, it is an adventure which virtually defies derogatory comments...those who did not see the play will find this audible film quite exciting, with a fair fund of merriment." while more recently, critic Leonard Maltin gave the film three out of four stars, noting, "Early talkie moves briskly through its serpentine plot; Dix was never more buoyant."

The film made a profit of $100,000. The play was filmed several times by RKO.

== See also ==
- List of early sound feature films (1926–1929)
