= Seven Keys to Baldpate (1917 film) =

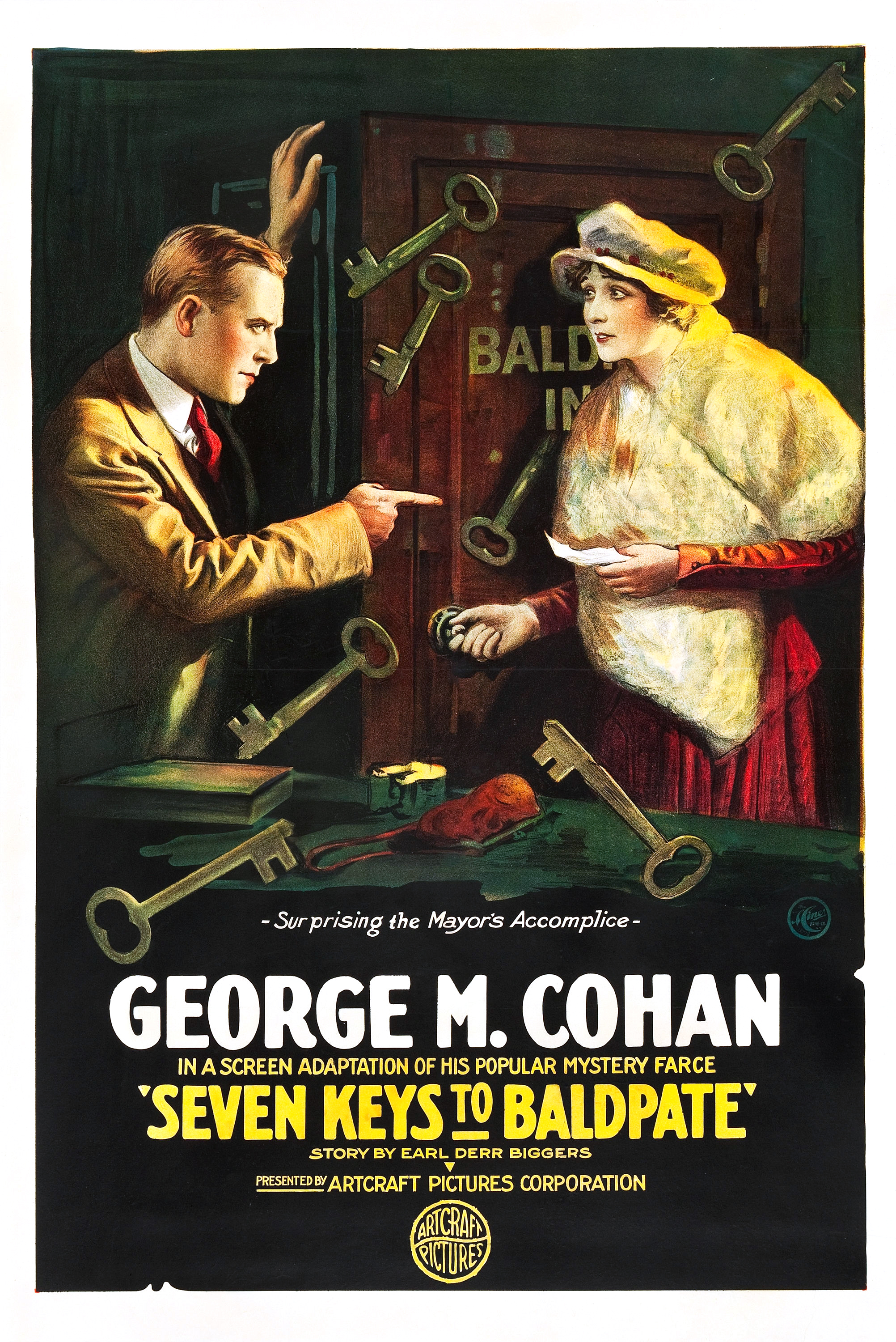
- Lobby poster with likenesses of George M. Cohan and Elda Furry
- Directed by: Hugh Ford
- Written by: Earl Derr Biggers (novel)
- Based on: Seven Keys to Baldpate; 1913 play by George M. Cohan
- Produced by: George M. Cohan
- Starring: George M. Cohan; Anna Q. Nilsson
- Cinematography: Ned Van Buren; Lewis W. Physioc
- Distributed by: Artcraft Pictures
- Release date: October 17, 1917 (United States)
- Running time: 65 minutes
- Country: United States
- Language: Silent (English intertitles)

The full film

Seven Keys to Baldpate is a 1917 American silent mystery/thriller film produced by George M. Cohan and distributed by Artcraft Pictures, an affiliate of Paramount. The film is based on Cohan's 1913 play of the 1913 novel by Earl Derr Biggers. Cohan himself stars in this silent version along with Anna Q. Nilsson and Hedda Hopper, billed under her real name Elda Furry. One version of the play preceded this movie in 1916 and numerous versions followed in the succeeding decades such as the early RKO talkie starring Richard Dix.

Seven Keys to Baldpate is an extant film with much home video availability.

== Plot ==
As described in a film magazine, George Washington Magee bets a companion $5,000 that he can write a bestseller in twenty-four hours. He goes to an isolated summer hotel in the mountains, receives the only key to the place, and sets about his task. Soon he is interrupted by complications as guests arrive, unexpected and uninvited, each with their own key to the deserted hotel. Two hundred thousand dollars gets deposited in the hotel safe, a young woman is shot, and, while the author holds the crooks at bay waiting for the police to arrive, they cook up a scheme to turn the tables on George. The woman's body disappears from the room, and the crooks are marched off to prison by U.S. Secret Service men. The caretaker returns the following night and congratulates the author on his success, and a lady reporter capitulates under the smiles of the industrious writer.

== Cast ==
- George M. Cohan as George Washington Magee
- Anna Q. Nilsson as Mary Norton
- Elda Furry as Myra Thornhill
- Corene Uzzell as Mrs. Rhodes
- Joseph W. Smiley as Mayor Cargan
- Armand Cortes as Lou Max
- Warren Cook as Thomas Hayden (credited as C. Warren Cook)
- Purnell Pratt as John Bland
- Frank Losee as Hall Bentley
- Eric Hudson as Peter the Hermit
- Carleton Macy as Police Chief Kennedy
- Paul Everton as Langdon
- Russell Bassett as Quimby
- Robert Dudley as Clerk
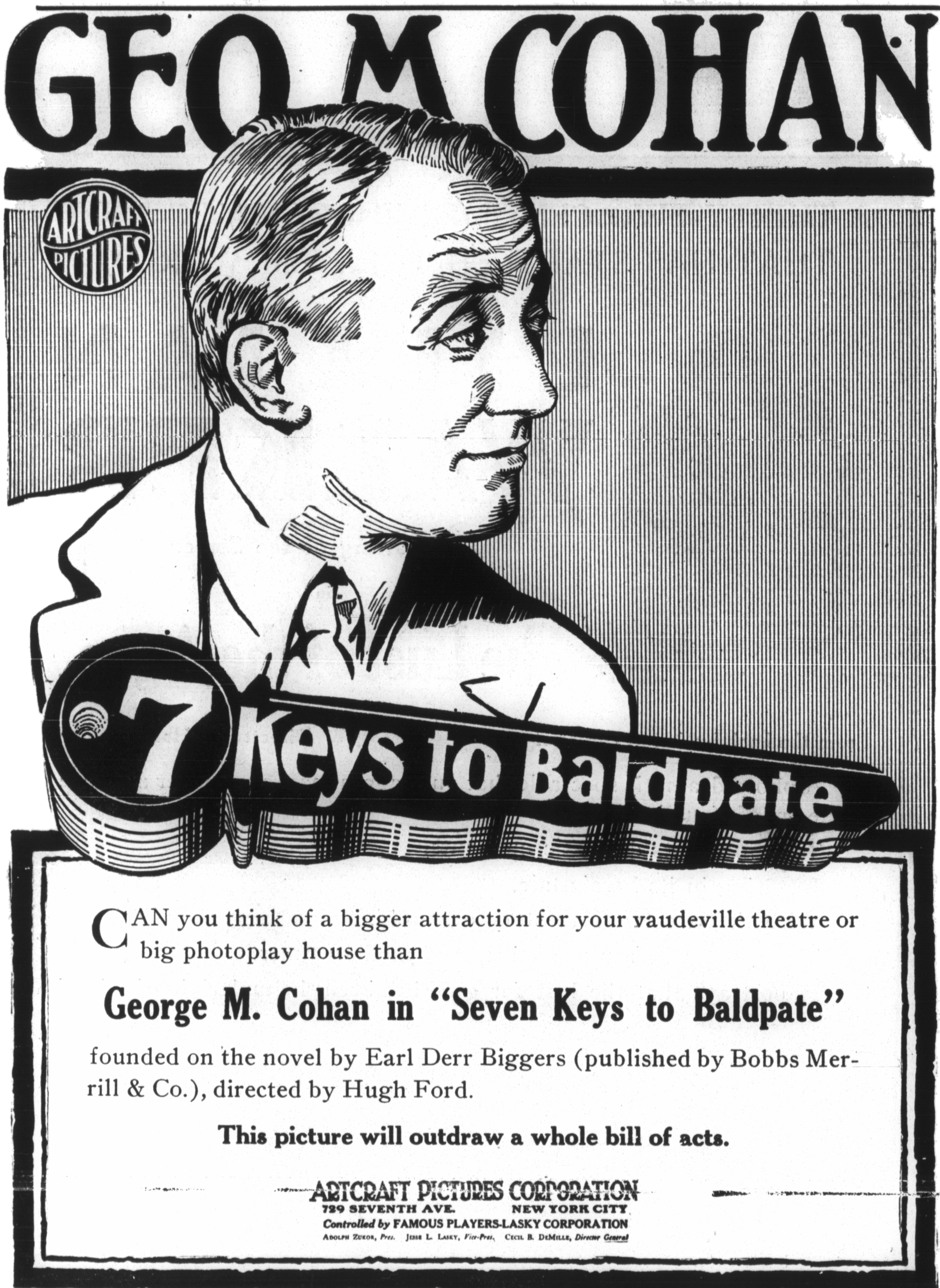
  Advertisement on p.26 of the August 24, 1917 Variety

== Critical reception ==
In Fantastic Movie Musings and Ramblings, Dave Sindelar wrote, "Cohan himself appears in the lead role. This was his first of only a handful of screen appearances, and he does a fine job...The plot is far-fetched and sometimes confusing, and the fact that some sections of the plot are replaced by title cards doesn’t help, but I like the backstory, and there’s definitely an air of parody to the proceedings. At this point of time, I’d have to say it’s my favorite version of the story."

== See also ==
- The House That Shadows Built (1931 promotional film by Paramount; a possibility that the unnamed Cohan clip is from Seven Keys to Baldpate)
