= Phillip Terry =

American actor

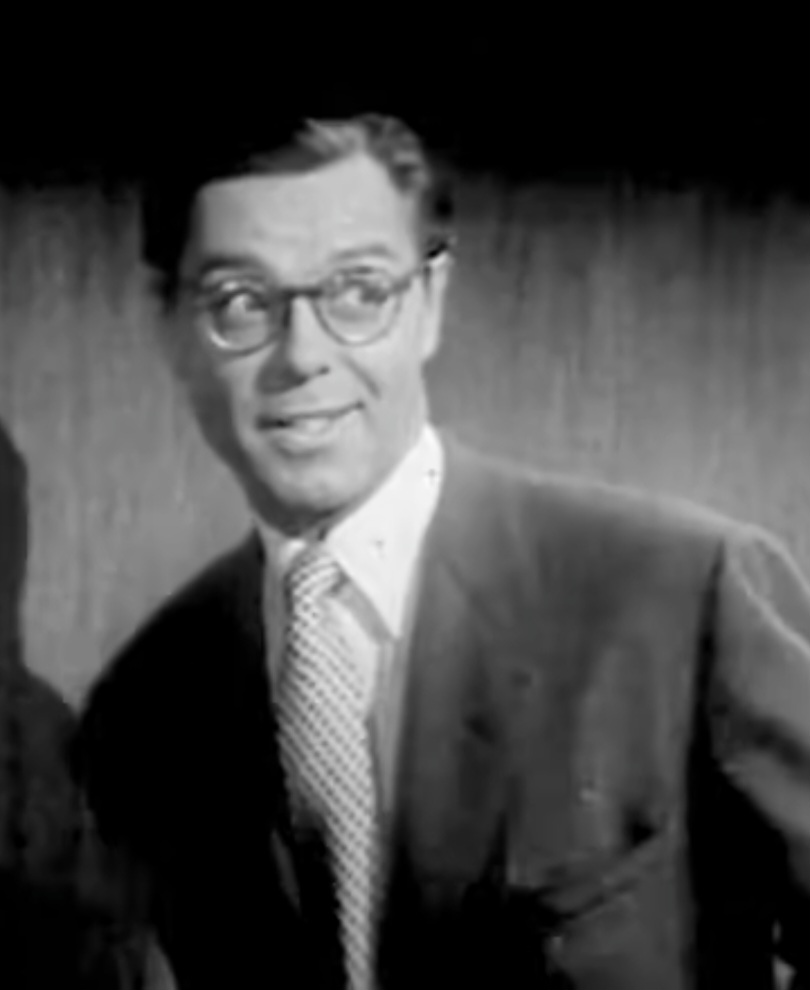
- Terry in Double Exposure (1944)
- Born: Frederick Henry Kormann; March 7, 1909; San Francisco, California, U.S.
- Died: February 23, 1993 (aged 83); Santa Barbara, California, U.S.
- Occupation: Actor
- Years active: 1937–1974
- Spouses: Joan Crawford (m. 1942; div. 1946) Helen Murphy (m. 1949; div. 1954) Rosalind Lee (m. 1973)

Phillip Terry (born Frederick Henry Kormann; March 7, 1909 – February 23, 1993) was an American actor.

== Early years ==
Terry was born Frederick Henry Kormann on March 7, 1909 in San Francisco, California to Frederick Andrew Kormann and his wife, Ida Ruth (Voll). He "had elementary education in various schools in the oil country around Texas and Oklahoma." He attended Iona High School in New York and Sacred Heart College in San Francisco.

== Career ==
After studying at the Royal Academy, he toured British provinces for four years performing in stock theater. He went to Hollywood and took a job with CBS Radio, where he performed in a number of plays on the air, specializing in Shakespearean roles. In 1937, a Metro-Goldwyn-Mayer talent scout heard him in one of these broadcasts and arranged an interview. Terry made a screen test and was awarded a contract with the studio. One of his first film appearances was in a bit part in the movie Mannequin (1937) starring Joan Crawford.

Two years later he signed with Paramount, where he starred in The Parson of Panamint, The Monster and the Girl in 1941. He then did supporting roles in Wake Island (1942) and Bataan (1943), the work on the latter occurring when he was on "loan-out" to MGM. During World War II Terry was classified "4F" unfit for military service due to defective vision. When he left Paramount, he signed with RKO and was in Music in Manhattan, George White's Scandals, Pan-Americana, Born to Kill and the lead in Seven Keys to Baldpate (1947). Terry appeared in more than eighty movies over the span of his career. Many of the early roles were small and often uncredited. But in the 1940s, he received bigger and more numerous roles in some quality movies, such as The Lost Weekend (1945) starring Ray Milland, and To Each His Own (1946) starring Olivia de Havilland, who won an Oscar as Best Actress for her performance in the film.

== Marriages ==
On July 21, 1942, at the Hidden Valley Ranch in Ventura County, California, he married film star Joan Crawford. They were divorced in 1946. Irving Wallace, Amy Wallace, David Wallechinsky, and Sylvia Wallace wrote in their book, The Intimate Sex Lives of Famous People:

Despite her status as a single parent, in 1939 she [Crawford] began adoption proceedings for a baby girl, whom she named Joan Crawford, Jr. Months later, Joan changed the child's name to Christina...During [her marriage to Phillip Terry] she adopted a second child — a boy — and named him Phillip Terry, Jr. Following her 1946 divorce from Terry, she renamed the boy Christopher Crawford.

== Later years ==
Terry never completely abandoned acting. During the 1950s, 1960s and early 1970s, he took on occasional movie roles. Some of his better B movies from this period include The Leech Woman (1960), with Grant Williams, and The Navy vs. the Night Monsters (1966), with Mamie Van Doren. Sometimes he would accept television roles and was in episodes of The Name of the Game and Police Woman. He also made five guest appearances on Perry Mason, including the role of murder victim Robert Doniger in the 1960 episode, "The Case of the Gallant Grafter", and he played murderer Lawrence Kent in the 1961 episode, "The Case of the Resolute Reformer".

== Filmography ==
| Year | Title | Role | Notes |
|---|---|---|---|
| 1937 | The Last Gangster | Reporter | Uncredited |
| 1937 | Navy Blue and Gold | Kelly | |
| 1937 | You're Only Young Once | Pilot | Uncredited |
| 1937 | Mannequin | Man Outside Stage Door | Uncredited |
| 1937 | Rosalie | West Point Cadet | Uncredited |
| 1938 | Love Is a Headache | Club 44 Radio Man | Uncredited |
| 1938 | Of Human Hearts | Army Intern | Uncredited |
| 1938 | Test Pilot | Photographer | Uncredited |
| 1938 | Hold That Kiss | Ted Evans | |
| 1938 | Yellow Jack | Ferguson | |
| 1938 | Three Comrades | Young Soldier | Uncredited |
| 1938 | Marie Antoinette | Man in Gaming House | Uncredited |
| 1938 | Boys Town | Newspaper Reporter | Uncredited |
| 1938 | Too Hot to Handle | San Francisco Airport Official | Uncredited |
| 1938 | Vacation from Love | Band Leader | Uncredited |
| 1938 | Young Dr. Kildare | Dr. Vickery | Uncredited |
| 1938 | The Great Waltz | Student | Uncredited |
| 1938 | Spring Madness | Dartmouth College Student | Uncredited |
| 1938 | Four Girls in White | Dr. Sidney | |
| 1939 | Honolulu | Nightclub Bandleader | Uncredited |
| 1939 | Calling Dr. Kildare | Bates | |
| 1939 | Tell No Tales | Man on Stage | Uncredited |
| 1939 | It's a Wonderful World | Chauffeur | Uncredited |
| 1939 | On Borrowed Time | Bill Lowry | |
| 1939 | Miracles for Sale | Magic Show Master of Ceremonies | Uncredited |
| 1939 | Fast and Furious | Master of Ceremonies | Uncredited |
| 1939 | Balalaika | Lt. Smirnoff | |
| 1940 | Those Were the Days! | Ransom | |
| 1940 | Junior G-Men | Jim Bradford | Serial |
| 1940 | Fugitive from a Prison Camp | Bill Harding | |
| 1940 | North West Mounted Police | Constable Judson | Uncredited |
| 1940 | Dancing on a Dime | Brent Martin | |
| 1941 | The Monster and the Girl | Scot Webster | |
| 1941 | I Wanted Wings | Radio Operator | Uncredited |
| 1941 | The Parson of Panamint | Reverend Philip Pharo | |
| 1941 | Public Enemies | Bill Raymond | |
| 1942 | Torpedo Boat | Tommy Whelan | |
| 1942 | Are Husbands Necessary? | Cory Cortwright | |
| 1942 | Sweater Girl | Prof. Martin Lawrence | |
| 1942 | Wake Island | Pvt. 'Cookie' Warren | Uncredited |
| 1943 | Bataan | Matthew Hardy | |
| 1944 | Ladies Courageous | Tommy Harper | |
| 1944 | Music in Manhattan | Johnny Pearson | |
| 1944 | Double Exposure | Ben Scribner | |
| 1945 | Pan-Americana | Dan Jordan | |
| 1945 | The Lost Weekend | Wick Birnam | |
| 1945 | George White's Scandals | Tom McGrath | |
| 1946 | To Each His Own | Alex Piersen | |
| 1946 | The Dark Horse | George Kelly | |
| 1947 | Beat the Band | Damon Dillingham | |
| 1947 | Born to Kill | Fred | |
| 1947 | Seven Keys to Baldpate | Kenneth Magee | |
| 1952 | Deadline – U.S.A. | Lewis Schaefer | Uncredited |
| 1958 | Man from God's Country | Sheriff | |
| 1958 | Money, Women and Guns | Damian Bard | |
| 1960 | The Leech Woman | Dr. Paul Talbot | |
| 1961 | The Explosive Generation | Mr. Carlyle | |
| 1966 | The Navy vs. the Night Monsters | Base Doctor | |
| 1972 | Class of '74 | Dave | |
