= Seven Keys to Baldpate (1947 film) =

1947 film by Lew Landers

- Directed by: Lew Landers
- Screenplay by: Lee Loeb
- Based on: Seven Keys to Baldpate by Earl Derr Biggers (1913 novel) and George M. Cohan (1913 play)
- Produced by: Herman Schlom
- Starring: Phillip Terry; Jacqueline White; Eduardo Ciannelli
- Cinematography: Jack MacKenzie
- Edited by: J.R. Whittredge
- Music by: Paul Sawtell; C. Bakaleinikoff (musical director)
- Production company: RKO Radio Pictures
- Distributed by: RKO Radio Pictures
- Release date: July 30, 1947
- Running time: 64 minutes
- Country: United States
- Language: English

Seven Keys to Baldpate is a 1947 American mystery film directed by Lew Landers and starring Phillip Terry, Jacqueline White and Eduardo Ciannelli. It is the sixth film based on the popular 1913 play of the same name.

== Plot ==
While the Baldpate Inn is closed for the winter, mystery writer Kenneth Magee makes a $5,000 bet with its owner that he can spend one night there and write a story. He starts work while on the train ride, but a stranger named Mary Jordan steals the typed pages. At the station, she tries to warn him not to go to Baldpate.

Believing that he has the only key to the inn, Kenneth is surprised to find Cargan there, who says that he is the caretaker and was not expecting him. Although the inn has no electrical power, Kenneth is willing to work by an oil lamp and firelight. Mary arrives at the inn and must stay there because of the inclement weather. Kenneth again starts writing his story.

Other people also begin arriving, and all are behaving suspiciously. An old man enters through a window and explains that he is a local hermit who was curious about the lamplight in the closed inn.

Mary is the secretary of the inn's owner, and she is there to distract Kenneth in order to ensure that he does not win the bet. Kenneth learns the truth when he overhears Mary's phone call, but he mistakenly assumes that the other guests are also part of the plot. In fact, except for the hermit, they are members of a criminal gang planning to stage a false crime to file a fraudulent insurance claim.

When more of the gang arrive, they try to double-cross each other. Mary tries to call the police, but Cargan slips outside and cuts the telephone wire. She tries to tell Kenneth that the men are criminals, but he still believes that they are there to distract him until they stumble across the murdered body of a gang member. Then they try to escape but are unable to pass Cargan and his men.

The hermit summons the police, who do not entirely believe him. At the inn, the police try to determine who is telling the truth. Kenneth must stall for time as Max holds Mary at gunpoint, but he eventually leads the police to the dead body and the crooks are arrested.

However, Kenneth still wishes to win the bet. He returns to his room and starts typing his story again, with the new title of "Seven Keys to Baldpate". Mary kisses him as he types "THE END".

== Cast ==
- Phillip Terry as Kenneth Magee
- Jacqueline White as Mary Jordan
- Eduardo Ciannelli as Cargan
- Margaret Lindsay as Connie Lane
- Arthur Shields as Professor Bolton
- Jimmy Conlin as Pete, the hermit
- Tony Barrett as Max Rogers
- Jason Robards Sr. as Hayden
- Richard Powers as Steve Bland
- Erville Alderson as Station agent
- Sam McDaniel as Porter
- Harry Harvey as The chief

Jack Haley and Boris Karloff had been announced for lead roles, but they were replaced by Terry and Ciannelli.

== Production ==
Filming took place in December 1946.

Phillip Terry said: "I think classics like this can be done over and over. Almost every ten years a new audience is ready for them."

== Reception ==
Los Angeles Times film critic Philip K. Scheuer called the film "distinctively old time."

In a review for The Baltimore Sun, critic Gilbert Kanour wrote: "At this late date the plot is obviously threadbare, and the effort to combine excuses for laughter with situations expected to chill the spine and raise the hair is not very successful. ... [T]he best of acting, which this picture doesn't get, couldn't alter the verdict best expressed by turning down the thumb."

Variety wrote that the plot had "lost much of its thrill over the years. Production and direction don't give it much freshness or zip to overcome age."
